= Jerry Boys =

Record engineer

- Origin: England
- Occupations: Record producer; Audio engineer
- Years active: 1965-present
- Website: jerryboys.com

Jerry Boys is a classically trained British record producer, and engineer, noted for his works with The Beatles, Omara Portuondo, Pink Floyd, Ibrahim Ferrer, The Kronos Quartet, Everything but the Girl, The Shadows, John Lee Hooker, Richard Thompson, The Rolling Stones, Ali Farka Touré, Steeleye Span, Shakira, R.E.M, Buena Vista Social Club, Sandy Denny, Olivia Chaney, Toumani Diabaté, Shirley Collins, Yehudi Menuhin, Orchestra Baobab, Manfred Mann, Level 42, and Ry Cooder.

He started his career in 1965 at Abbey Road Studios when he was 17 years old, and is a four-time Grammy Award winner, and three-time nominee. Boys also worked at Olympic Studios, Livingston Recording Studios, EGREM and Sawmills Studios in Cornwall, England.

== Grammy Awards and nominations ==
Year awarded	Nominee/work	Award	Result
2000	Buena Vista Social Club Presents Ibrahim Ferrer	Latin Grammy Award for Best Engineered Album	Nominated
2003	Mambo Sinuendo	Grammy Award for Best Pop Instrumental Album	Won
2003	Buenos Hermanos	Grammy Award for Best Traditional Tropical Latin Album	Won
2004	Buenos Hermanos	Grammy Award for Best Tropical Latin Album	Nominated
2004	Mambo Sinuendo	Grammy Award for Best Contemporary Instrumental Album	Nominated
2005	In the Heart of the Moon	Grammy Award for Best Traditional Tropical Latin Album	Won
2010	Ali and Toumani	Grammy Award for Best Global Music Album	won

== BAFTA Awards and nominations ==
Year awarded	Nominee/work	Award	Result
2000	??	BAFTA Award for Best Sound	Nominated
