= Savane (album) =

Studio album by Ali Farka Touré
- Released: 17 July 2006 (UK); 25 July 2006 (U.S.)
- Recorded: Hôtel Mandé, Bamako, 2004
- Genre: African blues
- Length: 58:37
- Languages: local Malian and Nigerese languages
- Label: World Circuit
- Producer: Nick Gold

Ali Farka Touré chronology
In the Heart of the Moon (2005)	Savane (2006)	Ali and Toumani (2010)

Professional ratings
Aggregate scores
Source	Rating
Metacritic	94/100
Review scores
Source	Rating
The Austin Chronicle	4/5 stars
Entertainment Weekly	A+
The Guardian	5/5 stars
The Independent	4/5 stars
MusicOMH	5/5 stars
NME	8/10
The Observer	5/5 stars
Pitchfork	8.1/10
PopMatters	8/10
Stylus	A

Savane is the final solo album by Malian musician Ali Farka Touré. It is the third and final part of the Hôtel Mandé Sessions, featuring Touré and Toumani Diabaté, recorded by World Circuit head Nick Gold. The album was released posthumously by World Circuit on 17 July 2006, more than four months after Touré's death.

The recording sessions at Hôtel Mandé in Bamako took place from June to July 2004. Touré, suffering from cancer, had wanted to remain in Mali, so a temporary studio was set up on the top floor of the hotel. Touré approved the final master of Savane just weeks before his death in March 2006. He said of the album: "I know this is my best album ever. It has the most power and is the most different."

Savane features a number of non-African blues musicians, such as Little George Sueref, Pee Wee Ellis, and also Touré's protégé since the age of 13, Afel Bocoum.

It was released to high critical acclaim, earning a 94 on Metacritic. The album was also included in the book 1001 Albums You Must Hear Before You Die.

In 2009. It was awarded a gold certification from the Independent Music Companies Association which indicated sales of at least 100,000 copies throughout Europe.

== Track listing ==
1. "Erdi" – 4:42
2. "Yer Bounda Fara" – 4:18
3. "Beto" – 4:49
4. "Savane" – 7:43
5. "Soya" – 4:38
6. "Penda Yoro" – 5:25
7. "Machengoidi" – 3:35
8. "Ledi Coumbe" – 3:16
9. "Hanana" – 2:34
10. "Soko Yhinka" – 5:05
11. "Gambari Didi" – 3:49
12. "Banga" – 3:48
13. "N'Jarou" – 4:55

== Personnel ==
- Ali Farka Touré – guitar, vocals, percussion
- Mama Sissoko – ngoni
- Bassekou Kouyate – ngoni
- Dassy Sarré – ngoni
- Afel Bocoum – backing vocals (tracks 6, 7, 13)
- Alou Coulibaly – water calabash (7)
- Ramata Diakite – backing vocals (3)
- Massambou Wele Diallo – bolon (9)
- Oumar Diallo – bass (13)
- Fanga Diawara – njarka violin (1, 7, 9)
- Fain Dueñas – percussion (1, 3, 6, 9, 13)
- Pee Wee Ellis – tenor sax (1, 3, 13)
- Souleye Kané – backing vocals (2, 6, 7, 10), calabash (3, 5, 11, 12)
- Mamadou Kelli – voice (11)
- Ali Magassa – backing vocals (2, 6, 7, 10), guitar (5)
- Etienne Mbappé – bass (6)
- Yacouba Moumouni – flute (12)
- Hammer Sankare – backing vocals (2, 5, 6, 7, 13)
- Sonny – bass (10)
- Little George Sueref – harmonica (1, 6, 8)
- Marriame Tounkara – backing vocals (12)
- Brehima Toure – backing vocals (10)
- Oumar Touré – backing vocals (2, 6, 7, 10), congas (3)
- Yves Wernert – bass (1)
