= List of Malian Grammy Award winners and nominees =

The following is a list of Grammy Awards winners and nominees from Mali:

Year	Category	Nominees(s)	Nominated for	Result
1992	Best World Music Album	Salif Keita	Amen	Nominated
1995	Best World Music Album	Ry Cooder (Note: Ry Cooder is an American musician.) and Ali Farka Touré	Talking Timbuktu	Won
2000	Best World Music Album	Ali Farka Touré	Niafunké	Nominated
2000	Best World Music Album	Salif Keita	Papa	Nominated
2003	Best World Music Album	Salif Keita	Moffou	Nominated
2006	Best Contemporary World Music Album	Amadou & Mariam	Dimanche à Bamako	Nominated
2006	Best Traditional World Music Album	Ali Farka Touré & Toumani Diabaté	In the Heart of the Moon	Won
2007	Best Contemporary World Music Album	Ali Farka Touré & Toumani Diabaté	Savane	Nominated
2007	Best Contemporary World Music Album	Salif Keita	M'Bemba	Nominated
2010	Best Contemporary World Music Album	Amadou & Mariam	Welcome to Mali	Nominated
2010	Best Contemporary World Music Album	Oumou Sangaré	Seya	Nominated
2011	Best Traditional World Music Album	Ali Farka Touré	Ali and Tounani	Won
2012	Best World Music Album	Tinariwen (Note: Tinariwen are a group of Tuareg musicians from the Sahara Desert, who formed in Algeria but currently reside in Mali.)	Tassili	Won
2013	Best World Music Album	Amadou & Mariam	Folila	Nominated
2015	Best World Music Album	Toumani Diabaté and Sidiki Diabaté	Toumani & Sidiki	Nominated
2018	Best World Music Album	Tinariwen	Elwan	Nominated
2019	Best World Music Album	Fatoumata Diawara	Fenfo	Nominated
2019	Best Dance Recording	Disclosure (Note: Disclosure are an English electronic music duo.) featuring Fatoumata Diawara	Ultimatum	Nominated
