= AfroCubism =

Studio album by AfroCubism
- Released: 2 November 2010
- Recorded: 2010
- Studio: Sonoland Studios, Madrid, Spain
- Genre: Son cubano, Mande music
- Label: World Circuit
- Producer: Nick Gold

AfroCubism is a Grammy-nominated album featuring musical collaborations between musicians from Mali and Cuba. It was released in 2010.

== Concept and recording ==
The album was recorded for the World Circuit label by producer Nick Gold and engineer Jerry Boys at Sonoland Studios, Madrid, Spain, in 2010. Mixing and mastering was done at Livingston Studios, London & FB Music and Media, Fareham.

The idea behind AfroCubism was the original concept for the Buena Vista Social Club album of 1997, which featured many of the same Cuban musicians. This concept however, was thwarted when the Cuban visas for the Malian musicians were delayed in the post, and producer Nick Gold instead called on the services of Ry Cooder, whom he had recorded with Ali Farka Touré for the 1994 World Circuit release Talking Timbuktu. The album captures the rhythmic and melodic patterns that are common to traditional West African and Afro-Cuban music. The musicians involved in AfroCubism already had successful careers through participation in the Buena Vista Social Club or as solo artists. The project has subsequently toured around the world as a successful live show.

== Critical reception ==
Professional ratings
Review scores
Source	Rating
AllMusic	3.5/5 stars
Uncut	5/5 stars

The album was praised by AllMusic reviewer James Allen, who described it as "a true musical meeting of minds between the two cultures [Cuban and Malian]".

== Track listing ==
1. Mali Cuba
2. Al vaivén de mi carreta
3. Karamo
4. Djelimady Rumba
5. La culebra
6. Jarabi
7. Eliades tumbao 27
8. Dakan
9. Nima diyala
10. A la luna yo me voy
11. Para los pinares se va Montoro
12. Benséma
13. Guantanamera

== Personnel ==
Cuban musicians

- Eliades Ochoa – guitar, vocals
- José Ángel Martínez – double bass
- Jorge Maturell – congas, bongos, cowbell
- Onsel Odit – chorus, rhythm guitar
- Eglis Ochoa – maracas, güiro, chorus

Malian musicians

- Toumani Diabaté – kora
- Bassekou Kouyate – ngoni
- Kassé Mady Diabaté – vocals
- Djelimady Tounkara – guitars
- Fode Lassana Diabaté – balafon
- Baba Sissoko – talking drum

== See also ==
- Afro-Cuban All Stars
