= The Source (Ali Farka Touré album) =

Studio album by Ali Farka Touré
- Released: 1992, 1993
- Genre: World
- Length: 60:21
- Label: World Circuit
- Producers: Nick Gold, Ali Farka Touré

Ali Farka Touré chronology
The River (1991)	The Source (1992)	Talking Timbuktu (1994)

Professional ratings
Review scores
Source	Rating
AllMusic	4.5/5 stars
Robert Christgau	(2-star Honorable Mention)
The Encyclopedia of Popular Music	3/5 stars

The Source is an album by Ali Farka Touré.

The album peaked at No. 1 on the Billboard World Albums chart.

== Critical reception ==
The Los Angeles Times wrote that "one of the most impressive performances is on 'Cin quante Six,' a solo instrumental: Toure establishes a cleanly picked folk rhythm, then overlays a flamenco-flavored melody that suggests a meeting of Leo Kottke and the Gipsy Kings." Trouser Press called the album "most notable for the way it challenges the singer to move beyond blues ('Hawa Dolo') and to eschew simple guitar riffing for more intricate single-note lines ('Roucky')."

== Track listing ==
1. "Goye Kur" – 6:24
2. "Inchana Massina" – 5:13
3. "Roucky" – 8:18
4. "Dofana" – 7:31
5. "Karaw" – 6:28
6. "Hawa Dolo" – 5:47
7. "Cinquante Six" – 5:31
8. "I Go Ka" – 3:59
9. "Yenna" – 5:54
10. "Mahini Me" – 5:24

== Personnel ==
- Ali Farka Touré (vocals 1–6, 8–10; electric guitar 1–2,5,9; acoustic guitar 1,3-8,10; n'jarka 1; maracas 4)
- Afel Bocoum (vocals 1–2, 4–6; narration 4)
- Hamma Sankare (calabash 1,2,4,5,6,8; vocals 1,2,4,5)
- Oumar Touré (congas 2,5,6; vocals 2,5)
- Nitin Sawney (tabla 2)
- Taj Mahal (acoustic guitar 3,10)
- Rory McLeod (acoustic guitar 3)
- Groupe Asko (backing vocals 3,10)
- Amadou Cisse (calabash 9; vocals 9)
