= List of UK Jazz & Blues Albums Chart number ones of 1994 =

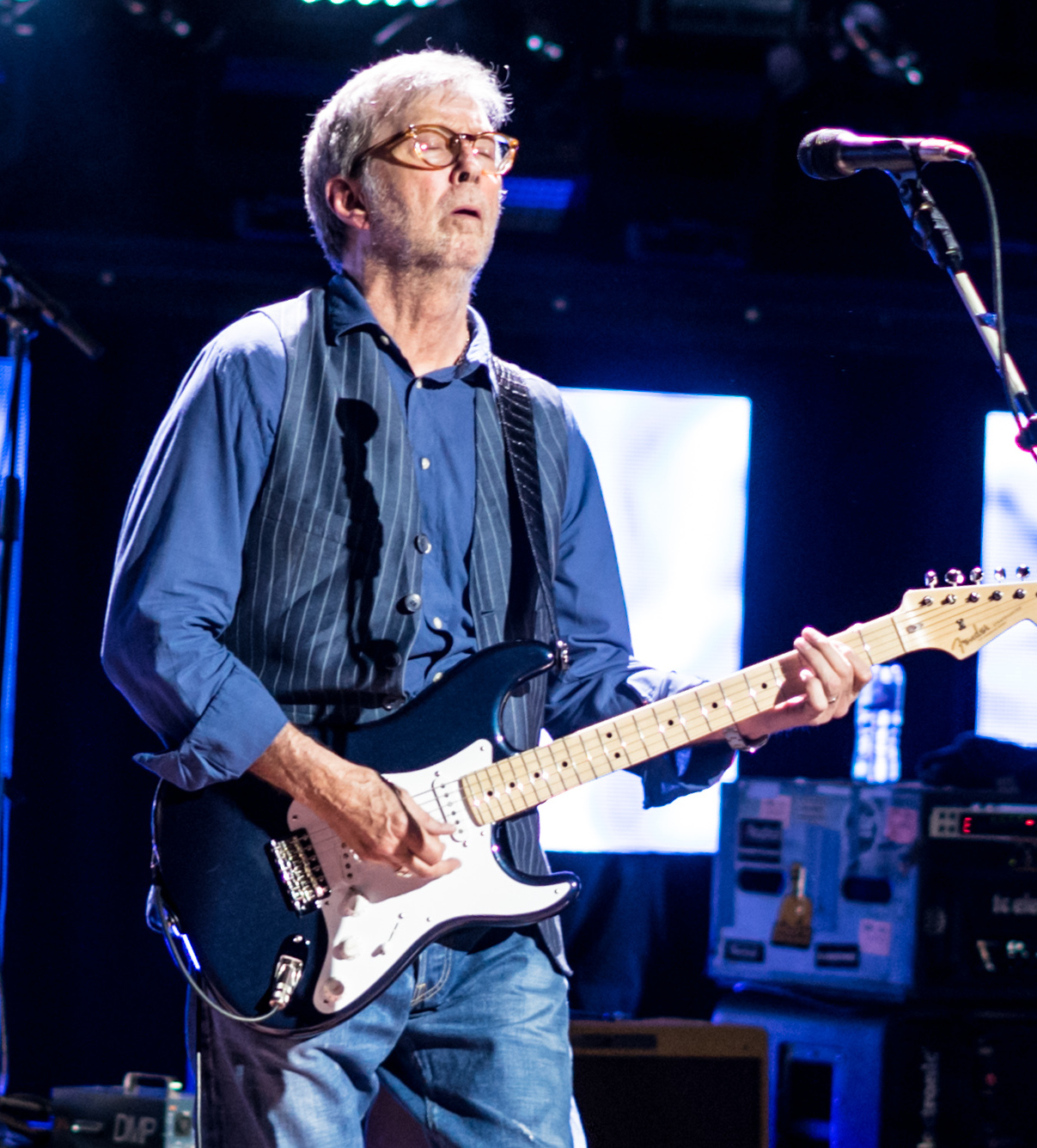
Eric Clapton's From the Cradle was the longest-running UK Jazz & Blues Albums Chart number one of 1994, spending seven weeks atop the chart.

The UK Jazz & Blues Albums Chart is a record chart which ranks the best-selling jazz and blues albums in the United Kingdom. Compiled and published by the Official Charts Company, the data is based on each album's weekly physical sales, digital downloads and streams. In 1994, 29 charts were published with 11 albums at number one. The first number-one album of the year was Muddy Water Blues: A Tribute to Muddy Waters by Paul Rodgers, which spent the first two weeks of 1994 atop the chart. The last number-one of the year was the Louis Armstrong compilation We Have All the Time in the World, which was number one for ten straight weeks.

The most successful album on the UK Jazz & Blues Albums Chart in 1994 was Eric Clapton's 12th solo studio album From the Cradle, which spent a total of seven weeks at number one, including the longest consecutive run of the year of five weeks between 18 September and 22 October 1994. The Telstar various artists compilation Jazz Moods spent four weeks at number one during May, while Breathless by Kenny G, She by Harry Connick Jr. and We Have All the Time in the World by Armstrong were each number one for three weeks at various points during 1994. From the Cradle finished 1994 as the 88th best-selling album of the year in the UK.

== Chart history ==
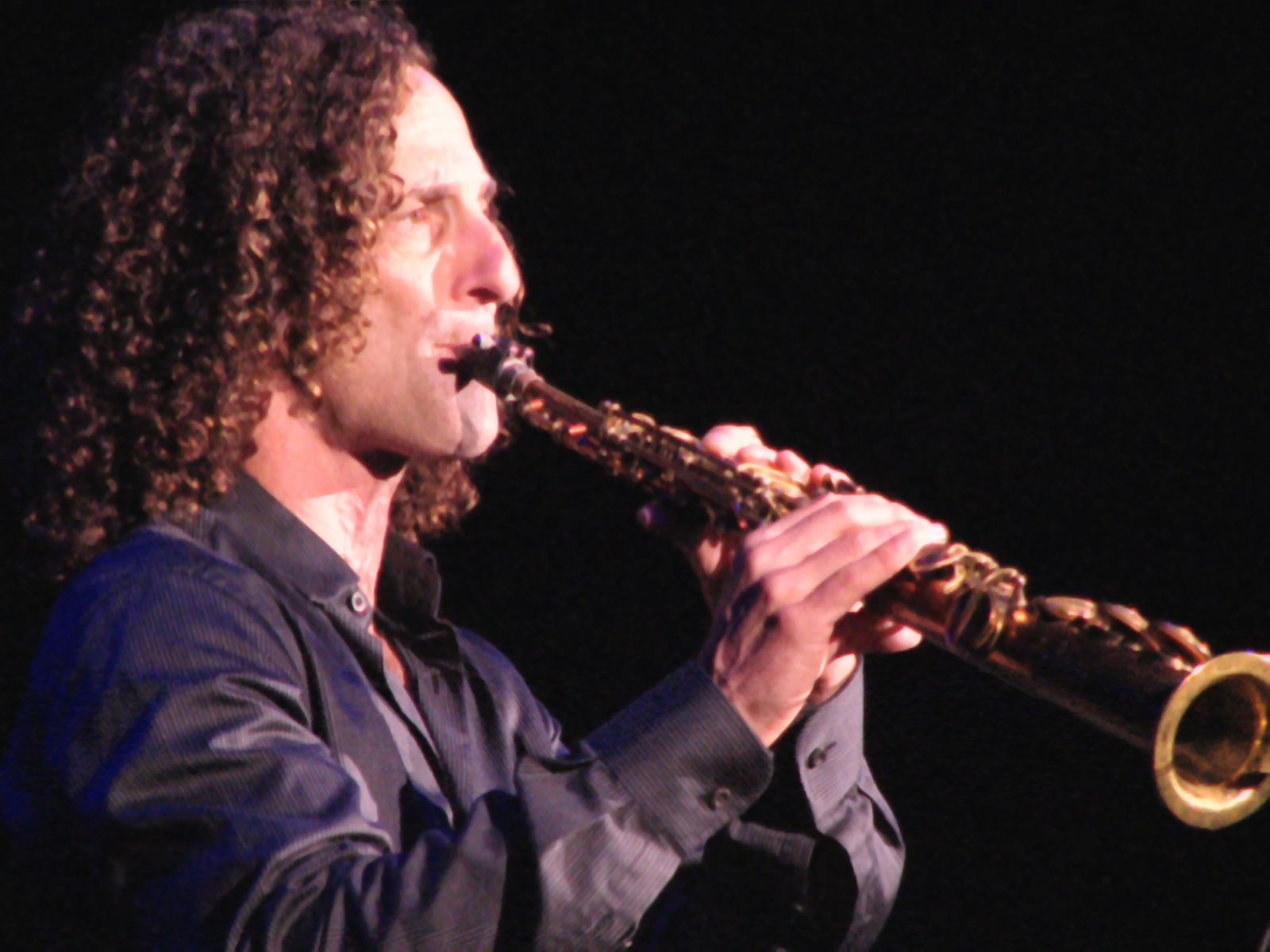
Kenny G's sixth album Breathless topped the UK Jazz & Blues Albums Chart in February 1994 and remained number one for three consecutive weeks.

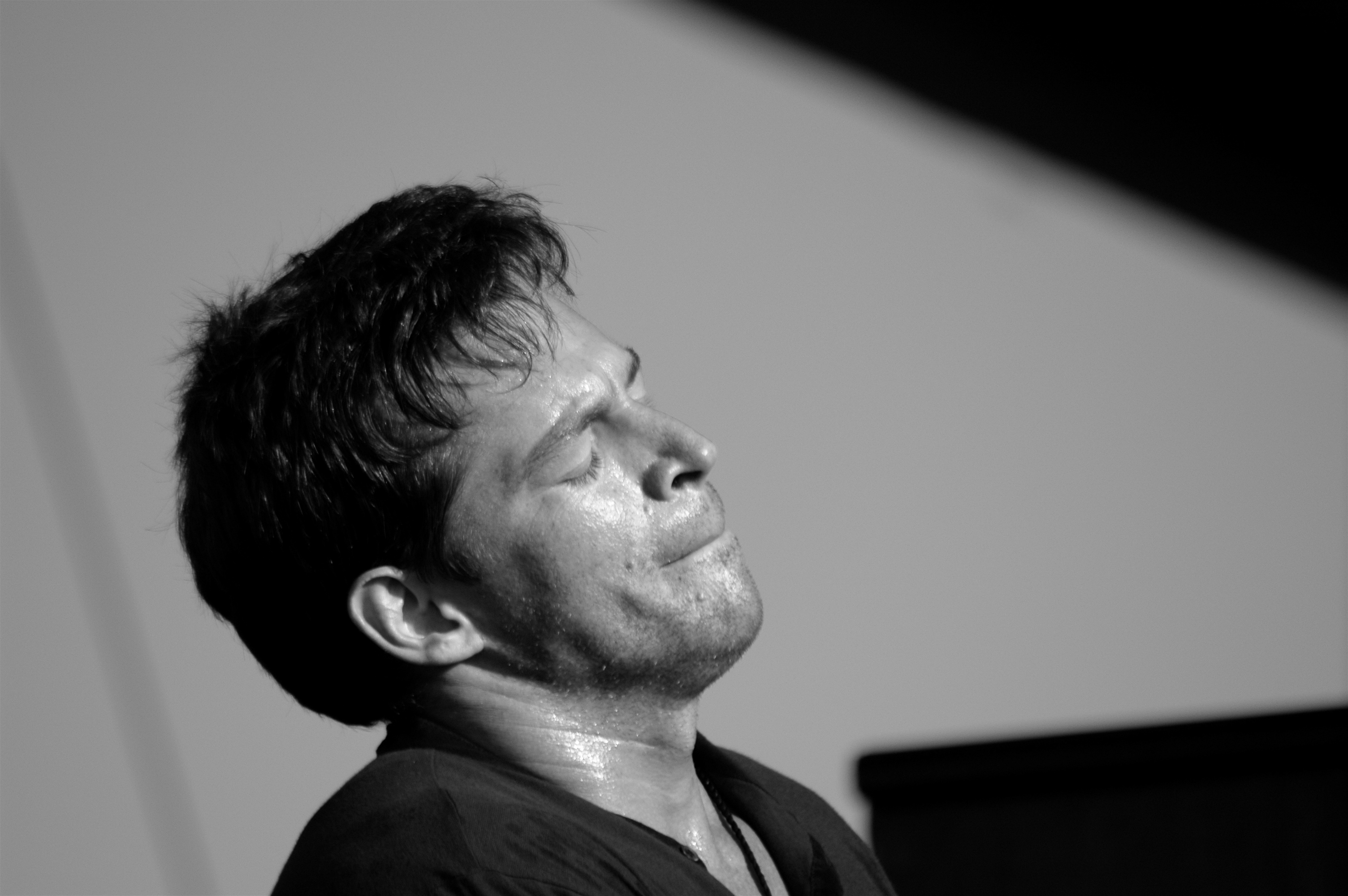
Harry Connick Jr. was also number one for three weeks in 1994 with his sixth vocal and tenth overall album, She.

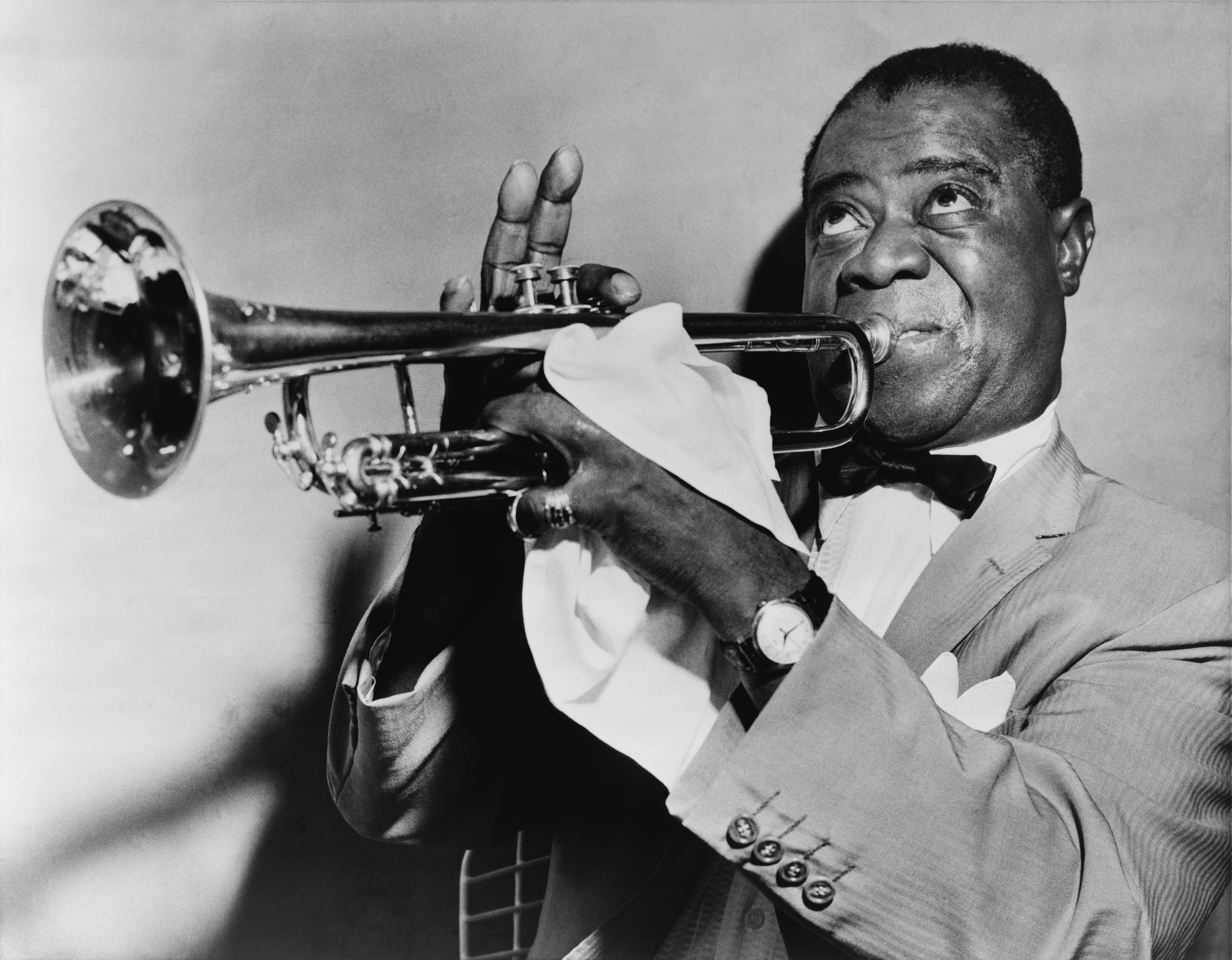
Louis Armstrong's We Have All the Time in the World was number one for the last three weeks of 1994 and the first seven weeks of 1995.

Key
†	Indicates best-selling jazz/blues album of 1994

Issue date	Album	Artist(s)	Record label(s)	Ref.
30 January	Muddy Water Blues: A Tribute to Muddy Waters	Paul Rodgers	London	
6 February	Muddy Water Blues: A Tribute to Muddy Waters	Paul Rodgers	London	
13 February	Breathless	Kenny G	Arista	
20 February	Breathless	Kenny G	Arista	
27 February	Breathless	Kenny G	Arista	
6 March	Talking Timbuktu	Ali Farka Touré, Ry Cooder	World Circuit	
8 May	Jazz Moods	various artists	Telstar	
15 May	Jazz Moods	various artists	Telstar	
22 May	Jazz Moods	various artists	Telstar	
29 May	Jazz Moods	various artists	Telstar	
21 August	She	Harry Connick Jr.	Columbia	
28 August	She	Harry Connick Jr.	Columbia	
4 September	She	Harry Connick Jr.	Columbia	
11 September	Officium	Jan Garbarek, Hilliard Ensemble	ECM	
18 September	From the Cradle †	Eric Clapton	Duck	
25 September	From the Cradle †	Eric Clapton	Duck	
2 October	From the Cradle †	Eric Clapton	Duck	
9 October	From the Cradle †	Eric Clapton	Duck	
16 October	From the Cradle †	Eric Clapton	Duck	
23 October	The Lady Sings the Blues	various artists	Pure	
30 October	The Lady Sings the Blues	various artists	Pure	
6 November	From the Cradle †	Eric Clapton	Duck	
13 November	From the Cradle †	Eric Clapton	Duck	
20 November	Ballads & Blues 1982–1994	Gary Moore	Virgin	
27 November	Ballads & Blues 1982–1994	Gary Moore	Virgin	
4 December	Essential Ella	Ella Fitzgerald	Verve	
11 December	We Have All the Time in the World	Louis Armstrong	EMI	
18 December	We Have All the Time in the World	Louis Armstrong	EMI	
25 December	We Have All the Time in the World	Louis Armstrong	EMI	

== See also ==
- 1994 in British music
