= The River (Ali Farka Touré album) =

Studio album by Ali Farka Touré
- Released: January 1990
- Studio: Studio Bolibana in Paris; Cold Storage Studios and Garden Studios in London
- Genre: Blues
- Length: 66:38
- Label: World Circuit
- Producer: Philippe Bertrand, Nick Gold

Ali Farka Touré chronology
African Blues (1990)	The River (1990)	The Source (1993)

The River is a studio album by Malian singer and multi-instrumentalist Ali Farka Touré. It was recorded in sessions at Studio Bolibana in Paris, and at the London-based Cold Storage Studios and Garden Studios. The album was released by the UK-based World Circuit label and distributed internationally by Mango Records.

== Critical reception ==
Professional ratings
Review scores
Source	Rating
AllMusic	4.5/5 stars
The Village Voice	A−

Reviewing the album for The Village Voice, Robert Christgau gave it an A-minus and applauded its attempts to cross over in the form of "tracks colored with harmonica, saxophone, fiddle and bodhran, and the single-stringed njarka that Touré picks up for the finale--not to mention an extra edge of vocal command." Overall, the album offered a "variety, not compromise", that Christgau believed Touré had needed on his earlier recordings, which "drifted into the folkloric". In an interview for Guy Oseary's On the Record (2004), music entrepreneur and record collector Craig Kallman named The River among his 15 favorite records.

== Track listing ==
1. "Heygana" – 5:59
2. "Goydiotodam" – 6:25
3. "Ai Bine" – 6:21
4. "Tangambara" – 5:22
5. "Toungere" – 7:32
6. "Jungou" – 7:23
7. "Kenouna" – 5:02
8. "Boyrei" – 5:23
9. "Tamala" – 8:06
10. "Lobo" – 6:44
11. "Instrumental" – 2:59

== Personnel ==
- Ali Farka Touré – vocals, electric guitar, acoustic guitar, njarka
- Amadou Cisse – calabash, percussion, vocals
- Mamaye Kouyate – ngoni (tracks 3 and 7)
- Rory McLeod – harmonica (track 1)
- Seane Keane and Kevin Conneff – fiddle and bodhran (track 7)
- Steve Williamson - tenor saxophone (track 3)
