= African blues (disambiguation) =

African blues may refer to:

- African blues, a loose term for the West African genre related to the blues of North America
- African Blues (Ali Farka Touré album), a 1988 album by Ali Farka Touré
- African Blues (compilation album), a 1998 album produced by the World Music Network
