= Ali Farka Touré (album) =

Studio album by Ali Farka Touré
- Released: 1988
- Recorded: October 4, 1987
- Genres: Mande music, folk, blues
- Length: 58:16
- Labels: World Circuit; Mango

Ali Farka Touré chronology
Farka (1976)	Ali Farka Touré (1988)	African Blues (1990)

Ali Farka Touré is an album by the Malian musician Ali Farka Touré. It was recorded in London.

== Critical reception ==
Professional ratings
Review scores
Source	Rating
AllMusic	5/5 stars

The New York Times wrote that Touré picks "out patterns so light and lilting that their intricate cross-rhythms sound easy; his voice, an earthy tenor, shares the guitar's modal melody lines or slides in between, and he underlines the syncopations with the slapping sound of overdubbed bongos." The Los Angeles Times noted that he "concentrates on measured, mid-tempo tunes that showcase his throaty vocals and rich guitar tone with minimal percussion accompaniment."

== Track listing ==
All songs written by Ali Farka Touré.

1. Timbarma – 5:08
2. Singya – 5:26
3. Nawiye – 5:40
4. Bakoytereye – 5:02
5. Tchigi Fo – 4:30
6. Amandrai – 7:19
7. Kadi Kadi – 5:27
8. Yulli – 5:19
9. Bakoye – 4:10
10. Amandrai (Live) – 10:01

Tracks 5 and 6 do not appear on vinyl.

Tracks 4 and 9 recorded at Capital Radio Studios, London, on September 13, 1987.

Track 10 recorded during performance for Crossing the Border Festival at the Town and Country Club, London, on October 5, 1987.

== Personnel ==
- Ali Farka Touré – vocals, guitar, calabash, bongos
- Toumani Diabaté – calabash on track 6
