= Songhai =

Songhai may refer to:

== People ==
- Songhai people, an ethnic group of western Africa
- Songhaiborai, a subgroup of the Songhai people
- Safiya Songhai (born 1984), American film director

== Other uses ==
- Songhai Empire, a former country
- The Songhai, a geographic area in Niger
- Songhai or Songhay languages, a group of closely related languages
- Songhai (album), a 1988 fusion flamenco album by Spanish band Ketama
- Songhai (musical collaboration), a world music group including the band Ketama
- Songhoy Blues, a desert blues music group from Mali
