= The Mandé Variations =

Studio album by Toumani Diabaté
- Released: February 25, 2008
- Recorded: Livingston Studios, London
- Genre: Mande music
- Length: 57:49
- Label: World Circuit (UK); Nonesuch Records (US)
- Producer: Nick Gold

Toumani Diabaté chronology
Boulevard de l'Independance (2006)	The Mandé Variations (2008)	Ali and Toumani (2010)

The Mandé Variations is a 2008 studio album by Toumani Diabaté, produced by Nick Gold for World Circuit. Unlike many of his recordings which feature large ensembles, it consists of solo Kora throughout. The influences range from traditional Kora pieces to modern Western music.

The album was released in the United Kingdom on 25 February 2008 by World Circuit, and in the United States on 26 February 2008 by Nonesuch Records.

== Critical reception ==
Professional ratings
Review scores
Source	Rating
AllMusic	4/5 stars
The Guardian	4/5 stars
The Independent	(favourable)
MusicOMH	4/5 stars
The Observer	4/5 stars
Pitchfork	8.3/10
Robert Christgau	(dud)
Tom Hull	B+
Uncut	4/5 stars

A 2008 review in Pitchfork notes that The Mandé Variations is only the second solo work recorded by Diabate; the first being 1988's Kaira, which was released 20 years prior. "Here it's just Diabaté and his unadorned kora, recorded with maximum clarity as he pays tribute to his roots and peers." The review calls the album "casually captivating from start to finish" and "haunting", noting "the awe inspired by hearing music this pure woven from the hands of a man.".

== Track listing ==
1. "Si naani" – 10:31
2. "Elyne Road" – 8:50
3. "Ali Farka Toure" – 6:20
4. "Kaounding Cissoko" – 6:27
5. "Ismael Drame" – 5:45
6. "Djourou Kara Nany" – 6:53
7. "El Nabiyouna" – 6:03
8. "Cantelowes" – 6:57

== Personnel ==
- Toumani Diabaté, kora
