= Kassé Mady Diabaté =

Malian musician (1949–2018)

- Born: 1949; Kela, Kangaba, Mali
- Origin: Mali
- Died: April 24, 2018 (aged 68–69) Bamako, Mali
- Genres: Folk; world music

Kassé Mady Diabaté (1949, in Kela, Kangaba, Mali – May 24, 2018, in Bamako) was a Malian singer, musician and griot. His soft and particular voice with deep undertones – an atypical characteristic for a griot – earned him the nickname "The golden voice of Mali". He is considered, together with Salif Keita, as one of the greatest Mandinka artists of his generation.

== Early life and education ==
Kassé Mady Diabaté was born in Kela town in Koulikoro Region, known as the capital of griots with a rich musical tradition. The Diabaté family was one of the two biggest griots families. Their ancestor Morykaba Diabaté took part in fighting with Soundjata in the 13th century.

He is a nephew of a notable Malian griot Siramori Diabaté. His grandfather Bintu'amma was a well-known musician and master of ngoni. His brother Abdoulaye Diabaté is a famous singer and guitarist.

== Music career ==
In the early 1970s Kassé Mady Diabaté started singing with Super Mande band led by his brother Abdoulaye Diabaté. After assisting them in winning the 1973 Biennale festival, he was recruited by Las Maravillas de Mali. This band had recently returned from eight years in Cuba. Around 1976, the band changed its name to National Badema du Mali, but by the mid-1980s, its big band sound was no longer popular. Kassé Mady joined the expanding number of West African musicians who immigrated to Paris, where he released two solo albums. Fodé was released in 1989 and featured hi-tech sounds. A year later, he released a more acoustic album Kela Tradition, which featured an epic rendition of the traditional ballad Kulanjan. He participated in several transversal projects, notably inspired by flamenco or blues.

In 1994 he participated in Songhai 2 album recording by Toumani Diabaté.

In 1998 he returned to Mali, where there was a rebirth of interest in traditional acoustic music. In 1999, he made a guest appearance on the album Kulanjan by Taj Mahal and Toumani Diabaté. The success of the Kulanjan project enabled the creation of his autobiographical album Kassi Kasse, which Kassé Mady recorded in his hometown Kela. The album featured Toumani Diabaté's guest appearance on kora, and in addition to the typical Malian instruments n'goni and balafon, also the rarely heard simbi (hunter's harp).

In 2003 he was nominated for the BBC Radio 3 Awards for World Music.

In 2004 his album Kassi Kasse which he worked on with Brincando Na Roda, was nominated for the Grammy Award for Best Traditional World Music Album.

In 2010 he participated in the album AfroCubism recorded in Madrid, Spain, by Cuban guitarist Eliades Ochoa together with Malian musicians Toumani Diabaté, Lassana Diabaté, Djelimady Tounkara, Bassekou Kouyaté and Baba Sissoko.

He accompanied Jordi Savall in 2015 as singer and arranger of several "chants de griot", on a series of concerts (including the Saint-Denis festival) and the recording of the album Les Routes de l'esclavage.

== Personal life ==
Kassé Mady Diabaté died on May 24, 2018, in Bamako at the age of 69, following a stroke. His daughter Hawa Kassé Mady Diabaté is also a singer and a vocalist at Trio Da Kali.

== Discography ==
- 1989: Fodé
- 1990: Kela Tradition
- 2002: Kassi Kassé – Mande Music From Mali
- 2008: Manden Djeli Kan
- 2009: There Was A Time (with African Classical Music Ensemble)
- 2014: Kiriké

== Awards ==
He was elevated to the rank of officer of the National Order of Mali in December 2017.
