= African Blues (compilation album) =

Compilation album by Various artists
- Released: 9 June 1998
- Genre: World, African blues
- Length: 77:35
- Label: World Music Network

Full series chronology
The Rough Guide to English Roots Music (1998)	African Blues (1998)	The Rough Guide to the Music of South Africa (1998)

African Blues is a world music benefit compilation album originally released in 1998, with proceeds going to Voluntary Service Overseas. Part of the World Music Network Rough Guides series, the release features African blues (a genre which is not simply an African re-interpretation of the American style, but carrying on traditions that were also exported to the Americas—see Origins of the blues). The compilation was produced and coordinated by Phil Stanton & Sandra Alayón-Stanton, co-founders of the World Music Network. Though they are named differently (the Rough Guide designation being omitted in this release and only found in the catalogue number, common practice for the label's charity releases), 2007's The Rough Guide to African Blues is sometimes considered this album's second edition.

Mali is represented in this album five times, Guinea twice, and Senegal, Zimbabwe, the DRC, Kenya, Mozambique, the ROC, and Cape Verde once each.

== Critical reception ==
Professional ratings
Review scores
Source	Rating
Allmusic	4/5 stars

Writing for AllMusic, Adam Greenberg found relevance in the album for its "relatively early collection" of artists who would subsequently become the biggest African stars in the world music scene over the next decade. According to Greenberg, though not all tracks remained within the delineated genre, the music remained "worthwhile".

== Track listing ==
No.	Title	Artist (Country)	Length
1.	"Talibe"	Ismaël Lô (Senegal)	4:19
2.	"Mouneïssa"	Rokia Traoré (Mali)	5:44
3.	"A Va Safy Va Lomo"	Orchestra Marrabenta Star De Mocambique (Mozambique)	6:09
4.	"Mansa"	Super Rail Band (Mali)	6:33
5.	"Paulette"	Balla et ses Balladins (Guinea)	7:43
6.	"Maggie"	Alick Nkhata (Zambia)	2:28
7.	"Omulanga Wamuka"	Henry Makobi (Kenya)	3:53
8.	"Heygana"	Ali Farka Touré (Mali)	5:59
9.	"Ndinderere"	Stella Chiweshe (Zimbabwe)	4:58
10.	"Shams Esh'shamusa"	Hamza El Din (Egypt)	5:15
11.	"N'Sangou"	Antoine Moundanda (Republic of the Congo)	4:11
12.	"Mouso Teke Soma Ye"	Boubacar Traoré (Mali)	6:18
13.	"Kankan Blues"	Balla Kalla & Kante Manfila (Guinea)	2:50
14.	"Miss Perfumado"	Cesária Évora (Cape Verde)	4:27
15.	"Saa Magni"	Oumou Sangare (Mali)	7:35
