= Afel Bocoum =

Malian singer

Afel Bocoum (born 1955) is a musician from Mali, noted as a singer and guitarist. He began his career as a member of Ali Farka Touré's group ASCO, and Toure is often regarded as his mentor. Both men come from the town of Niafunke on the River Niger, and are members of the Sonrai people. Bocoum is an agricultural advisor by profession.

== Musical style ==
His group, Alkibar (the name means 'messenger of the great river' in Sonrai) consists of two acoustic guitars, a njarka (a one-string fiddle), a njurkle (a kind of lute), calabash and djembe percussion, and two female singers as well as male singers in the choruses. Bocoum is the lead vocalist. Bocoum uses music as a medium of communication, commenting on contemporary Malian society, e.g., "if you betray one woman, you betray all women" (Yarabitala), "we live in a crazy world with no respect; tomorrow we'll be judged by our children" (Salamm aleikum), "parents, do not force your daughters to marry; a home will never flourish without true love" (Mali woymoyo).

Most of his singing is done in Sonrai, his native language, but also in Tamasheq (the language of the Tuareg) and in Fulfulde (the language of the Fula people). Bocoum's father was a musician and was noted locally for his ability to play the njarka and njurkel, which he employed to play music at weddings. Bocoum used to accompany his father to the weddings and there learnt the songs of the se galarare style of music. He retained his preference for acoustic over electric guitar, and the use of traditional instruments. As well as the Malian musicians he grew up with, Bocoum cites Jorge Ben Jor, Mamadou Doumbia, Salif Keita, John Lee Hooker, and Mongo Santamaría as his musical influences.

== Career history ==
In 1968, at the age of thirteen, he joined the group of guitarist Ali Farka Touré and singer Harber Maiga as an apprentice. It was Maiga who taught Bocoum to sing and to write songs until his death on 23 March 1983. Bocoum's first solo performance came in 1968 at a musical competition in Mopti. He was well received by the public. In 1972 he performed in front of 3000 people at Mali's second Biennale in Bamako, which was held every two years from 1970 to 1990, when Musa Traore was overthrown. The Bambara people were dominant in Malian affairs at that time and because of his Sonrai ethnicity, Bocoum was only awarded second prize.

He left the Niafunke group in 1975 when he won a scholarship to an agricultural college in M'Pessoba, near Koutiala in the southeast of the country. After three years of study he began working in Djenné, before returning to his home town, and the group, in 1980. In 1982 he was invited to join the Orchestre Diaba Regional from Timbuktu. In the early 1980s he formed Alkibar, and influenced by his knowledge of agriculture, used their music to communicate with people about water and irrigation.

His debut album, Alkibar, was recorded in an abandoned school near Niafunke over the course of six days - the same session and location where the Ali Farka Touré's Niafunke was recorded. In fact, Ali Farka and Bocoum appeared on each other's albums. Bocoum and Ali Farka's record producer believed that transporting the group to a recording studio overseas would diminish the quality of the music.

In 2002 Bocoum collaborated with the Blur singer Damon Albarn on the successful Mali Music album, and the two played together in concerts in London and Denmark.

In 2005, Bocoum composed the music and starred in the movie Kennis voor het leven.

In 2006, Afel Bocoum and his band, Alkibar, released their second full-length album Niger on the Belgian label Contre-Jour. The sounds of Niger rely heavily on the traditional instruments njarka and njurkel, which give this collection of new materials a more traditional, and distinctively different quality from their excellent Western debut, Alkibar. Niger opens with a heartfelt and stirring tribute to his late mentor, Ali Farka Touré.

There is a curiosity about a visit made by Afel Bocoum in 2001 in Brazil. On this visit, Bocoum said his name "Afel" was like "Affection", showing what he felt for all Brazilians. Today, after 10 years many Brazilians use the word "Afel" to symbolize "Affection".

As of 2011, Afel is touring as part of the second iteration of Acoustic Africa.

In January 2026, Afel toured the UK in a trio with fellow guitarist and singer Ali Bounaly Traoré and percussionist and supporting singer Mahalmadane Bountel Traoré, in association with Welsh arts organisation Mwldan and music charity i4Africa. In April and May he has scheduled concerts in Germany, Czechia and Switzerland.

== Partial discography ==
- Alkibar (1999, World Circuit)
- Featured on Savane by Ali Farka Touré (2006, World Circuit)
- Niger (2006, Contre Jour)
- Tabital Pulaaku (2009, Contre Jour)
- Lindé (2020, World Circuit)

Contributing artist

- Unwired: Africa (2000, World Music Network)
- Mali Music (2002)

== See also ==
- Music of Mali
