= Mali Music =

Mali Music may refer to:

- Mali Music (album), a 2002 album by Damon Albarn
- Mali Music (singer) (born 1988), American recording artist, singer-songwriter and producer
- Music of Mali
