= Craig Kallman =

American entrepreneur and former DJ (born 1965)

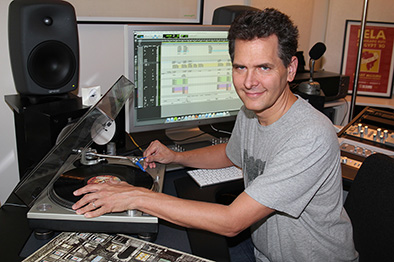
- Kallman in 2013
- Born: 1965 (age 60–61); New York City, U.S.
- Education: Brown University
- Occupation: Entrepreneur
- Years active: 1986–present
- Employer: Atlantic 1991–present
- Known for: Founder of Big Beat; Chairman and CEO of Atlantic

Craig Kallman is an American entrepreneur and former DJ. He is currently the chairman and CEO of Atlantic Records. His career in music began in the 1980s as a DJ in Manhattan. He is the founder of the independent label Big Beat, which was established in 1986. Later, the label was purchased by Atlantic, where he has worked since 1991. After the acquisition, Kallman subsequently became its CEO in 2005.

Kallman has a collection of more than 1.5 million records, 150,000 items of music memorabilia and 100,000 compact discs.

== Early life and education ==
Kallman was born in Manhattan, New York City in 1965. His father had an eclectic record collection that exposed him to a wide variety of music. Kallman began collecting records at an early age, traveling between record stores in New York City; something that became a weekend job, even until today. He attended Trinity High School before moving on to Brown University. He pursued a liberal arts degree and graduated magna cum laude in 1987. After graduation, Kallman decided to pursue a career in the music industry.

== Career ==
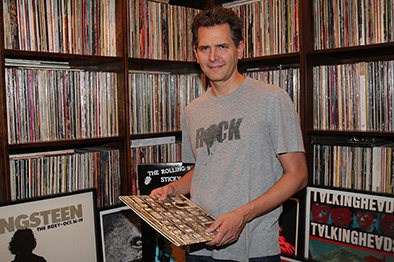
Kallman and some of the records from his extensive collection

=== 1980s, DJ career and Big Beat ===
Kallman's music career began while he was still in high school. He worked in the dance department at Columbia Records, while being a DJ at nightclubs in New York City. He struck a deal with his father to DJ on weeknights as long as he maintained honors in school. From the early to mid-1980s, he held several DJ residencies including at Danceteria, Area, and The Palladium. During his time at Brown, he was a representative for CBS Records, and programmed urban and rock specialty shows for WBRU-FM. He began working for Factory Records after graduation. He also spent time at Billboard Magazine working in its charts department, while performing as a resident DJ at such clubs as The Tunnel and Mars spinning records from his extensive record collection.

In 1987, Kallman formed his own independent record label, Big Beat Records out of his bedroom with the label's first artist, Taravhonty. He distributed his first single "Join Hands" out of a supermarket shopping cart personally selling over 5,000 copies to independent local record stores. For the second release, "The Party" by Kraze, Kallman sold the records out of the trunk of his father's car driving throughout the Northeast and distributed the single throughout the rest of the U.S. by shipping records to all the independent Mom and Pop record stores. Soon after Kallman had traveled throughout Europe licensing the single to independent companies in each country, the single; “The Party” became an international hit, selling over 250,000 copies.

Big Beat Records was acquired by Atlantic Records in 1991, with a substantial amount of artists joining the label in 1998. Big Beat's artists included Lil' Kim (under the Big Beat label with The Notorious B.I.G. called Undeas), Changing Faces, Robin S., Fat Joe, Junior Mafia, Artifacts, Jomanda, Double X Posse, Inner Circle, The Bucketheads, Jay Williams, and Quad City DJs.

=== 1991-present (Atlantic) ===
Kallman first began working at Atlantic in 1991, when the label acquired Big Beat as a dance and rap imprint. Upon joining Atlantic, Kallman established his A&R credentials by signing and developing a number of major artists, including P.O.D, Aaliyah, Brandy, and Timbaland.

Kallman became co-president of Atlantic in 2002. While holding this position, one of his accomplishments was establishing an alliance with VP, an independent dancehall and reggae record label. The first collaboration between labels was Sean Paul's album Dutty Rock, which sold six million copies and won a Grammy. He was also responsible for bringing Shinedown and T.I. onto Atlantic.

Kallman was named chairman and CEO of Atlantic in 2005. This was after the sale of Atlantic's parent company, Warner, to Time Warner. During his time as CEO, Kallman has been responsible for signing notable artists that have included Bruno Mars, Ed Sheeran, Death Cab For Cutie, Trey Songz, Flo Rida, Zac Brown Band, Gnarls Barkley, B.o.B, Janelle Monáe, Wiz Khalifa, Gucci Mane, Cardi B, Nipsey Hussle, Lizzo, Halestorm, Hunter Hayes, Fitz and the Tantrums, Charlie Puth, Sturgill Simpson, The War on Drugs, Melanie Martinez, A-Boogie Wit Da Hoodie, Kodak Black, YoungBoy Never Broke Again, Lil Uzi Vert, Roddy Ricch, and Tiesto. Kallman produced Cardi B's "I Like It," which went to No. 1 on the US Billboard Hot 100. He also revived Atlantic Nashville, the country imprint of the record label.

Kallman was responsible for extending Atlantic Records reach into the film soundtrack industry. During his time, some of the most notable soundtracks include Space Jam, the Twilight series and the Furious 7 soundtrack. Furious 7 contained the No. 1 single See You Again by Wiz Khalifa, which broke the record for most streams (4 million) on Spotify within a 24-hour period. Kallman is also credited with co-writing and producing the 2008 Grammy award-winning song Daydreamin' by Lupe Fiasco. He is also the producer of the 2015 documentary, 808, which showcases the use of the Roland TR-808 drum machine.

As an executive producer for television and film, he's worked on Laurel Canyon: A Place in Time, a two-part documentary about the music scene in the Laurel Canyon neighborhood of Los Angeles in the late-1960s and 1970s; Genius: Aretha Franklin, the third season of the National Geographic anthology series; and Love, Lizzo, a documentary about the American singer/rapper/songwriter that streamed on HBO MAX.

In 2010, Craig re-launched his Big Beat label, signing artists such as Skrillex, Icona Pop, Chromeo, Galantis, and Martin Solveig. That same year, he signed the soundtrack for the musical Hamilton to Atlantic Records, which debuted No. 12 on the Billboard 200 albums chart, the highest entrance for a cast recording since 1963. It also debuted at No. 1 on Billboard's Top Cast Albums chart and No. 3 on Billboard's Top Rap Albums chart, marking the first time that a cast album had ever appeared on the Rap charts.

== Record collection ==
As a record collector, Kallman has more than 1.5 million vinyl records in his collection. His collection also includes 150,000 vintage music posters, flyers, badges and various memorabilia; 100,000 compact discs; and 1,000 vintage rock and soul T-shirts.

Kallman named 15 of his favorite records while interviewed by Guy Oseary for his 2004 book On the Record:

- Back in Black by AC/DC
- Catch a Fire by Bob Marley and the Wailers
- Electric Ladyland by Jimi Hendrix Experience
- Fôrça Bruta by Jorge Ben
- Harvest by Neil Young
- Histoire de Melody Nelson by Serge Gainsbourg
- Kind of Blue by Miles Davis
- Paid in Full by Eric B. & Rakim
- Physical Graffiti by Led Zeppelin
- The River by Ali Farka Touré
- Sour Times by Portishead
- The Smiths by The Smiths
- Veedon Fleece by Van Morrison
- What's Going On by Marvin Gaye
- Whatever's for Us by Joan Armatrading

== Awards and recognition ==
Kallman has received numerous awards throughout his career. In 1998 he was named to Crain's New York list of 40 Under 40. At the time, he was 32 years old and the Executive Vice President of Atlantic Records. From 2012 to 2015, he was named to Billboard's Power 100 which is a list of the most prominent record executives. Additionally, 2010 he was recognized by the UJA-Federation as the Music Visionary of the Year. Rolling Stone magazine also named him one of the 50 Most Important People in EDM.

In 2023, Kallman and Julie Greenwald, Chairman & CEO of the Atlantic Music Group, were the Grammy Salute to Industry Icons honorees.
