= Radio Mali =

Studio album by Ali Farka Touré
- Released: 1996
- Genre: World
- Length: 1:12:06
- Label: World Circuit
- Producer: Nick Gold

Ali Farka Touré chronology
Talking Timbuktu (1994)	Radio Mali (1996)	Niafunké (1999)

Radio Mali is an album by Ali Farka Touré, consisting of remastered selections from several earlier albums originally recorded between 1975 and 1980.

== Track listing ==
1. "Njarka" – 0:43
2. "Yer Mali Gakoyoyo" – 4:47
3. "Soko" – 5:06
4. "Bandalabourou" – 6:41
5. "Machengoidi" – 2:41
6. "Samariya" – 5:27
7. "Hani" – 4:20
8. "Gambari" – 6:24
9. "(Njarka) Gambari" – 3:21
10. "Biennal" – 5:09
11. "Arsani" – 5:16
12. "Amadinin" – 7:08
13. "Seygalare" – 5:10
14. "Terei Kongo" – 6:08
15. "Radio Mali" – 2:43
16. "Njarka" – 1:02

== Personnel ==
- Ali Farka Touré - Vocals 2–12,14–15; Guitar 1–16; Percussion 7
- Bra Nabo - n'jarka violin 1,5,16
- Nassourou Sare - n'goni 3–4,8,11,13
- Fangha - n'jarka violin 5,9
- unknown - Chorus 6; Percussion 6, n'goni 6
