= From Kinshasa =

Studio album by Mbongwana Star
- Released: May 19, 2015
- Length: 47:30
- Label: World Circuit
- Producer: Doctor L; Michel Winter (exec.)

From Kinshasa is the debut studio album by Congolese band Mbongwana Star, released on May 19, 2015 on World Circuit.

== Background ==
The album's title was originally planned to be From Kinshasa to the Moon: "But World Circuit, with their English not being very strong, didn’t really catch that part! But a lot of the press are taking it on now, so I phoned [World Circuit] to say that they really shouldn’t have changed the title as it conveys the idea that your preconceptions about music from certain places might not be quite right. It’s from a city where you wouldn’t imagine that you’d find all these artists. The guy on the cover is a performance artist and there are tons of people in the city making incredible punky art. Kinshasa’s very good for that, there’s a big artistic subculture and people are instinctive in the way they work."

== Critical reception ==
Professional ratings
Aggregate scores
| Source | Rating |
|---|---|
| Metacritic | 88/100 |
Review scores
| Source | Rating |
| AllMusic | 4/5 stars |
| Clash | 8/10 |
| Drowned in Sound | 10/10 |
| The Guardian | 5/5 stars |
| The Irish Times | 4/5 stars |
| musicOMH | 4.5/5 stars |
| NME | 9/10 |
| Record Collector | 4/5 stars |
| Spin | 9/10 |
| Uncut | 8/10 |

From Kinshasa received widespread critical acclaim upon its release. It holds a weighted mean of 88 out of 100 from Metacritic, based on 13 critics, while on another aggregate site AnyDecentMusic?, it holds an 8.6 out of ten, also a weighted average.

Alexis Petridis of The Guardian gave a five-star review of From Kinshasa, describing the album as "like arriving in a bustling, unfamiliar city, a very long way from home: a gripping mix of excitement, apprehension and sensory overload." In his ten-out-of-ten review for Drowned in Sound, Tristan Bath called it "a really classic record for the ages", honoring it as a turning point for music released by African artists. Spin scored the album a nine out of ten, saying that it contributes new aspects in urban music.

Reviewing the album for AllMusic, Paul Simpson stated that, "Though the title is accurate, it undersells how expansive and otherworldly the group's music is; the atmospheric production and cosmic synth textures do make it seem like they're beaming their music into outer space." Concluding the review for Clash Magazine, Nick Annan wrote, "This collision of worlds adds a dystopian edge to the sonic battlefield, the lilting high-life guitars chiming amidst a juggernaut of deep bass, saturated percussion and ravaged european electronics. The enforced progression from Staff Benda Bilili to Mbongwana Star might've been a loss to some but this new incarnation of Ngambali and Nzonza's muse confidently steps outside the sometimes rather cozy confines of 'world' music and into the 21st Century." In the assessment of the album for Record Collector Paul Bowler wrote, "Mbongwana Star concoct an abrasive sound barrage of heavily distorted rumba grooves, here accompanied by post-punk guitar slashings. Channelled through Farrell’s electro blender on the likes of Nganshe, Masobele and the jaw-droppingly brilliant single Malukayi, it becomes a modernised, starkly original strain of dub that suggests fresh tributaries for a rapidly evolving music."

From Kinshasa appeared on of End-of-Year and End-of-Decade lists for a number of publications, including NPR Music's and Rolling Stone's favorite albums of the first half of 2015.

== Track list ==
| No. | Title | Length |
|---|---|---|
| 1. | "From Kinshasa to the moon" | 2:24 |
| 2. | "Shégué" | 5:17 |
| 3. | "Nganshé" | 6:13 |
| 4. | "Masobélé" | 3:51 |
| 5. | "Coco Blues" | 5:39 |
| 6. | "Malukayi" | 6:00 |
| 7. | "Suzanna" | 4:32 |
| 8. | "Kimpala Pala" | 4:28 |
| 9. | "Kala" | 4:04 |
| 10. | "1 million c'est quoi?" | 5:02 |
