= Mbongwana Star =

Congolese band

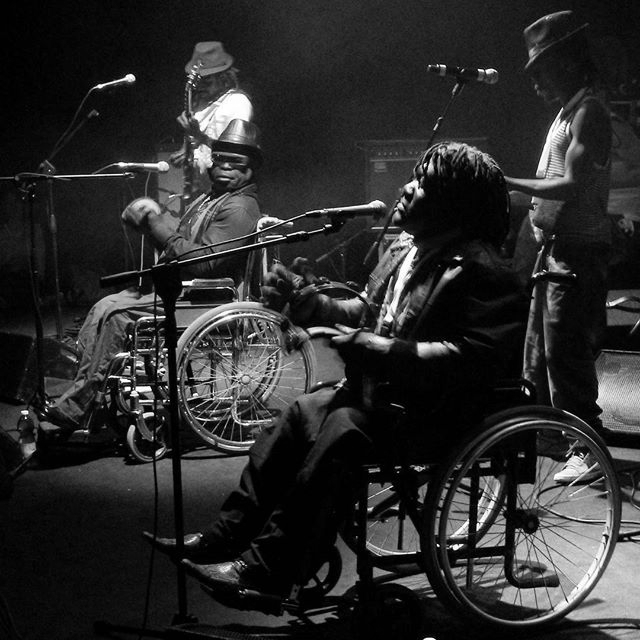
- Mbongwana Star performing in 2015

Background information
- Origin: Kinshasa, Democratic Republic of the Congo
- Years active: 2013–present
- Label: World Circuit
- Members: Coco Ngambali; Théo Ntsituvuidi; Liam Farrell (Doctor L)

Mbongwana Star is a band from Kinshasa, Congo. Of the seven members of the band, two of them (Coco Ngabali and Theo Nzonza) were among the founding members of Staff Benda Bilili.

The band is signed to the World Circuit label, on which they released their debut album, From Kinshasa, in 2015. The album received "universal acclaim" from critics, according to Metacritic.
