= In the Heart of the Moon =

Studio album by Ali Farka Touré and Toumani Diabaté
- Released: September 13, 2005
- Genre: African blues
- Length: 54:39
- Label: World Circuit
- Producer: Nick Gold

Ali Farka Touré chronology
| Niafunké (1999) | In the Heart of the Moon (2005) | Savane (2006) |

Professional ratings
Review scores
| Source | Rating |
|---|---|
| All About Jazz | 4.5/5 stars |
| AllMusic | 4.5/5 stars |
| Artistdirect | 4.5/5 stars |
| The Guardian | 3/5 stars |
| The Harvard Crimson | 4.5/5 stars |
| The Observer | 5/5 stars |

In the Heart of the Moon is a 2005 record by Malian musicians Ali Farka Touré on the guitar and providing vocals and Toumani Diabaté on the kora. The album was recorded in the "Toit de Bamako" conference room on the top floor of the Hotel Mandé overlooking the Niger River in Bamako, Mali. It is the first in a three-part series released on World Circuit Records entitled "The Hotel Mandé Sessions" followed by Savane and Boulevard de l'Independence. The album's title is derived from Touré's own more lengthy descriptive title for the recording session; "A very important meeting in the realm at the heart of the moon."

The album includes twelve tracks, based mostly on Songhai traditions of the north of Mali and the Bambara traditions of southern Mali and neighboring Guinea, harking back to the period immediately before independence. The album was recorded without rehearsals; both musicians claimed that the music flowed naturally and effortlessly, Touré being long acquainted with Diabaté's family and musical traditions. Despite their mutual admiration the musicians had previously only performed a total of three hours together over fifteen years. The Guardian described it as an "easygoing jam session album."

In 2009. It was awarded a gold certification from the Independent Music Companies Association which indicated sales of at least 100,000 copies throughout Europe.

== Track listing ==
| No. | Title | Arranged by | Length |
|---|---|---|---|
| 1. | "Debe" | Ali Farka Touré & Toumani Diabaté * | 4:55 |
| 2. | "Kala" | Toumani Diabaté * | 5:06 |
| 3. | "Mamadou Boutiquier" | Toumani Diabaté * | 5:04 |
| 4. | "Monsieur le Maire de Niafunké" | Toumani Diabaté | 3:58 |
| 5. | "Kaira" | Ali Farka Touré & Toumani Diabaté * | 6:24 |
| 6. | "Simbo" | Ali Farka Touré & Toumani Diabaté * | 4:00 |
| 7. | "Ai Ga Bani" | Ali Farka Touré | 4:34 |
| 8. | "Soumbou Ya Ya" | Ali Farka Touré & Toumani Diabaté * | 3:30 |
| 9. | "Naweye Toro" | Ali Farka Touré & Toumani Diabaté * | 4:23 |
| 10. | "Kadi Kadi" | Ali Farka Touré | 3:21 |
| 11. | "Gomni" | Ali Farka Touré | 4:17 |
| 12. | "Hawa Dolo" | Ali Farka Touré | 5:05 |

* Traditional arrangement

=== Monsieur le Maire de Niafunké ===
The fourth track on the album, Monsieur le Maire de Niafunké, was dedicated to Touré by Diabaté to commemorate the fact that, shortly before the album was recorded, Touré was made mayor of Niafunké. Additionally, Diabaté wanted to express his appreciation for Touré, from whom he had learned a great deal. The recording session gave Diabaté the opportunity to learn directly from Touré, who he described as "one of the great, great, great musicians" and "a prophet of the blues."

== Musicians ==
- Ali Farka Touré – guitar, singing (1, 7)
- Toumani Diabaté – kora
- Ry Cooder – Kawai piano (3, 7), Ripley guitar (12)
- Sekou Kanté – bass guitar (7, 8, 9)
- Orlando "Cachaíto" López – bass guitar (11, 12)
- Joachim Cooder – percussion (3, 5, 11)
- Olalekan Babalola – percussion (4, 11)
- James Thompson – shaker (5)

== International accolades ==
In 2006 the album was nominated for the Album of the Year Award in the BBC Radio 3 Awards for World Music but lost out to another Malian duo (Amadou and Mariam, with Dimanche à Bamako). In February of the same year the album won the Best Traditional World Album at the 48th Annual Grammy Awards. Diabaté was present at the ceremony to accept the award for both musicians. Farka was unable to personally accept the award and he would die before the award could be brought to him by the album's producer, Nick Gold.
