= Mali Music (album) =

Studio album by Damon Albarn, Afel Bocoum, Toumani Diabaté & Friends
- Released: 15 April 2002
- Recorded: 2001–2002
- Genre: Worldbeat
- Length: 57:35
- Label: Honest Jon's/EMI
- Producer: Simon Burwell

Damon Albarn chronology
G-Sides (2001)	Mali Music (2002)	Laika Come Home (2002)

Professional ratings
Review scores
Source	Rating
AllMusic	4/5 stars

Mali Music is a 2002 album by musician Damon Albarn in collaboration with Malian musicians Afel Bocoum, Toumani Diabaté & Friends, and also featuring a cameo from Ko Kan Ko Sata. It was recorded in Mali, during a trip Albarn made to support Oxfam in 2000.

== Track listing ==
1. Spoons
2. Bamako City
3. Le Relax
4. Nabintou Diakité (live recording)
5. Makelekele
6. The Djembe
7. Tennessee Hotel
8. Niger
9. 4AM at Toumani's
10. Institut National Des Arts
11. Kela Village
12. Griot Village
13. Le Hogon
14. Sunset Coming On
15. Ko Kan Ko Sata Doumbia on River
16. Les Escrocs
