= Grammy Award for Best Traditional World Music Album =

Grammy award

- Awarded for: quality traditional world music albums
- Country: United States
- Presented by: National Academy of Recording Arts and Sciences
- First award: 2004
- Final award: 2011
- Website: grammy.com

The Grammy Award for Best Traditional World Music Album was an honor presented to recording artists between 2004 and 2011 for quality traditional world music albums. The Grammy Awards, an annual ceremony that was established in 1958 and originally called the Gramophone Awards, are presented by the National Academy of Recording Arts and Sciences of the United States to "honor artistic achievement, technical proficiency and overall excellence in the recording industry, without regard to album sales or chart position".

The Grammy Award for Best World Music Album was first presented at the 34th Grammy Awards in 1992. The category remained unchanged until 2004, when it was split into separate awards for Best Traditional World Music Album and Best Contemporary World Music Album. The first award for Best Traditional World Music Album was presented to the Sherab Ling Monastery at the 46th Grammy Awards for the album Sacred Tibetan Chant. In 2011, a major overhaul of the Grammy categories resulted in the merge of the two awards to a single Best World Music Album category beginning in 2012.

== Recipients ==
Year^{[I]}	Performing artist(s)	Nationality	Work	Nominees	Ref.
2004	Jon Mark/Monks of Sherab Ling Monastery	New Zealand	Sacred Tibetan Chant	Ecos de Borinquen – Jibaro Hasta El Hueso: Mountain Music of Puerto Rico; Ghazal – The Rain; Grupo de Capoeira Angola Pelourinho – Capoeira Angola 2: Brincando Na Roda, Kassé Mady Diabaté – Kassi Kasse; Masters of Persian Music – Without You	
2005	Ladysmith Black Mambazo	South Africa	Raise Your Spirit Higher	El Grupo Cimarron – Si, Soy Llanero: Joropo Music from the Orinoco Plains of Colombia; Sandra Luna – Tango Varon; Perú Negro – Jolgorio; Various artists – Abayudaya: Music from the Jewish People of Uganda	
2006	Ali Farka Touré and Toumani Diabaté	Mali	In the Heart of the Moon	Mamadou Diabaté – Behmanka; Los Pleneros de la 21 – Para Todos Ustedes; Masters of Persian Music – Faryad; Lama Tashi – Tibetan Master Chants	
2007	Soweto Gospel Choir	South Africa	Blessed	Academy of Maqâm – Music of Central Asia, Vol. 2: Invisible Face of the Beloved: Classical Music of the Tajiks and Uzbeks; Hossein Alizadeh and Djivan Gasparyan – Endless Vision; Andrea Hoag, Loretta Kelley and Charlie Pilzer – Hambo in the Snow; Aashish Khan, Zakir Hussain – Golden Strings of the Sarode	
2008	Soweto Gospel Choir	South Africa	African Spirit	Rahim AlHaj with Souhail Kaspar – When The Soul Is Settled: Music of Iraq; Cheick Hamala Diabaté and Bob Carlin – From Mali to America; Konono Nº1 – Live at Couleur Café; Various artists – Singing for Life: Songs of Hope, Healing, and HIV/AIDS in Uganda	
2009	Ladysmith Black Mambazo	South Africa	Ilembe: Honoring Shaka Zulu	Debashish Bhattacharya – Calcutta Chronicles: Indian Slide Guitar Odyssey; Toumani Diabaté – The Mandé Variations; Lakshmi Shankar – Dancing In The Light	
2010	Mamadou Diabate	Mali	Douga Mansa	Rahim Alhaj and Amjad Ali Khan – Ancient Sounds; Liz Carroll & John Doyle – Double Play; John Santos y El Coro Folklórico Kindembo – La Guerra No; Ten Drum Art Percussion Group – Drum Music Land	
2011	Ali Farka Touré and Toumani Diabaté	Mali	Ali and Toumani	Gyuto Monks of Tibet – Pure Sounds; Bassekou Kouyate & Ngoni Ba – I Speak Fula; Soweto Gospel Choir – Grace; Vayo – Tango Universal	
