= Abdoulaye Diabaté (singer) =

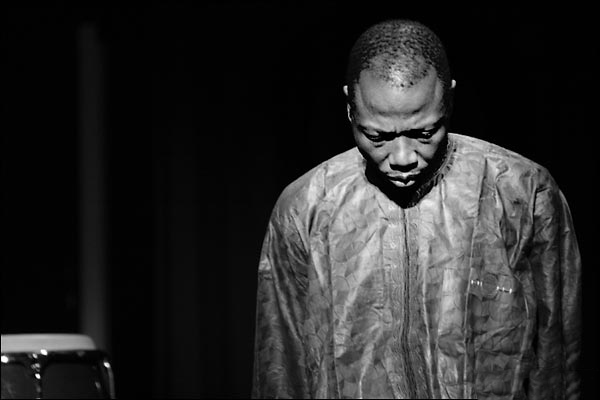
Abdoulaye Diabaté

Abdoulaye Diabaté is a singer and guitarist who was born to a griot family in Kela, Mali in 1956. He has at least twenty years of experience in contemporary and popular music.

== Life ==
Abdoulaye Diabaté was raised in the Manding tradition to a djali family (traditional musicians and story tellers). His brother Kassé Mady Diabaté has achieved worldwide fame and his sister Mama Diabate is a great star in Guinea. He is a nephew of a notable Malian griot Siramori Diabaté. At age 18, having developed into a formidable singer and guitarist he left his village. He joined Tenetemba Jazz in Bamako, the capital of Mali. In 1975, he moved to Abidjan in Ivory Coast where he formed his own band called Super Mande. Super Mande became one of the foremost ensembles in the capital performing all over the country. At times, some now most famous West African stars such as Salif Keita, Mory Kante and Ousmane Kouyate joined the group for performances. The career of Super Mande culminated with the release of their album Wahabiadashi which was eventually banned from airplay because the title track criticized hypocritical Marabouts (religious leaders). In the early nineties, Diabate was recruited as a star singer in the world-renowned "Ballet Koteba" led by Souleymane Koly to replace Sekou Camara "Cobra" after his death; and also as rhythm-guitarist with the "Go de Koteba" the world-famous women group. He toured the world with these ensemble for several years. In 1996, he relocated in New York City. He has since taken part in many cultural events as leader of the re-formed Super Mande group and with many collaborations with artists such as jazzman Don Byron, Peter Apfelbaum, Sean Noonan, and the groups Source and Fula Flute Ensemble.

In 2009, he released the album "SARA" on Completely Nuts records which features eight original compositions performed in a traditional style.

Diabaté's son is a rapper professionally known as Smooky MarGielaa.

== Religious interest ==
Abdoulaye Diabate is a Muslim. Any reference to an involvement with the Raelian movement is erroneous. The name "Abdoulaye Diabate" is relatively common in West Africa.

== Discography ==
"Sara" (2009) By Abdoulaye Diabate

"Mansa America" (2008) By Fula Flute

"Stories to Tell" (2007) By Sean Noonan's Brewed by Noon

"Boxing Dreams" (2008) By Sean Noonan's Brewed by Noon

"Being Brewed by Noon" (2008) By Sean Noonan's Brewed by Noon

"Tonight's African Jazz Band" (2006) by Source w/ Abdoulaye Diabate

Haklima (2005)

1. Haklima
2. Sinikan
3. Nama
4. Wunafaki
5. Kobaragna
6. Fasoka
7. Mososroni
8. Djougouya
9. Babani
10. Iloyoro

"It is written" (2005) BY Peter Apfelbaum & the New York Hieroglyphics

"Manden Jyliya in New York City" (2002) Smithsonian Folkways compilation (contains several tracks by Super Manden)

"Wahabiadachi" by Super Mande
