= Trio Da Kali =

Malian musical group

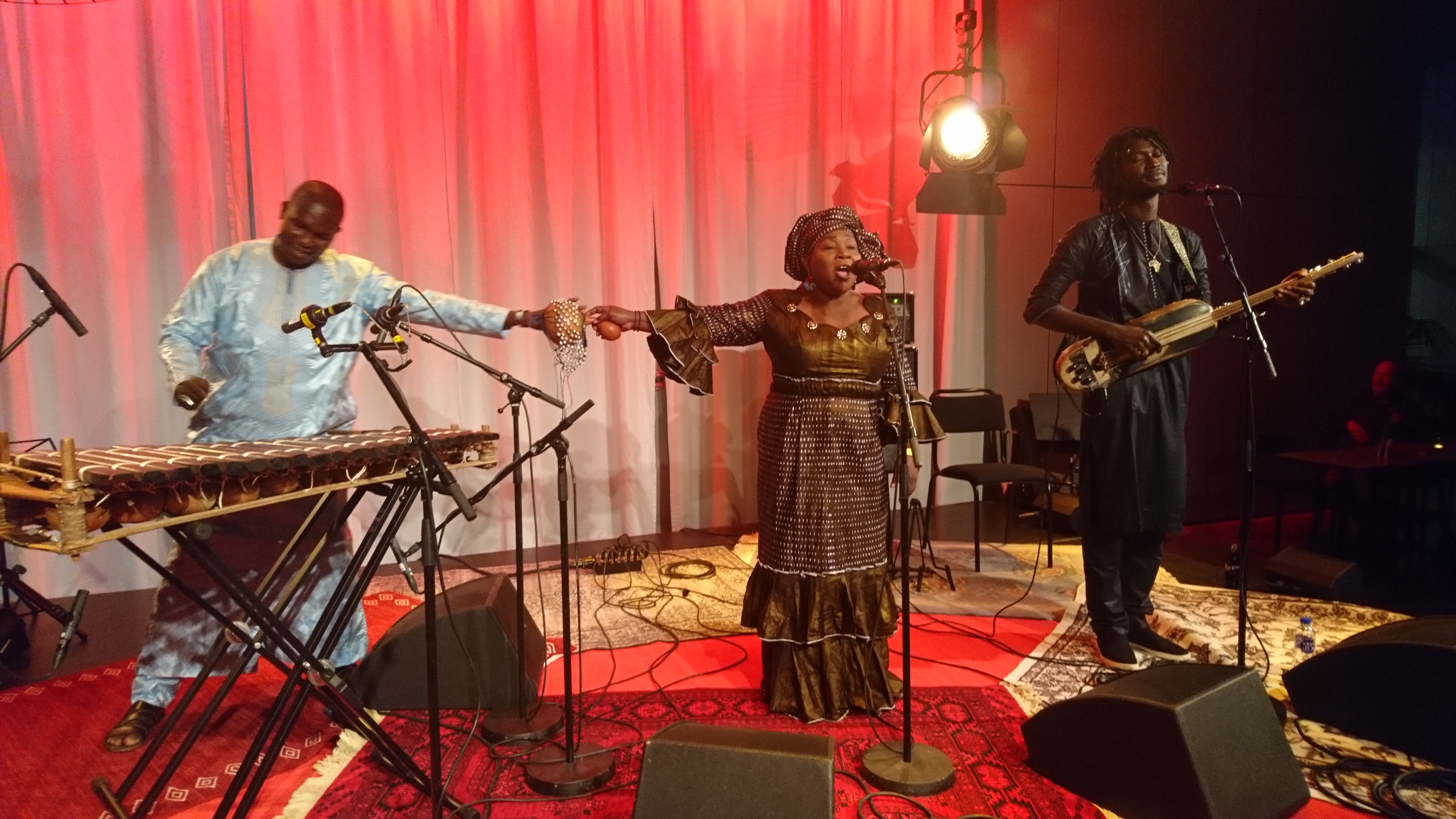
- Trio Da Kali performing in 2018

Background information
- Origin: Mali
- Genres: Folk, world music
- Label: World Circuit Records
- Members: Hawa Kassé Mady Diabaté; Mamadou Kouyaté; Lassana Diabaté

Trio Da Kali is a griot music group from Mali constituted of three members: Hawa Kassé Mady Diabaté (vocals), Lassana Diabaté (balafon) and Mamadou Kouyaté (ngoni). Hawa is the daughter of a griot Kassé Mady Diabaté. The latter is the son of the ngoni master Bassekou Kouyate.

Da Kali means 'to give a pledge' – in this case to their musical heritage, that of the Mande jelis (hereditary lineages) which dates back to the time of Sunjata Keita, founder of the great Mali empire in the early 13th century.

The trio collaborated with the American string quartet Kronos Quartet and they recorded an award-winning album, Ladilikan (2017, World Circuit). The album includes arrangements of two tracks by American gospel singer Mahalia Jackson, as well as important pieces from the Mande jeli repertoire such as "Sunjata" and the love song "Tita". The two groups toured together in many cities across the world. The song 'Demba by Tsha ft. Trio Da Kali is featured in the FIFA22 soundtrack.
