= Kennis Voor Het Leven =

- Directed by: Sander Francken
- Screenplay by: Joost Schrickx, Sander Francken
- Produced by: Sander Francken Film
- Starring: Afel Bocoum, Kolado Bocoum, Abba Bilancoro, Fatoumata Camara
- Cinematography: Melle van Essen
- Edited by: Gys Zevenbergen
- Music by: Afel Bocoum
- Release date: 2005
- Running time: 29 minutes
- Countries: Mali; Netherlands

Kennis Voor Het Leven (Knowledge for Life) is a 2005 Dutch and Malian film.

== Synopsis ==
What is the largest part of all knowledge? In order to answer this question a young scholar of a Koran school sets out on a seven-day journey of discovery through Djenné, a West African city of ancient beauty.

== Screenings ==
The movie was included in the 2005 African Film Festival of Cordoba. It was also included in the 2005 International Film Festival Rotterdam. Since 2010 the film is included in the feature film Bardsongs.
