= Ko Kan Ko Sata =

Kokanko Sata
- Origin: Mali
- Occupation: Instrumentalist
- Instrument: Kamelen n'goni

Kokanko Sata is a musician from southern Mali. She plays the kamale n'goni, a traditional eight-stringed lute, and is said to be the only woman who plays this instrument.

Her self-named album features her singing and playing the kamele n'goni, accompanied by balafon and flute. It has been released on Honest Jon's, a record label run by Damon Albarn.

Her work is also featured on Damon Albarn's 2002 album, Mali Music.
