= Siramori Diabaté =

Malian storyteller

- Born: c. 1933; Kela, Koulikoro Region, Mali
- Died: 1989
- Occupation: Storyteller
- Spouse: Nankoman Kouyaté

Siramori Diabaté (c. 1933 – 1989) was a Malian griotte, a storyteller. Her first name is sometimes given as Sira Mori and Siramory, while her last name is sometimes spelled Jabaté.

== Biography ==
Diabaté was born in the village of Kela, in the Koulikoro Region of Mali. The town is famous for the griots born there, and Diabaté was from a family notable for its talents. Her grandfather, Kelabalaba, was said to be the first member of his extended family to be the official reciter of the Sundiata Epic, while her father, Bintu'amma, was well known as a musician, especially for his prowess on the ngoni. Diabaté herself was part of a younger generation, which learned from its roots but which incorporated facets of modern urban life into its performances. She began to develop a regional reputation by the early 1940s, particularly for her song "Sara", about a young woman torn between the arranged marriage her parents desire and her own wish to marry for love.

She also recited the Sundiata Epic; her performances of this and other songs led to interest from French ethnomusicologists, and their recordings increased her popularity even further, to the point that she was better known than most male griots, even. The socialist Malian government presented her as a figure of cultural pride and regularly played her music on state radio. She continued to be visited by anthropologists and historians into the 1970s. Diabaté was greatly influential to the next generation of Malian musicians, such as Salif Keita and Rokia Traoré, and she worked with Western scholars such as Barbara Hoffman as well. She was once described as "knowing all the Mandé".

It was often rumored that Diabaté had used supernatural means to affect the quality of her voice. While singing, she sometimes accompanied herself on the guitar. Relatively few of her performances survived on disc, although a handful were recorded in 1974 and others several months before her death. These are still available on compact disc. She was married to balafon player Nankoman Kouyaté; several of their children have also become musicians, and two of her nephews are singers, Kassé Mady Diabaté and Abdoulaye Diabaté.

Musicologist Jan Jansen, who worked with Diabaté on research, claimed that he had taken his jamu, or ascribed patronymic, Sidiki Kouyaté, from the name of her husband, due to the closeness of their association.
