= Livingston Recording Studios =

Recording studio in London, England

Coordinates: 51.5941°N 0.1116°W

Livingston Recording Studios is a recording studio in North London.

The studios were started by Ray Kinsey, a film director from North London, who branched out into recording talking books for the blind. The first Livingston Studio designed for recording music was set up in Barnet UK during 1963 where work on talking books continued alongside the recording of folk music. Kinsey's son, Nick Kinsey, joined the company in 1966. Nick Kinsey started to develop the studios continuing with the recording of folk music and branching out into pop music. He recorded artists such as Sweeney's Men, Pentangle, Iain Matthews and Russ Ballard. Nick Kinsey bought the studio from Fred Livingston-Hogg an Oxford-based business man who had been involved with the Livingston Hire Group, with the help of Alan Tomkins and Michael Smee, and rebuilt it.

Livingston Studios were purchased by Miloco Studios in 2012, who continue to run the studio.

== History ==
During 1980, Nick Kinsey decided to expand the business and move to an old Church hall in Wood Green and transformed it into a hi-tech studio. In 1985, a second studio was added and Jerry and Mary Boys joined the company. By 1987 they had opened two more studios in Guillemot Place North London.

In 1993, Livingston succumbed to the nationwide recession in UK and the Guillemot studios were closed down. The Brook Road studios were acquired by Jerry Boys and Dave Margereson who owned the music management company Mismanagement and the new company 'Livingston Recording Studios Ltd' was set up.

Nick Gold, producer and owner of the World circuit record label, met Jerry Boys after working together on an album with Oumou Sangaré and they started to work together with the Buena Vista Social Club. The Buena Vista Social Club's eponymous multi million selling first album was recorded at Egrem studios, Havana and mixed by Boys and Gold at Livingston Studios. They released it on their World Circuit label in 1997.

Björk's debut album Debut (1993) was recorded and mixed at Livingston Studios by producer Marius De Vries. It sold over 2.5m copies worldwide.

In 2001, Gold bought the company from Boys which enabled most of World Circuit's artists to be record and mix their music at Livingston Studios.

Gold sold Livingston to global recording studio directory Miloco Studios in 2012, who renovated the studio in October of that year and re-launched the studio alongside producer Mike Crossey. Since then artists such as The 1975, Arctic Monkeys, Låpsley, Gin Wigmore, Hozier and Ben Howard have all worked on projects at Livingston Studios with Mike Crossey

In 2015, Miloco Studios renovated Studio 2, installing Augspurger Monitors and a Custom Series 75 console powered by Neve. Livingston Studio 1 was also renovated and upgraded with new equipment, including a pair of Augspurger Duo-12 monitors.

== Artists who have used Livingston Studios ==
A

- A&G Records
- Adam Seymour
- Adrian Hall
- Adrian Sherwood
- Afro Cuban All Stars
- Alex Wilson
- Ali Farka Toure
- Andy Scart
- Andy Thornton
- Ash
- Asian Dub Foundation
- Athena
- Atlantic*

B

- Barb Jungr
- Basement
- Balenescu Quartet
- Bellowhead
- Bernard Butler
- Beth Orton
- Betty Steeles
- Big Linda
- Björk
- Blondelle
- Blowup Records
- Bobby Kray
- Box of Frogs
- Brass Monkey
- Buena Vista Social Club
- Bush*

C

- Cameron McVey
- Candid Records
- Calum Malcolm
- The Cat Empire
- CEC Management
- Chris Kimsey
- Chris Sheldon*

D

- Danny Shogger
- The Datsuns
- Damien Saez
- Dave Eringa
- Dave Evans
- David Ward Films
- Dennis Bovell
- Del Amitri
- Dimi Mint Abba
- Dimitri*

E

- The Ebony Tower
- Elova
- The Enemy
- Enjoy Destroy
- Erol Alkan
- Everything but the Girl
- Eyes Wide Open*

F

- Feeder
- The Fierce and the Dead
- The Friendly
- Fires
- Future Cut*

G

- Gil Norton
- Graham Dominy
- Greg Haver
- Sean Genocky
- Gyroscope

H

- Hello
- Hamish Imlach
- Hate Gallery
- Hogg*

I

- Ian Broudie
- Iain Matthews
- Ian Shaw
- Ibrahim Ferrer
- Imelda May
- Island
- Issie Barrett*

J

- Jamie Cullum
- Jazz Jamaica
- Jerry Boys
- Jimmy Roberts
- Joe Boyd
- Joe Lean & The Jing Jang
- Joe Stilgoe
- John Cornfield
- John Gallen
- John Leckie
- John Martyn
- John Renbourn
- Johnny Panic*
- Jong
- Justin Hayward

K

- KK
- Kaitee Page
- Ken Rose
- Kasai Masai
- Kate Rusby*

L

- Labi Siffre
- Låpsley
- The Libertines
- Lou Rhodes
- Luan Parle
- Luis Jardin
- Lunic*

M

- Manic Street Preachers
- Mansun
- Marius De Vries
- Mark Morgan
- Mark Rankin
- Matt Stevens
- Melanie C
- Mercury
- Michael Kiwanuka
- Mike Neilson
- Minus 1
- The Mission
- Muse*

N

- Nathan Haines
- Nick Abbott
- Nick Gold
- Nizlopi
- Norman Cook*

O

- The Opera Babes
- Orchestra Baobab
- Oumou Sangaré
- Owen Morris*

P

- Paul Borg
- Pedro Ferreira
- Pee Wee Ellis
- Peter Borthwick
- Placebo
- Plan B
- Polydor
- Portico Quartet
- Primal Scream*

R

- Emre Ramazanoglu
- Rafe McKenna
- The Rakes
- The Rank Deluxxe
- Reuben
- R.E.M.
- Richard Norris
- Robert Kirby
- Ronan Keating
- Rough Trade
- Roy Merchant
- Russ Ballard
- Ry Cooder*

S

- Saxon (band)
- George Shilling
- Shakira
- Siskin
- The Smiths
- Sports Team
- Sonny
- Spike Drake
- Steve Lironi
- Steve Orchard
- Steve Osbourne
- Sweeney's Men
- Symmetric Orchestra*

T

- Terry Thomas
- Tom Leader
- Tom McRae
- Brian Tench
- Tom Richards
- Tony Platt
- TrailVega 4*
- Twenty One Pilots

U

- Universal *

V

- Voces 8*

W

- West One Music
- Wet Wet Wet
- The Winter Kids
- The Waterboys*
- Wolf Alice

X

- Xmal Deutschland

Y

- Youssou N'Dour
