= Niafunké (album) =

Studio album by Ali Farka Touré
- Released: 22 June 1999
- Venues: Niafunké, Mali
- Length: 52:24
- Label: World Circuit Music (PRS)
- Producer: Nick Gold Audio Engineer = Jerry Boys

Ali Farka Touré chronology
Radio Mali (1996)	Niafunké (1999)	Red&Green (2004)

Professional ratings
Review scores
Source	Rating
AllMusic	4/5 stars
Robert Christgau	A−

Niafunké is an album by Ali Farka Touré, released in 1999. The title reflects the name of the village in Mali where it was recorded. It is largely a traditional album concerning Mali.

== History ==
Touré discusses his motivation for creating the album and how the music might relate to its audience.

This record is more real, more authentic. It was recorded in the place where the music belongs - deep Mali. We were in the middle of the landscape which inspired the music and that in turn inspired myself and the musicians. My music is about where I come from and our way of life and it is full of important messages for Africans. In the West perhaps this music is just entertainment and I don't expect people to understand. But I hope some might take the time to listen and learn.

— Ali Farka Touré,

Niafunké marks the first of a series of albums he recorded towards the end of his career in his home town. The album was released around the same time he retired to his farm in a remote region of Mali.

== Track list ==
No.	Title	Vocals	Length
1.	"Ali's Here"	Hammer Sankare	3:13
2.	"Allah Uya"	Hammer Sankare, Djeneba Doukoure, Fatoumata Traore, Hamidou Sare	4:28
3.	"Mali Dje"	Hammer Sankare, Djeneba Doukoure, Fatoumata Traore, Hamidou Sare	5:37
4.	"Saukare"	Djeneba Doukoure, Fatoumata Traore, Hamidou Sare	2:47
5.	"Hilly Yoro"	Afel Bocoum, Hammer Sankare, Oumar Toure	3:36
6.	"Tulumba"	Hammer Sankare	5:20
7.	"Instrumental"		4:10
8.	"ASCO"	Oumar Toure	5:45
9.	"Jangali Famata"	Ali Farka Touré, Affel Bocoum, Oumar Toure	3:20
10.	"Howkouna"	Ali Farka Touré, Hammer Sankare, Affel Bocoum, Oumar Toure	5:55
11.	"Cousins"	Hammer Sankare, Djeneba Doukoure, Fatoumata Traore, Hamidou Sare	4:14
12.	"Pieter Botha"	Oumar Toure	3:20
