= Songhai (musical collaboration) =

World music collaboration

Songhai was a world music collaboration between the Spanish flamenco group Ketama, Malian kora player Toumani Diabaté, and English bass player Danny Thompson. They released two albums, Songhai (1988) and Songhai 2 (1994), both co-produced by Joe Boyd.

In October 1987, Ketama played five concerts in London, where they met Toumani Diabaté and musicologist and record producer Lucy Durán, who encouraged them to work together. After the group jammed with Diabaté, they performed together at a London club and agreed to record an album for Boyd's Hannibal label. The album was recorded in Madrid in April 1988, with a core line-up consisting of Diabaté, the four members of Ketama – Juan Carmona (guitar), José Soto (vocals, guitar), Antonio Carmona (percussion, vocals), and José Miguel Carmona (percussion, vocals) – and Danny Thompson (bass), with additional backing vocals by Diaw Kouyate and Djanka Diabate of Mory Kanté's band.

The album was well received as a successful fusion of different but related styles of music, but a follow-up was delayed for six years. The core line-up which reunited for Songhai 2 in 1994 was essentially the same as for the first album, although by that time Soto was working as a solo artist rather than as a member of Ketama, and Thompson only featured on three of the tracks. The album also featured bassist Javier Colina, and Malian musicians Kassemady (vocals), Kélétigui Diabaté (balafon), and Basekou Kouyate (ngoni).

== Discography ==
Albums

- Songhai (1988, Nuevos Medios)
- Songhai 2 (1994, Nuevos Medios)

Contributing artist

- The Rough Guide to Flamenco (1997, World Music Network)
