= Greenlights (book) =

2020 book by Matthew McConaughey

- First edition cover and dust jacket
- Author: Matthew McConaughey
- Audio read by: Matthew McConaughey
- Cover artist: Miller Mobley (photo); Christopher Brand (design); Michael Morris (design)
- Language: English
- Genre: Memoir; philosophy; poetry
- Publisher: Crown
- Publication date: October 20, 2020
- Publication place: United States
- Media type: Print (hardcover), e-book, audio
- Pages: 304
- ISBN: 978-0-593-13913-4 (hardcover)
- OCLC: 1152442722
- Dewey Decimal: 791.4302/8092 B
- LC Class: PN2287.M54545 A3 2020
- Website: greenlights.com

Greenlights is a 2020 book by American actor Matthew McConaughey. It was published on October 20, 2020, by the Crown imprint of Crown Publishing Group.

== Background ==
McConaughey exiled himself in the desert without electricity for fifty-two days while writing the book. Greenlights originated from diaries and journals McConaughey began writing when he was fourteen years old. McConaughey described the book as a collection of "stories, prayers, poems, people and places and a whole bunch of bumper stickers." The book includes stories and insights from McConaughey's life in chronological order. It has been described as a memoir but McConaughey has called it an "approach book".

== Reception ==
The book was a major best-seller, debuting at number one on The New York Times nonfiction best-seller list for the week ending October 24, 2020. As of February 2022, the book has spent 55 weeks on the list.

Mark Athitakis of The Washington Post called McConaughey's poetry "cringeworthy" and criticized his wisdom for being unrelatable, calling the book "stuffed with vaporous, circular proverbs for would-be McConaugheys." In their review, The Times of India wrote, "The writing is conversational and easy to read, though this is one book whose audiobook form is worth listening to. The actor/author reads it himself, with the correct inflections and even does voices. It's truly entertaining." In an interview with McConaughey, Canadian psychologist Jordan Peterson said that the book was "a collection of great stories".
