= Ali and Toumani =

Studio album by Ali Farka Touré and Toumani Diabaté
- Released: February 23, 2010
- Recorded: Livingston Studios, London, 24–26 June 2005
- Genre: African blues
- Length: 49:41
- Label: World Circuit
- Producer: Nick Gold

Ali and Toumani is a 2010 record by Malian musicians Ali Farka Touré on the guitar and providing vocals and Toumani Diabaté on the kora. It is the second album featuring the two musicians, being a follow up to their 2005 album In the Heart of the Moon. Recorded in 2005 in London prior to concert dates in Europe following the release of In the Heart of the Moon, the album was released four years after Touré's death in 2006.

Ali and Toumani features some older songs from Touré's repertoire: "Sabu Yerkoy", which celebrates Mali's independence, dates from the 1960s, and "Sina Mory" is the first song Touré ever heard on guitar in 1956. According to Diabaté, "[t]he album was going to be a summing up of all the albums that Ali had done in the past...It was the very last album he made."

== Critical reception ==
Professional ratings
Aggregate scores
Source	Rating
Metacritic	89/100
Review scores
Source	Rating
All About Jazz	4/5 stars
AllMusic	4/5 stars
The Financial Times	5/5 stars
The Guardian	5/5 stars
The Los Angeles Times	3.5/4 stars
Mojo	4/5 stars
MusicOMH	4.5/5 stars
Pitchfork	8.3/10
Q	4/5 stars
The Telegraph	5/5 stars

In a 2010 review for Pitchfork, Joe Tangari said that the sessions for the album were recorded with "uncompomising intimacy" and that the album, along with In the Heart of the Moon, were "uncommonly beautiful". Tangari concludes, "It is not challenging music. Anyone can approach it easily, and it is the perfect initiation to Touré's talents for listeners who haven't yet heard him."

== Track listing ==
No.	Title	Length
1.	"Ruby"	5:50
2.	"Sabu Yerkoy"	4:05
3.	"Bé Mankan"	5:07
4.	"Doudou"	4:42
5.	"Warbé"	4:47
6.	"Samba Geladio"	3:13
7.	"Sina Mory"	4:23
8.	"56"	6:53
9.	"Fantasy"	2:15
10.	"Machengoidi"	5:01
11.	"Kala Djula"	3:25

== Musicians ==
- Ali Farka Touré – guitar (tracks 1–11)
- Toumani Diabate – kora (tracks 1–11)
- Orlando "Cachaíto" López – bass (tracks 1,2,5,6,11)
- Vieux Farka Touré – congas (tracks 2,5,11) backing vocals (track 2)
- Souleye Kané – backing vocals (track 2)
- Ali Magassa – backing vocals (track 2)
- Tim Keiper – percussion (track 5,11)

== Professional reviews ==
- Kitty Empire (February 14, 2010). "Ali Farka Touré and Toumani Diabaté: Ali and Toumani". Guardian Observer. Guardian News and Media.
