= Songhai (album) =

Studio album by Ketama, Toumani Diabaté, and Danny Thompson
- Released: 1988
- Genre: Flamenco, world music
- Label: Nuevos Medios
- Producer: Joe Boyd and Mario Pacheco

Ketama, Toumani Diabaté, and Danny Thompson chronology
Songhai (1988)	Songhai 2 (1994)

Professional ratings
Review scores
Source	Rating
AllMusic	5/5 stars
The Encyclopedia of Popular Music	4/5 stars
MusicHound World	4.5/5 stars

Songhai is a fusion flamenco album by Spanish band Ketama, working in collaboration with Malian kora player Toumani Diabaté, British double bassist Danny Thompson, and other musicians.

== Track listing ==
Side A

1. "Jarabi" – (Traditional, arranged by Toumani Diabaté) – 3:40
2. "Mani Mani Kuru" – (Toumani Diabaté) – 5:29
3. "Caramelo" – (Juan Carmona) – 4:18
4. "A Toumani" – (José Soto) – 3:28

Side B

5. "Vente pa Madrid" – (Antonio Carmona, José Miguel Carmona) – 4:34
6. "Africa" – (Toumani Diabaté) – 5:23
7. "A mi tía Marina" – (José Miguel Carmona) – 3:36
8. "Ne Ne Koitaa" – (Traditional, arranged by Toumani Diabaté) – 3:17

== Personnel ==
- Toumani Diabaté – Kora, vocals
- Ketama:
  - José Soto – vocals, guitar
  - Juan Carmona – guitar, handclaps; guitar solo (track 3)
  - Antonio Carmona – percussion, guitar; vocals (track 5)
  - José Miguel Carmona – guitar, emulator; vocals (track 5)
- Danny Thompson – double bass
- Diaw Kouyate – vocals (tracks 2, 6)
- Djanka Diabaté – vocals (tracks 2, 6)
- Marcelo Carlos Fuentes – electric bass (tracks 5, 7)
- José Luis Carmona – backing vocals (track 5)
- Guillermo – backing vocals (track 5)

== See also ==
- Songhai (musical collaboration)
