= Nick Gold =

British record producer and music executive

- Education: University of Sussex
- Occupations: Record producer; Audio engineer; Music executive
- Years active: 1996–present
- Label: World Circuit
- Parent(s): Jack Gold and Denyse Alexander

Nick Gold is a British record producer, multi-instrumentalist and music executive. He is the former CEO of World Circuit Records and the organiser of Buena Vista Social Club, a Cuban musical ensemble which he established in 1996. Gold is a two-time Grammy Award winner. In 2006, The New York Times described him as a "Musical Matchmaker".

== Biography ==
Gold's parents were TV and film director Jack Gold and actress Denyse Alexander. Gold graduated from the University of Sussex with a degree in African history. He began his career by working in Mole Jazz record store in King's Cross, London, while also volunteering for the charity Community Music, where he learned about Arts Worldwide, run by Anne Hunt and Mary Farquharson, which organised British concerts tours for musicians from Latin America and Africa. The organisation went on to create a record company to produce recordings to cater for the demand from audiences. The organization hired Gold to run the label and he was tasked with finding a recording studio and producer for Kenyan musical group Shiratti Jazz. According to The New York Times, this was Gold's first visit to a recording studio and his first glimpse of a mixing console.

In the early 1990s, Gold bought the organization and took over. Gold invited American musician Ry Cooder and Malian guitarist Ali Farka Touré to London, where they played together and decided to collaborate in the future. In 1996, Gold planned to fly two Malian musicians to Cuba to record with Ry Cooder and a group of Cuban musicians, as an exploration of Afro-Cuban culture. However, the Malian musicians could not reach Cuba because they were denied the necessary visas. Gold went on to gather Cuban musicians from different performing backgrounds to create the Buena Vista Social Club.

Gold produced the 1984 Grammy award-winning album Cherie by Ali Farka Touré, and co-produced the 1996 studio album Buena Vista Social Club. Gold is also noted for his production, engineering and coordination credits on Toumani Diabaté, London Symphony Orchestra, Afro-Cuban All Stars, Afel Bocoum, Tony Allen, Orchestra Baobab, Djeli Moussa Diawara, Fatoumata Diawara, Cheikh Lô, Oumou Sangaré and Hugh Masekela.

In 2018, Gold sold World Circuit Records to the Bertelsmann Music Group (BMG). According to Music Week, Gold would continue to work with BMG to develop the World Circuit catalogue and new projects.
