= African Blues (Ali Farka Touré album) =

Studio album by Ali Farka Touré
- Released: 1990
- Recorded: late 80s
- Genre: Songhay music, acoustic blues
- Length: 44:52
- Label: Shanachie
- Producer: Ali Farka Touré

Ali Farka Touré chronology
| Ali Farka Touré (1988) | African Blues (1990) | The River (1991) |

African Blues is an album by the Malian musician Ali Farka Touré, released in 1990. It was originally released by French label Sonodisc.

== Critical reception ==
Professional ratings
Review scores
| Source | Rating |
|---|---|
| AllMusic | 4/5 stars |
| Chicago Tribune | 3.5/4 stars |

Trouser Press wrote: "The blunt, lonesome vocals echo the plainspoken manner of Delta storytellers, but the forms are less familiar: many of the selections are built on droning single chords that become enchanting through repetition." The Chicago Tribune stated that "Toure's sound and style are testaments to his love for the Delta bluesmen and the influences he shares with them: the ability to weave a good story with emotional guitar accompaniment."

== Track listing ==
1. "Sidy Gouro" – 3:45
2. "Okatagouna" – 4:22
3. "Devele Wague" – 5:59
4. "N'Timbara" – 3:58
5. "Zona" – 7:45
6. "Mbaudy" – 8:52
7. "Petenere" – 4:50
8. "L'Exode" – 5:21

== Personnel ==
- Ali Farka Touré (Vocals 1–8, Guitar 1–8)
- Hammer Sankare (Vocals 1–4, Calabash 1–4)
- Boubacar Hamadoun Farana (Griot 5–8)
- Ousmane Gadjaka (n'goni 5–8)
