= Njarka =

The njarka (Koyraboro Senni Songhai: nzarka) is a small fiddle made from a gourd, with one gut string, which is native to Mali. Ali Farka Touré was a notable njarka player.
