= African blues =

African music genre

- Stylistic origins: Music of Africa; Music of West Africa various blues styles
- Cultural origins: Africa blues styles
- Typical instruments: Ngoni, guitar, Kora, Calabash, Djembe, Balafon
- Derivative forms: Rock and roll, R&B, swing

African blues is a genre of popular music, primarily from West Africa. The term may also reference a putative journey undertaken by traditional African music from its homeland to the United States and back. Some scholars and ethnomusicologists have speculated that the origins of the blues can be traced to the musical traditions of Africa, as retained by African-Americans during and after slavery. Even though the blues is a key component of American popular music, its rural, African-American origins are largely undocumented, and its stylistic links with African instrumental traditions are somewhat tenuous. One musical influence that can be traced back to African sources is that of the plantation work songs with their call-and-response format, and more especially the relatively free-form field hollers of the later sharecroppers, which seem to have been directly responsible for the characteristic vocal style of the blues.

Albums such as African Blues by Ali Farka Toure have a noticeable African and American Blues influence. The death of Malian guitar legend Ali Farka Touré has inspired a new round of speculation about the roots of the blues in Africa. Touré famously argued that the beloved American genre was "nothing but African", a bold assertion. The question has received extensive scholarly attention in Gerhard Kubik's book Africa and the Blues, and in Paul Oliver's Savannah Syncopators: African Retentions in the Blues.

== Notable artists ==
- Ali Farka Toure
- Boubacar Traoré
- Ramon Goose
- Corey Harris
- Vieux Farka Toure
- Ry Cooder
- Taj Mahal
- Robert Plant
- Rokia Traore
- Baaba Maal
- Nuru Kane
- Justin Adams
