= Talking Timbuktu =

Studio album by Ali Farka Touré with Ry Cooder
- Released: March 29, 1994
- Recorded: Sep 1993
- Genre: Malian folk
- Length: 59:59
- Label: World Circuit
- Producer: Ry Cooder

Ali Farka Touré with Ry Cooder chronology
The Source (1993)	Talking Timbuktu (1994)	Radio Mali (1996)

Talking Timbuktu is the 1994 collaboration album between Malian guitarist Ali Farka Touré and American guitarist/producer Ry Cooder. The guitar riff from the song "Diaraby" was selected for the Geo-quiz segment of The World PRI-BBC radio program and was retained by popular demand when put to a vote by the listeners. In 2009, the album was awarded a gold certification from the Independent Music Companies Association which indicated sales of at least 100,000 copies throughout Europe.

== Reception ==
Professional ratings
Review scores
Source	Rating
AllMusic	3/5 stars
Music Week	3/5 stars

The album features in the book 1001 Albums You Must Hear Before You Die and received the Grammy Award for Best World Music Album of 1994.

== Track listing ==
1. "Bonde" (Peul) – 5:28
2. "Soukora" (Bambara) – 6:05
3. "Gomni" (Songhai) – 7:00
4. "Sega" (Peul) – 3:10
5. "Amandrai" (Tamasheck) – 9:22
6. "Lasidan" (Bambara) – 6:06
7. "Keito" (Songhai) – 5:42
8. "Banga" (Songhai) – 2:32
9. "Ai Du" (Songhai) – 7:09
10. "Diaraby" (Bambara) – 7:25

(Languages listed in parentheses after each title, as credited in the album liner notes)

== Certifications ==
Region	Certification	Certified units/sales
United States	—	238,000
