= Calabash (percussion) =

African percussion instrument

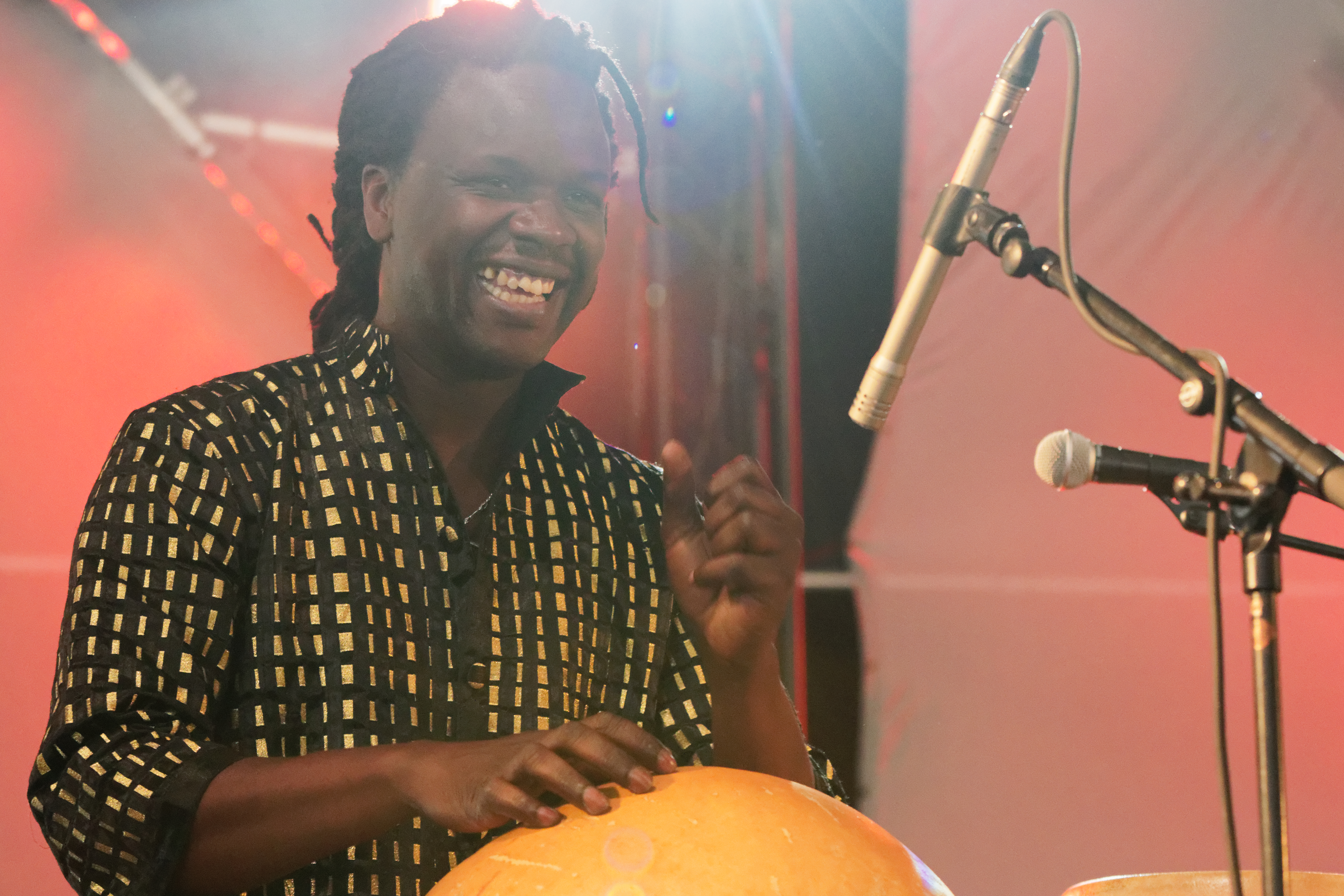
- Percussionist (Mamadou Sarr) playing the Calabash with the bare hand technique

Percussion instrument
- Classification: percussion
- Hornbostel–Sachs classification: 111.3

In African music, the calabash is a percussion instrument of the family of idiophones consisting of a half of a large calabash gourd, which is struck with the palms, fingers, wrist or objects to produce a variety of percussive sounds.

In Tuareg music, the askalabo is a calabash "partly submerged in water, drummed to mimic camels' hooves".

The calabash can also be used as a sound board: a finger piano (a flat board with a bridge on which prongs are fastened, that are then played with the fingers) can use a calabash for that purpose, and the gongoma is a similar instrument, using saw blades on a bridge affixed over the calabash—the blades are plucked with the fingers, while the player taps the calabash with their other hand.

A calabash can also be used as a resonator, in the case of the umakhweyane, a middle-braced calabash bow.

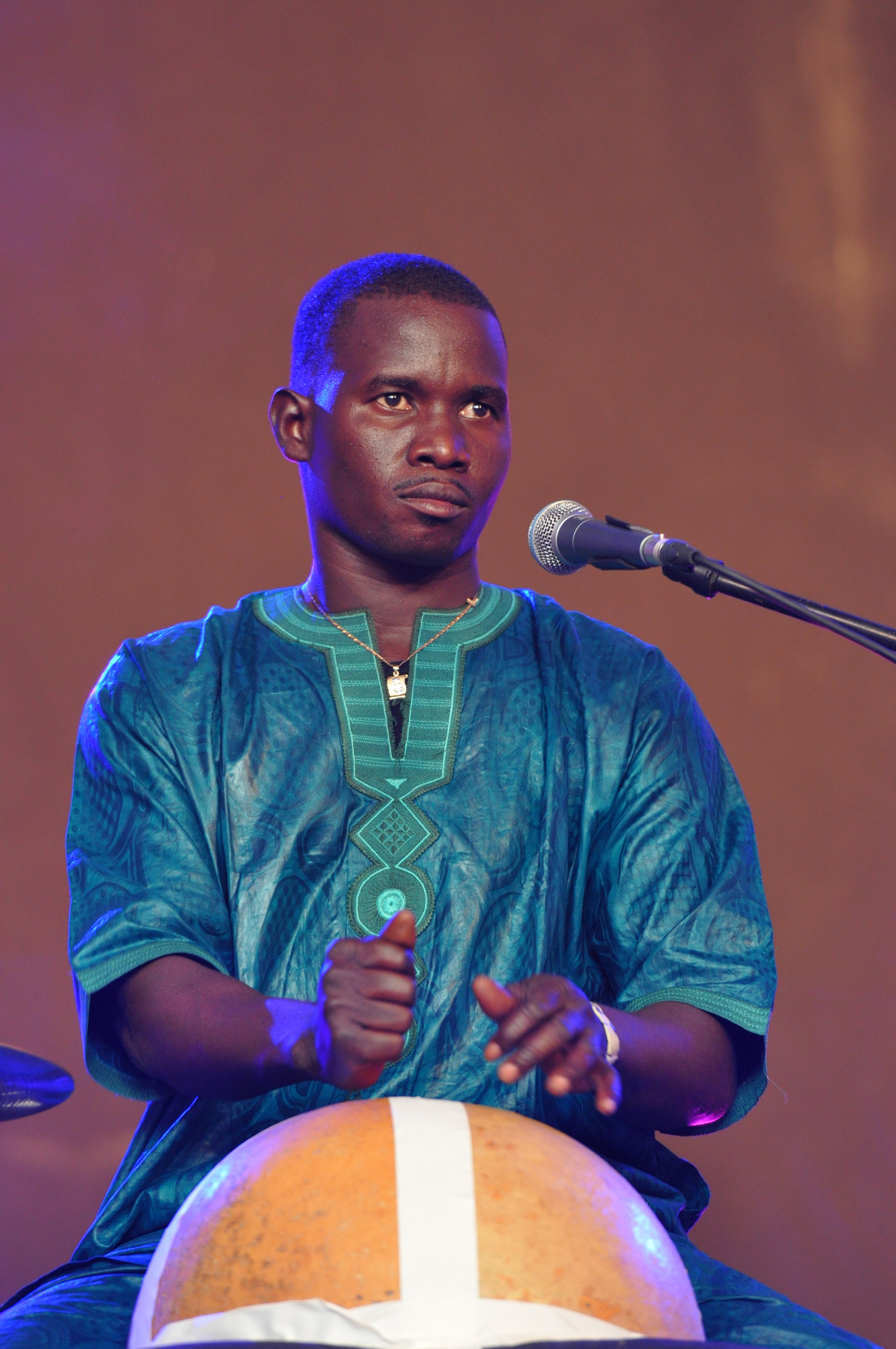
Percussionists playing Calabash with both fists and fingers
