= Toumani Diabaté =

Malian musician (1965–2024)

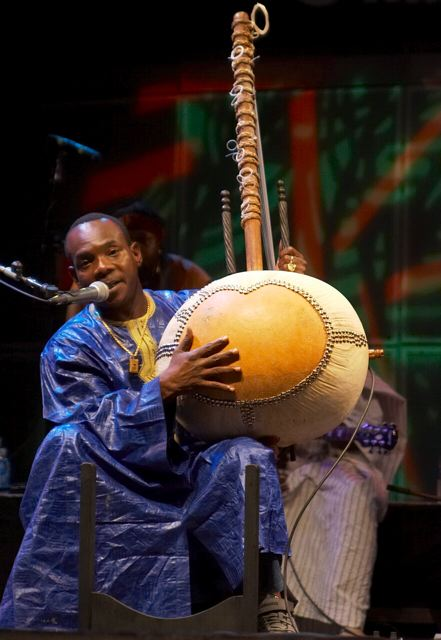
- Diabaté and his kora in 2007

Background information
- Born: 10 August 1965; Bamako, Mali
- Origin: Gallé, Mali
- Died: 19 July 2024 (aged 58) Bamako, Mali
- Genres: Music of Mali; pop; world music
- Occupation: Musician
- Instrument: Kora
- Years active: 1987–2024
- Label: World Circuit
- Formerly of: Songhai; The Symmetric Orchestra; Lamomali
- Children: Sidiki Diabaté (son)
- Relatives: Mamadou Sidiki Diabaté (brother)

Toumani Diabaté (/ˌtuˈmɑːˌni ˌdʒɑːˈbɑːˌteɪ/ too-MAH-nee jah-BAH-tay; 10 August 1965 – 19 July 2024) was a Malian kora player. In addition to performing the traditional music of Mali, he was involved in cross-cultural collaborations with flamenco, blues, jazz, and other international styles of music. In 2006, a panel commissioned by The Independent named him one of the fifty best African artists across media. In its obituary, The Times described him as "a bold and innovative musical visionary".

== Biography ==
Diabaté was born on 10 August 1965 in Bamako, the capital of Mali, five years after the country had gained its independence from France. He came from a long family tradition of players of the kora, a 21-string west African harp-like instrument. His father, Sidiki Diabaté, recorded the first-ever kora album, in 1970. His mother, Nene Koita, was a singer. His family's oral tradition tells of 70 generations of musicians preceding him in a patrilineal line. His cousin Sona Jobarteh was the first female professional kora player to come from a griot family. His younger brother Mamadou Sidiki Diabaté is also a kora player. According to Diabaté, a childhood illness resulted in his losing the use of his right leg, and he walked using a crutch.

As a boy, Diabaté absorbed the griot culture around him and learned from watching his father and grandfather play. He recalled that his father's style involved combining the functions of bass line, melody, and improvisation, and Diabaté learned to play the kora that way. He was performing in public by the age of 13 and became one of the musicians in the backing group of jelimuso (female griot singer) Kandia Kouyaté.

In 1987, Diabaté made an appearance on Ba Togoma, an album featuring his father's ensemble. This was his opportunity to be heard outside his homeland. In 1988, he released his first album in the West, a solo endeavour entitled Kaira, recorded in one afternoon in London and produced by Lucy Durán.

Diabaté also performed and recorded in cross-cultural settings. He collaborated with flamenco group Ketama, forming a combined group known as Songhai and releasing two albums: Songhai and Songhai II. In 1999, Diabaté collaborated with American blues musician Taj Mahal on the release Kulanjan. MALIcool (2002) was a collaboration with American jazz trombonist Roswell Rudd. Diabaté also worked with Icelandic musician Björk on her 2007 album, Volta, and subsequently appeared with her at the Glastonbury Festival.

In 1999, Diabaté released the album New Ancient Strings, a collaboration with Ballaké Sissoko. In September 2005, he released In the Heart of the Moon, for which he collaborated with Ali Farka Touré. The album went on to win the 2006 Grammy Award for Best Traditional World Music Album. On 25 July 2006, he released Boulevard de l'Indépendance, recorded with his Symmetric Orchestra. In the Heart of the Moon and Boulevard de l'Indépendance are both part of the Hotel Mandé Sessions, recorded by Nick Gold and released on World Circuit Records. Both Boulevard and Hotel Mandé are references to landmarks in Mali's capital city, Bamako.

The Symmetric Orchestra, led by Diabaté, is composed of West African musicians (mostly griots), who play a mix of traditional instruments including the kora, djembe, balafon, and bolombatto, as well as modern ones such as the guitar and electronic keyboard.

Diabaté appeared in 2006 at the WOMAD Festival UK, Roskilde Festival in Denmark, and at the Sziget Festival in Budapest, Hungary. In 2007, he performed at the Glastonbury Festival and toured the US. In 2008, he was at WOMADelaide in Adelaide, Australia. In early 2008, Diabaté released a new album of solo kora music, The Mandé Variations, to widespread critical acclaim, including a nomination for a Grammy award. Many reviewers praised the project for its detailed recording of the kora and careful mastering, in addition to the improvisational skills and wide range of apparent influences on display.

In October 2008, the Arabic-language lyrics in Diabaté's song "Tapha Niang" (from Boulevard de l'Indépendance) were removed from the PlayStation 3 video game LittleBigPlanet, after it elicited objections from a Muslim individual due to their inclusion of verses from the Qur'an. The publisher, Sony Computer Entertainment Europe, decided to delay the launch of the game by a week and recall most discs in order to replace the song with a lyric-free instrumental version. However, some copies of the original game had already been sold in the Middle East and United States.

In December 2008, Diabaté was appointed a United Nations Goodwill Ambassador for the work he did in highlighting HIV and AIDS through his music.

Diabaté was chosen by Matt Groening to perform at the English All Tomorrow's Parties festival in May 2010. He also performed at Hay Festival in June. In July, he played at the Larmer Tree Festival.

In March 2014, he received an honorary doctorate in music from SOAS for his contribution in raising awareness of the kora and traditional Malian music.

In 2015, Diabaté joined the musical collective Lamomali, formed by French musician -M-, which also included his son Sidiki Diabaté, his brother Mamadou Sidiki Diabaté, and singer-songwriter Fatoumata Diawara, among others. They released their self-titled, debut album, in 2017, and followed it with Totem in 2025, after Diabaté's death. Totem was reissued as Je t'aime later the same year.

In February 2016, Diabaté hosted Festival Acoustik Bamako, a three-day music festival to bring together international and Malian musicians along with other public figures with an overall message of peace. It was planned as a collection of outdoor and indoor music events to draw crowds of more than 20,000 people. The 2015 Bamako hotel attack meant that all the outdoor events were cancelled, however.

Diabaté died after a short illness on 19 July 2024, at the age of 58. He was survived by his wives, Fanta Sacko and Sira Diallo, and his sons Balla and Sidiki, with whom he had recorded a Grammy-nominated album of kora duets in 2014.

== Discography ==
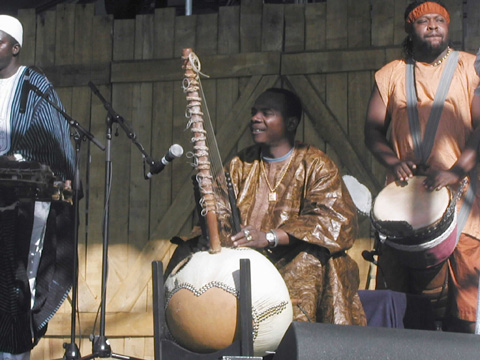
Diabaté performing at the 2007 Winnipeg Folk Festival

- Kaira (1988)
- Songhai (with Ketama and Danny Thompson) (1988)
- Shake the Whole World (with Symmetric Orchestra) (1992)
- Songhai 2 (with Ketama, Danny Thompson, and José Soto) (1994)
- Djelika (1995)
- New Ancient Strings (with Ballaké Sissoko) (1999)
- Kulanjan (with Taj Mahal) (1999)
- Malicool (with Roswell Rudd) (2002)
- In the Heart of the Moon (with Ali Farka Touré) (2005)
- The Mandé Variations (2008)
- Ali and Toumani – (with Ali Farka Touré) (2010)
- Symphonie Mandingue – Live (2011)
- A Curva da Cintura (with Arnaldo Antunes and Edgard Scandurra) (2011)
- Toumani & Sidiki (with Sidiki Diabaté) (2014)
- Lamomali (with Lamomali) (2017)
- The Ripple Effect (with Béla Fleck) (2020)
- Kôrôlén (with the London Symphony Orchestra) (2021)
- Toumani, Family & Friends (2022)
- The Sky Is the Same Colour Everywhere (with Kayhan Kalhor) (2023)
- Totem (with Lamomali) (posthumous release, 2025) — reissued as Je t'aime, also in 2025

== Filmography ==
- Bamako Is a Miracle by Maurice Engler, Arnaud Robert, and Samuel Chalard (Afro Blue, Geneva, 2003).
- Toumani Diabaté – Koraklänge aus dem Land der Flusspferde by Martina Pfaff (WDR, Cologne, 2007).
