= Ali Farka Touré =

Malian singer and musician (1939–2006)

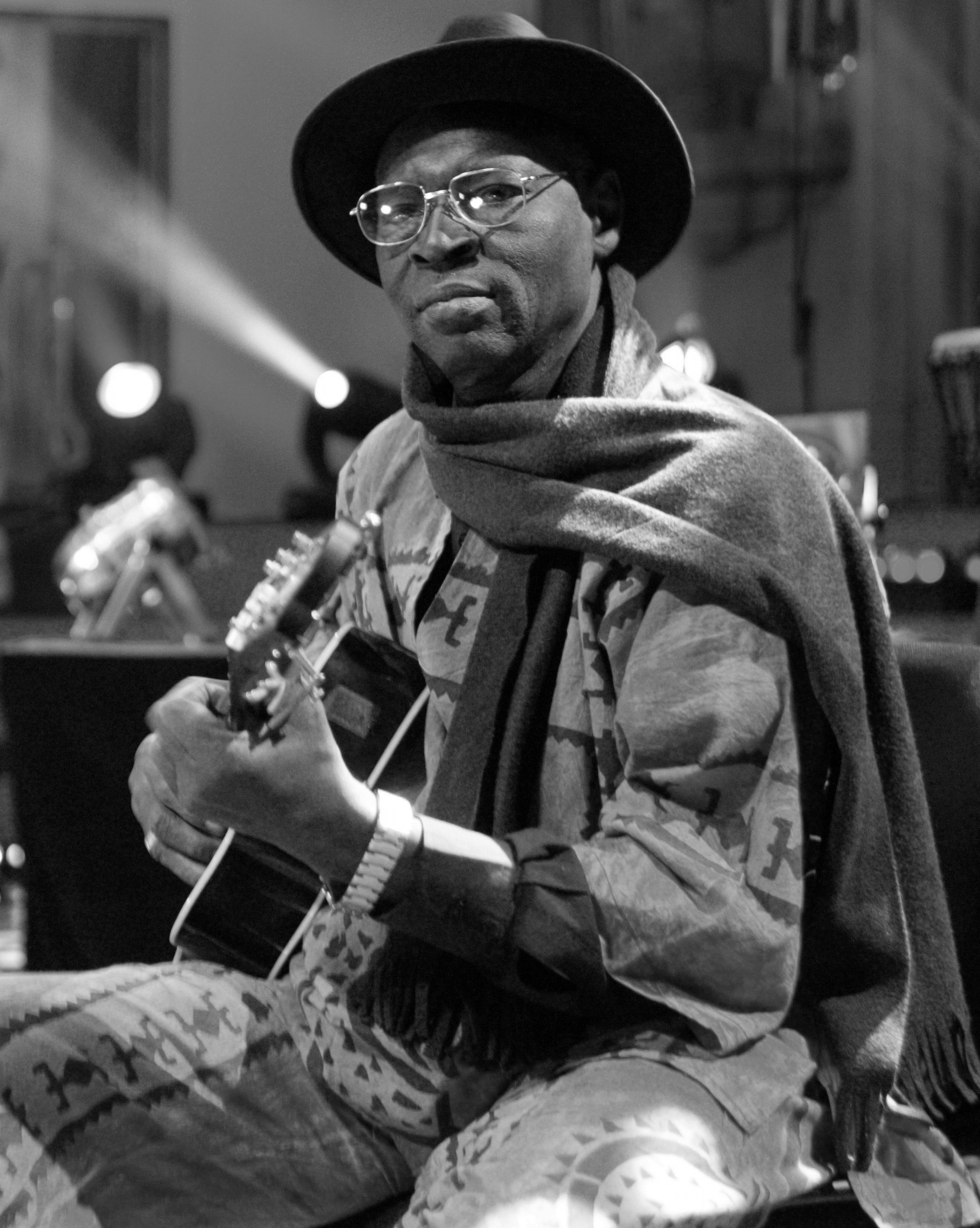
- Touré in 2005

Background information
- Born: Ali Ibrahim Touré; 31 October 1939; Timbuktu Region, Mali
- Origin: Niafunké, Mali
- Died: 6 March 2006 (aged 66) Bamako, Mali
- Genres: Blues, malian folk, folk, desert blues, world music
- Instruments: Vocals, Guitar, Cabasa, Njarka
- Label: World Circuit
- Children: Vieux Farka Touré (son)
- Relatives: Afel Bocoum (nephew)

Ali Ibrahim "Ali Farka" Touré (31 October 1939 – 6 March 2006) was a Malian singer and multi-instrumentalist, and one of the African continent's most internationally renowned musicians. His music blends traditional Malian music and its derivative, African-American blues, and is considered a pioneer of African desert blues. Touré was ranked number 76 on Rolling Stone's list of "The 100 Greatest Guitarists of All Time" and number 37 on Spin magazine's "100 Greatest Guitarists of All Time".

Some years after his death, a group of musicians playing in his style performed as the Ali Farka Touré Allstars (2012), and later the Ali Farka Touré Band (formed 2014).

== Early life ==
Touré was born in 1939 in the village of Kanau, on the banks of the Niger River in Gourma-Rharous Cercle in the northwestern Malian region of Tombouctou. His family belonged to the Songhai community and moved to the nearby village of Niafunké when he was still an infant. His father died serving in the French Army in 1940. He was the tenth son of his mother but the only one to survive past infancy. "The name I was given was Ali Ibrahim, but it's a custom in Africa to give a child a strange nickname if you have had other children who have died," Touré was quoted as saying in a biography on his record label, World Circuit Records. His nickname, "Farka", chosen by his parents, means "donkey", an animal admired for its tenacity and stubbornness: "Let me make one thing clear. I'm the donkey that nobody climbs on!"

=== Early musical influences ===
In Malian society, musical performance was the duty of a lower caste known as the griot. Since Touré was from the "noble" caste, he was forbidden to play any musical instruments. He disregarded this and secretly built a monochord from a tin can and played it with his friends.

Having worked various jobs as a young adult including as a chauffeur and an ambulance boatman, it was a performance by the national ballet of Guinea in 1956 that would influence Touré to pursue a career in music. It was the guitar playing during this performance that made Ali determined to learn the instrument.

During the 1960s, Mali hosted and held national talent competitions aimed at bringing together the various diverse groups of people that lived within the newly independent nation, such as the Bambara in the south, the nomadic Tuareg in the North and the Fula and Songhai in the Sahel. It was at these competitions that Touré soaked up the music of all these different cultures and learned to sing in seven languages.

Touré had great success at these competitions and ended up heading to Bulgaria to represent Mali internationally. It was during this trip that he bought his first guitar, and it was also the first time that he heard the music that was being produced by African Americans in the United States during the 1960s, of which Touré instantly became a fan. He was particularly fond of the music of John Lee Hooker and has stated that, “The first time I heard John Lee Hooker, I heard his music but I said ‘I don’t understand this, where did they come up with this culture? This is something that belongs to us.”

Although Touré has been described as "The African Bluesman", he insisted that his music was not blues, stated that, “To me blues is a type of soap powder, my music is older than the blues”.

== Musical career ==
As the first African bluesman to achieve widespread popularity on his home continent, Touré was often known as "the African John Lee Hooker". Musically, the many superpositions of guitars and rhythms in his music were similar to John Lee Hooker's hypnotic blues style. He usually sang in one of several African languages, mostly Songhay, Fulfulde, Tamasheq or Bambara as on his breakthrough album, Ali Farka Touré, which established his reputation in the world music community.

Touré spent the 1970s as a sound engineer at Radio Mali in Bamako. This allowed him the opportunity to use the radio station's recording studio, which at the time was the only recording studio in Mali. Touré sent tapes of his recordings to various record labels in France and eventually ended up releasing a series of albums simply titled Ali Farka Touré in the late 1970s and early '80s.

In 1986, Touré captured the attention of the British market when tracks from one of his albums referred to as ‘the red album’ was played on British radio. British DJ Andy Kershaw discovered "the red album" while in Paris looking for records that were difficult to find in the UK. He recalls how he purchased the album at random from among a pile of others as its cover had stood out to him. Upon listening to it after returning home to North London, Kershaw realised he had found something special. When he played a few tracks during his segment on BBC Radio One, it provoked an extraordinary reaction from his listeners.

It was this that grasped the attention of Anne Hunt of World Circuit Records. In the mid-1980s, Hunt travelled to Mali to track down Touré and eventually found him by broadcasting a message on Radio Mali seeking information about his whereabouts. World Circuit Records brought him to Britain for the first time in autumn 1987 to record Ali Farka Touré, by which time he had also begun touring outside Africa - including at the Great American Music Hall in San Francisco, California, on 10 April 1987, although Touré's first North American concert was in Harrison Hot Springs, British Columbia..

Ultimately, he recorded seven albums with World Circuit Records, some of which included contributions from non-African musicians such as Seán Keane and Kevin Conneff of The Chieftains on the album The River in 1990 and Nitin Sawhney and the American blues player Taj Mahal on The Source in 1992.

Touré's most high-profile collaboration of the early '90s was Talking Timbuktu (1994) with Ry Cooder. This sold well in Western markets, although Cooder later recalled how Touré did not like recording the album in the Hollywood studio and described it as a place of "bad energy", and the United States in general as a "spiritual car park". The album won a Grammy Award for Best World Music Album.

This was followed by a hiatus from releases in America and Europe until he reappeared in 1999 with Niafunké, a more traditional album focusing on African rhythms and beats, named after his hometown and recorded in an abandoned school there as Touré's record producer felt that a recording studio overseas would diminish the quality of the music.

In 2002, Touré worked with Black American blues and reggae performer Corey Harris, on Harris's album Mississippi to Mali (Rounder Records). Toure and Harris also appeared together in Martin Scorsese's 2003 documentary film Feel Like Going Home, which traced the roots of blues back to its genesis in West Africa. Narrated by Harris, the film features Touré's performances on guitar and njarka.

Touré was very supportive of director Manny Ansar's idea to move Festival au Désert to Timbuktu, after its first two years in the Kidal region of Mali. He said that he had always wanted to bring people home, but did not know how to do that, and that now that this festival had been organised, he would support it; he would be their "godfather". He started performing at the festival, bringing in a lot of his fans, more visitors, tourists, and journalists. He performed the closing concert every year from 2003 until 2006.

In 2005, Touré recorded "Bèrèbèrè", a song duet with Malian guitarist and singer Idrissa Soumaoro, which was released on Soumaoro's second album Djitoumou. Thirteen years later, "Bèrèbèrè" – which means "to help each other" in Bambara, Mali's national language – was used in the 2018 Marvel Studios film Black Panther to illustrate the moment when leading characters T'Challa and Nakia walk through a market after a long separation.

In September 2005, Touré released the album In the Heart of the Moon, a collaboration with Toumani Diabaté, for which he received a second Grammy Award. His last album, Savane, was posthumously released in July 2006 and included backing vocals by popular Malian musician Afel Bocoum, a nephew mentored by Touré since 1968.

Savane was received with wide acclaim by professionals and fans alike and was nominated for a Grammy Award in the category "Best Contemporary World Music Album". The panel of experts from the World Music Chart Europe (WMCE), a chart voted by the leading World Music specialists around Europe, chose Savane as their Album of the Year 2006, with the album topping the chart for three consecutive months (September to November 2006). The album has also been listed as No. 1 in the influential Metacritic's "Best Albums of 2006" poll, and No. 5 in its all-time best reviewed albums. Ali Farka Touré was also nominated for the BBC Radio 3 awards 2007.

== Personal life ==
In 2004 Touré became mayor of Niafunké and spent his own money grading the roads, putting in sewer canals and fuelling a generator that provided the impoverished town with electricity.

== Death and legacy ==
On 6 March 2006, the Ministry of Culture of Mali announced Touré's death at age 66 in Bamako from bone cancer, which he had been battling for some time. His record label, World Circuit, said that he had recorded several tracks with his son, Vieux Farka Touré, for Vieux's debut album, released in late 2006..

In 2005, a year before his death, the Ali Farka Touré Foundation was created in Bamako in his honour and to further his musical legacy. The foundation was represented by Ali Guindo at a 2017 show in New York City.

Musicians playing in his style played as the Ali Farka Touré Allstars at the last Festival au Désert in Timbuktu in 2012. In 2017, the Ali Farka Touré Band (which had formed in 2014) played as part of the "Caravane culturelle de la paix" in New York City, with a line-up led by lead vocalist Afel Bocoum, and including djembe player Souleymane Kane, guitar and vocalist Aly Magassa, guitar and vocalist Mamadou Kelly, and electric bass guitarist Oumar Diallo.

== In popular culture ==
Some of Touré's songs and tunes have been used in different programmes, films and documentaries. For instance, his guitar riff on the song "Diaraby", from the album Talking Timbuktu, was selected for the Geo-quiz segment of The World PRI-BBC programme, and was retained by popular demand when put to a vote of the listeners. This song is likewise used in 1998 as a soundtrack for the film L'Assedio (Besieged) by Italian director Bernardo Bertolucci. Touré's songs "Cinquante six", "Goye Kur" and "Hawa Dolo" from the album The Source are also used as a soundtrack in the French film Fin août, début septembre (Late August, Early September), directed in 1998 by Olivier Assayas. The song "Lasidan" was featured in the award-winning documentary Sharkwater (2006) by Rob Stewart.

- In the French film l'Auberge espagnole (2002), two characters are seen playing air guitar to "Ai Du".
- In the movie Unfaithful (2002), Diane Lane and Olivier Martinez slow dance to "Ai Du".
- In the French film Irma Vep (1996), Maggie Cheung and Nathalie Richard ride an old motorcycle down the quay to Touré's song "Soukora".
- In the 2005 travel film Michael Palin: SAHARA, his music is heard in a scene about Nigerian nomads.
- In the 2007 movie The Nanny Diaries three songs are used, Kala, Kadi Kadi, and Hawa Dolo.
- The World, a radio show distributed by Public Radio International, uses the song "Diaraby" as the theme to their Geoquiz. The song is a collaboration between Touré and Ry Cooder from their Talking Timbuktu album.
- In the French localizations of Nintendo's Animal Crossing games, the song called "Safari K.K." in English-speaking regions is instead referred to as "Ali Farka Kéké".
- In 2017, at Documenta 14, a 100-day modern art exhibition held every five years in Kassel, Germany, director Igo Diarra of Galerie Medina and Dolly Kola-Balogun of Retro Africa paid tribute to Touré by curating "Proud and Well" in the Henschel halls. Photographs, record covers, objects and his music were presented, and the programme also included a workshop and a performance by the Ali Farka Touré Band.
- In 2018, the song "Bèrèbèrè", Idrissa Soumaoro's 2005 duet with Touré, was used in the 2018 Marvel Studios film Black Panther. The cover of the album Djitoumou from which the song comes seems to have inspired the scene in which "Bèrèbèrè" is heard as T'Challa and Nakia walk in the heart of a lively market.
- In 2020, Touré featured in the book Greenlights by Matthew McConaughey. In part five, McConaughey recalls how in 1999 he was inspired to visit the African continent by a dream that he had. He goes on to reveal that Ali Farka Touré was one of his favourite musicians and that it was listening to Touré's music that inspired him to choose the country of Mali for his visit to the African continent. He spent four days travelling to Niafunké from Bamako to spend the day with Touré and his wife before continuing his journey along the Niger River.
- In 2022, the Texan trio Khruangbin teamed up with Malian singer and guitarist Vieux Farka Touré for "Ali", a semi-improvised tribute to his father Ali Farka Touré.

== Discography ==
- 1976 – Ali Touré Farka (Sonafric 50016-LP)
- 1976 – Spécial « Biennale du Mali » (Sonafric 50020-LP)
- 1978 – Biennale (Sonafric 50032-LP)
- 1979 – Ali Touré Farka (Sonafric 50060-LP)
- 1980 – Ali Touré dit Farka (Sonafric 50085-LP)
- 1984 – Ali Farka Tou"Bré (Red) (Sonodisc/Esperance 5558)
- 1988 – Ali Farka Touré (Green) (Sonodisc/Esperance 8448)
- 1988 – Ali Farka Touré (World Circuit WCD007 / Mango 9826)
- 1990 – African Blues (Shanachie 65002) (originally released as Ali Farka Touré (Green))
- 1990 – The River (World Circuit WCD017 / Mango 9897)
- 1992 – The Source (World Circuit WCD030 / Hannibal 1375) (with Taj Mahal)
- 1994 – Talking Timbuktu (World Circuit WCD040 / Hannibal 1381) (with Ry Cooder)
- 1996 – Radio Mali (World Circuit WCD044 / Nonesuch 79569) (remastered selections of original albums from 1975 through 1980)
- 1999 – Niafunké (World Circuit WCD054 / Hannibal 1443)
- 2002 – Mississippi to Mali (Rounder B0000DJZA1)(with Corey Harris)
- 2004 – Red&Green (World Circuit WCD070 / Nonesuch 79882) (remastered original albums from 1984 and 1988)
- 2005 – In the Heart of the Moon (World Circuit WCD072 / Nonesuch 79920) (with Toumani Diabaté)
- 2006 – Savane (World Circuit WCD075 / Nonesuch 79965)
- 2010 – Ali and Toumani – (World Circuit/Nonesuch Records) (with Toumani Diabaté)
- 2022 - Voyageur (World Circuit) WCD097)

== Filmography ==
- 2002 – Ali Farka Touré – Le miel n'est jamais bon dans une seule bouche – a documentary film by Marc Huraux
- A Visit to Ali Farka Toure was released on DVD in the UK by Digital Classics DVD.
- I'll Sing for You, 2001

== Grammy Awards and nominations ==
Year Awarded	Nominee/work	Category	Result	Ref.
1994	Talking Timbuktu	Best World Music Album	Won	
1999	Niafunké	Best World Music Album	Nominated	
2005	In The Heart Of The Moon	Best World Music Album	Won	
2006	Savane	Best Contemporary World Music Album	Nominated	
2010	Ali and Toumani	Best Traditional World Music Album	Won	

== See also ==
- African fingerstyle guitar
- African music
