= Tisserdmine =

Coordinates: 31°17′52.98″N 3°58′30.54″W

Tisserdmine is a village is located on the edge of Erg Chebbi, a Saharan erg in southeast Morocco near the Algerian border.

The most well-known nearby settlement is Merzouga. Other villages around the dunes are Hassilabied, Tanamoust, Takoujt, and Khamlia.
