= Takoujt =

Village in the Sahara Desert, Morocco

Coordinates: 31.1119°N 4.0091°W

Takoujt village is located on the bottom of Erg Chebbi, a Saharan erg in southeast Morocco near the Algerian border.

Its most well known nearby village is Merzouga. Other villages around the dunes are Hassilabied, Tanamoust, Khamlia and Tisserdmine.
