= Tanamoust =

Coordinates: 31.0678°N 4.0173°W

Tanamoust is located at the bottom of Erg Chebbi, a Saharan erg in southeast Morocco near the Algerian border.

It most famous well known nearby village is Merzouga. Other villages around the dunes are Hassilabied, Takoujt, Khamlia, and Tisserdmine.
