= Dambé: The Mali Project =

- Directed by: Dearbhla Glynn
- Produced by: Vanessa Gildea
- Starring: Liam Ó Maonlaí; Paddy Keenan; Afel Bocoum and Alkibar; Toumani Diabaté; Ali Farka Touré; Sally'Ag Wantifout; Tartit; Tinariwen
- Cinematography: Paddy Jordan; Dearbhla Glynn
- Edited by: Jim Bruce
- Music by: Liam Ó Maonlaí; Paddy Keenan; Afel Bocoum and Alkibar; Toumani Diabaté; Ali Farka Touré; Sally'Ag Wantifout; Tartit; Tinariwen
- Release date: 2008
- Running time: 94 minutes
- Country: Ireland
- Languages: English; French; Irish

Dambé: The Mali Project is a documentary film directed by Dearbhla Glynn (Dublin to Gaza), and produced by Vanessa Gildea. The film documents as the Irish musicians Liam Ó Maonlaí and Paddy Keenan embark on a musical adventure to Mali in West Africa. Travelling over 3,000 miles they meet and collaborate with people from musicians (Afel Bocoum, Toumani Diabaté) to nomadic herders, culminating in a performance at the remote musical festival Festival au Désert.

The film premiered on 16 February 2008, at the 2008 Jameson Dublin International Film Festival. The film was described as "Engrossing, visually rich and surprisingly moving" by Paul Whitington in the Irish Independent, and "A unique work, which is well-told and unexpectedly moving in parts" by Steve Cummins of RTÉ.

== Synopsis ==
The film follows musicians Liam Ó Maonlaí (The Hothouse Flowers) and Paddy Keenan (Uilleann pipes player from The Bothy Band, who was raised in the traveller community) on a journey covering thousands of miles from Bamako in the south to Timbuktu, from where they enter the Sahara.

Their journey takes them along the river Niger, stopping in villages and river towns such as Mopti and Djenné, playing instruments such as the harp, bodhrán, whistles and Uilleann pipes with local musicians including Afel Bocoum, Toumani Diabaté, Tinariwen, and Tartit. The film highlights the many similarities between Malian and Irish music, including circular repetitive rhythms, similar instruments (i.e. the Kora and the harp, the gourd and the bodhrán) and a similar style of singing (Griot & Sean-nós).

Their ultimate destination is Essakane, 90 km outside of Timbuktu, where they performed to an audience of thousands of Tuareg at the remote music festival, Festival au Désert.
