= Erg Chigaga =

Moroccan erg

Coordinates: 29.8278°N 6.2500°W

Erg Chegaga

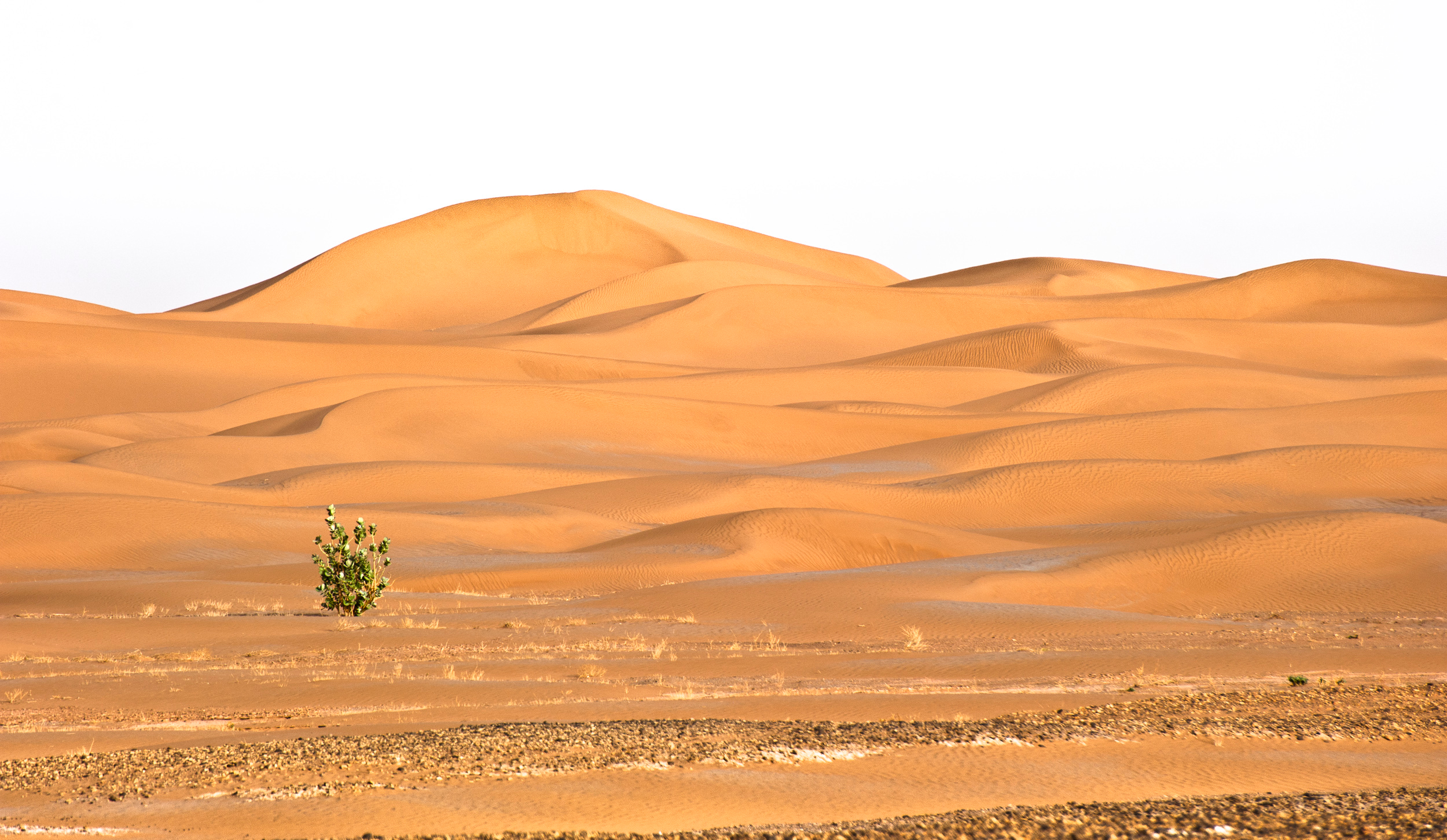
Erg Chgaga, August 2018

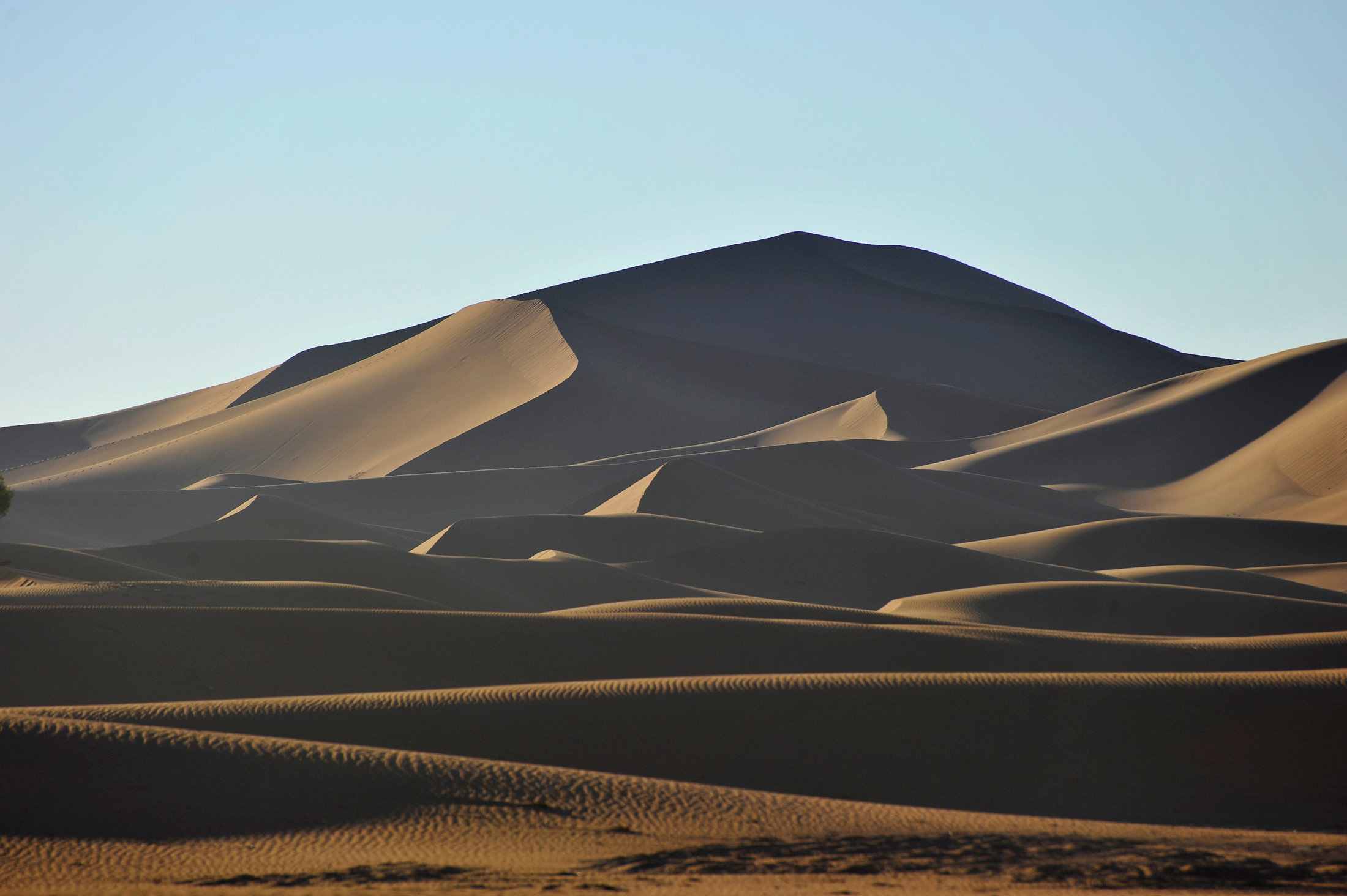
Erg Chegaga dunes at dawn, November 2018

Erg Chigaga or Erg Chegaga (Arabic: عرق شقاق; Berber languages: ⴻⵔⴳ ⵛⴳⵉⴳⴰ) is the largest of the major ergs (dune seas) in Morocco. It is located in the Draa valley in the southeastern part of the country. The other well-known erg in the country is Erg Chebbi near Merzouga.

This erg made of sand dunes is located in the Drâa-Tafilalet area about 56 kilometres (35 mi) southwest of the town of M'Hamid El Ghizlane. Some dunes are over 50m above the surrounding landscape. The north border is represented by Djebel Bani, the east border is represented by M'Hamid hamada. To the southeast is the Erg Smar, adjacent to Erg Ezzahar, and to the west is the Iriki Lake, a dried lake now part of the Iriqui National Park since 1994.
