= Paddy Keenan =

Irish player of the uilleann pipes (1950–2026)

- Born: 30 January 1950; Trim, County Meath, Ireland
- Died: 9 September 2026 (aged 76)
- Genres: Celtic; folk
- Occupations: Musician; songwriter
- Instruments: Uilleann pipes; tin whistle
- Years active: 1964–2026
- Formerly of: The Bothy Band; The Bucks
- Website: paddykeenan.com

Paddy Keenan (30 January 1950 – 9 September 2026) was an Irish player of the uilleann pipes who first gained fame as a founding member of The Bothy Band. From the group's dissolution in the late 1970s, Keenan released a number of solo and collaborative recordings, and toured both as a soloist, and with singer/guitarist Tommy O'Sullivan.

== Life and career ==
=== The early years ===
Paddy Keenan was born in Trim, County Meath on 30 January 1950, to John Keenan (an Irish Traveller) and Mary Bravender Keenan (of settled descent). Though the Keenan family abandoned the Traveling lifestyle early in Paddy's life, he spent much of his youth contending with discrimination, including regular physical confrontations. His father and grandfather both played the pipes, and his father spent many nights playing along with piper Johnny Doran. When he was about six years old, Keenan was introduced to the tin whistle by his brother Johnny (a notable Irish banjo player) and began playing the pipes around age nine.

Recognising his son's interest, John Keenan tutored Paddy, along with neighbouring children, including Finbar Furey and Davy Spillane. During this period, the Keenan household was an ongoing session. At age fourteen, Keenan played his first major concert at the Gaiety Theatre, Dublin, followed by a few years of touring with a number of musicians, including his father, as "The Pavees." At seventeen, Keenan went to England in an attempt to escape the strictness of his father's household, and ended up busking around London, singing and playing blues and rock songs on guitar for most of the following four years. After nearly selling or throwing away his pipes several times, he discovered in 1971 that busking with them was far more lucrative than with the guitar, and resumed his piping career.

=== Early groups and The Bothy Band ===
Returning to Dublin, Keenan played regularly with his brothers and father at folk clubs and various venues around Ireland. In 1975, he was part of a band called 'Seachtar', from the Irish word for 'seven people.' This band was the genesis of The Bothy Band, of which Keenan was a mainstay from its inception to its demise in 1979.

=== A solo career ===
Keenan's first (and eponymous) solo album appeared in 1975, and he also duetted with fiddler Paddy Glackin on the 1978 album Doublin. He subsequently recorded a second solo album for Gael-Linn Records, Poirt An Phiobaire, in 1983.

After rejecting the chance to join Moving Hearts in the early 1980s, Keenan's musical career went into abeyance. However, in the 1990s he relocated to North America, rediscovered his musical talents and in 1997 issued Na Keen Affair, recorded at Dadyeen Studios, St. John's, Newfoundland, Canada. Supporting musicians include Tommy Peoples and Patrick Moran on fiddle, Arty McGlynn and Tommy O'Sullivan on guitar, as well as Newfoundland musicians. This led to an ongoing musical relationship with the London-born, Kerry-based guitarist Tommy O'Sullivan. Together, the pair issued The Long Grazing Acre in 2001, touring jointly to promote the album. According to their respective websites, Keenan and O'Sullivan have continued to perform together periodically since 2001.

The 2008 documentary Dambé: The Mali Project tells the story of his 3000-mile cross-cultural musical adventure with Liam Ó Maonlaí (Hothouse Flowers) and friends, and features performances from the Festival au Désert.

== Pipes and pipemakers ==
Upon demonstrating an aptitude for, and interest in the pipes around the age of ten, John Keenan got Paddy a full set of pipes by John Clarks. Six years later, in 1966, Keenan's father bought him a full set made by the Crowley family, which (with the addition of a Leo Rowsome chanter), Paddy played until 2000. At that point, Keenan received a full set from maker Dave Williams of Grimsby, England, who died a few years later in a car accident. This set, which was a copy of the previous Crowley set, remained Keenan's primary instrument. He played a boxwood chanter made by David Quinn with this set.

== Death ==
Keenan died on 9 September 2026, at the age of 76.

== Discography ==
=== Solo albums ===
- Paddy Keenan (1975)
- Poirt An Phiobaire (1983)
- Ná Keen Affair (1997)

=== With Paddy Glackin ===
- Doublin' (1978)

=== As a Member of The Bucks ===
- Dancin' To The Ceili Band (1994)

=== With Tommy O'Sullivan ===
- The Long Grazing Acre (2001)

=== As a Member of Éire Japan ===
With Frankie Gavin and Junji Shirota (ja)

- Éire Japan (2015)

=== With The Pavees, Liam Weldon ===
- Shelta (2025) – recorded before 1970

== Sound sample ==
- Reels: Scotch Mary/Earls Chair/Pigeon on the Gate
- Air: Johnny's Tune, For The Avalon
