= Liam Ó Maonlaí =

Irish musician (born 1964)

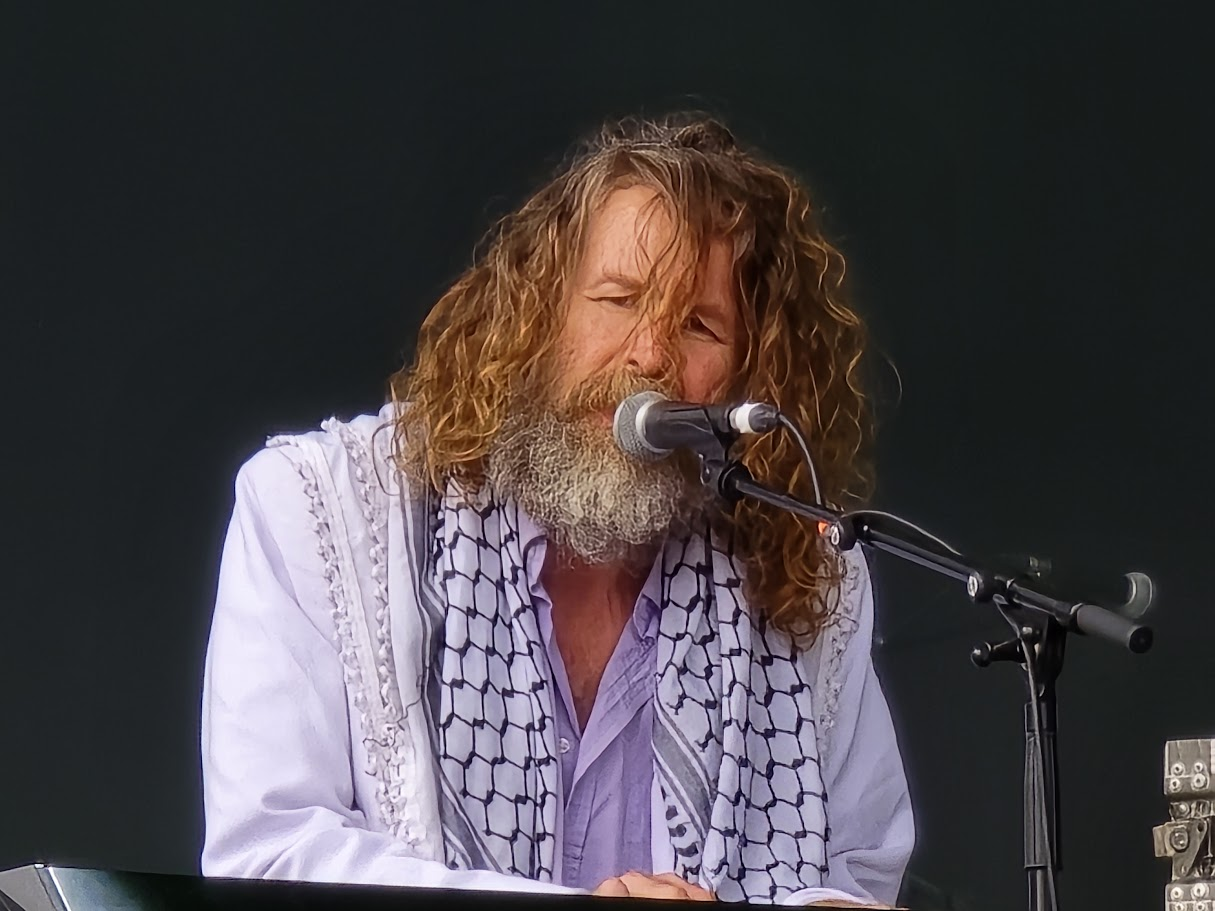
- Ó Maonlaí performing with Hothouse Flowers in 2024

Background information
- Born: 7 November 1964 (age 62); Monkstown, Dublin, Ireland
- Occupations: Musician; songwriter
- Instruments: Vocals; guitar; keyboards; bodhrán; whistle
- Years active: 1985–present
- Label: London
- Member of: Hothouse Flowers
- Formerly of: The Complex; ALT

Liam Ó Maonlaí (born 7 November 1964 in Monkstown, Dublin, Ireland) is an Irish musician best known as a member of Hothouse Flowers. Ó Maonlaí formed the band in 1985 with his schoolmate Fiachna Ó Braonáin.

== Biography ==
He attended Scoil Lorcáin, Monkstown and Coláiste Eoin, which is a Gaelscoil on Dublin's southside, although he credits his father as being the main influence for his love of the Irish language, of which he is a fluent speaker. He won an under-18 all-Ireland award for his skills on the bodhrán. Ó Maonlai first formed a band called The Complex with childhood friend Kevin Shields and drummer Colm Ó Cíosóig. After Liam left to form the Hothouse Flowers in 1984, Shields and Ó Cíosóig were joined by vocalist Dave Conway and keyboardist Tina (who used no surname), and renamed themselves My Bloody Valentine, taking their name from a low-budget horror film.

Ó Maonlaí is also an active member of the Nuclear Free Future movement and contributed to the hosting of events in Carnsore and in Wexford Town in 2001. In 2004 he was a guest at the Barefoot College, located at Rajasthan, India. In 2005 he released a solo album entitled Rían which is a collection of tunes and songs in Irish. He performed in the 2009 Dublin to Gaza benefit concert.

The 2008 documentary Dambé: The Mali Project tells the story of his 3,000 mile cross-cultural musical adventure with Paddy Keenan and friends, and features performances from the Festival au Désert.

== Acting ==
- "No Strings". Lovejoy. Season 3. Episode 2. 1992. - Himself
- I Could Read the Sky (1999) – Joe
- Timbuktu (2004) – Conor
- The Busker (2006) – Patrick O'Mallie
- Dambé: The Mali Project (2008), (documentary)

== Discography ==
- Rian (2005)
- To Be Touched (2009)

=== Guest singles ===
Year	Single	Artist	Peak chart positions		Album
Year	Single	Artist	CAN AC	CAN	Album
1995	"Grey Dusk of Eve"	The Rankin Family	31	85	Grey Dusk of Eve
