= Dublin to Gaza =

2009 benefit concert

- benefit concert tour by various performers
- Venue: Tripod music venue
- Date(s): 16 October 2009

Dublin to Gaza Concert or Two Cities–One Concert was a benefit concert which took place at the Tripod music venue on Harcourt Street in Dublin, Ireland on 16 October 2009. The concert performances were transmitted live to an extra audience in Gaza City in the Gaza Strip, as well as the one in Dublin.

The Dublin to Gaza Concert was established and put together by the Irish journalist and creator of documentaries Dearbhla Glynn. Any money raised during the concert will be donated towards the efforts of reconstructing those buildings which have been damaged in the Gaza Strip. There was, however, a cultural element to the benefit concert as well the principal idea of fund-raising. The audience in Gaza were also granted the opportunity to communicate with the audience in Dublin to deliver a message. The Palestine Telegraph described the benefit concert as a "unique event". A large screen was erected in Gaza City for citizens to witness the event live.

The concert featured performances from a selection of Irish and international musicians. Those confirmed to perform included the Discovery Gospel Choir of Dublin, Zahara El Safty, the Irish folk band Kíla, Lumière, the British-born Palestinian singer and MC Shadia Mansour, rapper of Iraqi and English origin MC Lowkey, Naisrin and Hothouse Flowers member Liam Ó Maonlaí. The performances commenced at an early time on the evening to allow the live collaboration with Gaza as there is a two-hour time difference between the two countries. Posters were produced in both Arabic (for Gaza) and English (for Dublin).
