= The Long Grazing Acre =

Studio album by Paddy Keenan & Tommy O'Sullivan
- Released: 2001
- Recorded: Scrag Hill Studio Dingle, Jail Road Recording Studio Clonakilty
- Genre: Irish Folk
- Producers: Paddy Keenan, Tommy O’Sullivan, and Pearse Dunne

The Long Grazing Acre is a collaborative album released by uilleann piper Paddy Keenan and guitarist/singer Tommy O'Sullivan in 2001, featuring a combination of traditional, original, and covered folk songs and instrumental tunes within the Irish Traditional Music idiom. A number of the tunes on this album were written by Keenan for the soundtrack of the 1997 film Traveller, including "The Pavee Jig", "Antara" and "The Twirly haired Girl", though they were not used in the score.

== Track listing ==
No.	Title	Writer(s)	Length
1.	"Jigs: The Lost and found/The Hag at the Churn/The Wind Off the Lake"	Traditional	4:25
2.	"Tunes Medley: Eimhin's/Cahir’s Kitchen"	P. Keenan	5:35
3.	"Song: The Maids of Culmore"	Traditional	4:32
4.	"Reels: O’Rourke’s/The Spike Island Lassies/Lord McDonald’s"	Traditional	4:58
5.	"Tune: Jutland"	T. O'Sullivan	3:25
6.	"Jigs: Brother John/The Pavee Jig"	P. Keenan	3:38
7.	"Song: Stranger to Himself"	Sandy Denny	3:45
8.	"Jigs: Sliabh Russell/The Blarney Pilgrim/The Clare Jig"	Traditional	4:48
9.	"Tune: Mary Bravender"	P. Keenan	3:45
10.	"Reels: Antara^/The Twirly Haired Girl^/The Mountain Road**"	^P. Keenan, **Traditional	4:00
11.	"Song: Killing the Blues"	Rolly Salley	4:12
12.	"Jigs: Kitty O. Shea's/The Kerry Jig"	Traditional	4:00

== Musicians ==
- Paddy Keenan: uilleann pipes on 1,4,5,6,7,8,10,12, low whistle on 2,3,5,9
- Tommy O'Sullivan: guitar on all except 9, vocals on 3, 7, 11
- Greg Sheehan: percussion on all except 3,6,9
- James Blennerhassett: bass/double bass on all except 9
- Stephen Housden: electric guitar on 2,8
- John Fitzgerald: keyboard on 5, Organ on 11,12
- Mary Green: harmony vocals on 7
- Tríona Ní Dhomhnaill: harmonium on 9
- Pearse Dunne: chimes on 9

== Critical reception ==
Rick Anderson of AllMusic praised Keenan's "dazzling showcase of jaw-dropping technical prowess" and expressiveness, as well as O'Sullivan's generally "fine vocal performances", qualified only by a mention that his rendition of "Stranger to Himself" might have been "too bland." Ken Ricketts and Marya Parker of Musical Traditions call the album "great", but go on to say that many of Keenan's releases have been even better, and express a particular preference for the album's Traditional selections over its original compositions. Philippe Varlet also expresses disappointment with the album's modern direction and music selection, but praises the performers' technical abilities, awarding only three out of five stars.

== New uilleann pipes ==
This album is the first recording on which Keenan plays a new set of pipes which he commissioned from the late maker Dave Williams of Grimsby, England, and received in 2000. Williams patterned them after the set Keenan had been playing for the prior 35 years, which was made by the Crowley family (except for the chanter which was made by Leo Rowsome).
