= M'Hamid El Ghizlane =

Human settlement

Coordinates: 29°49′20″N 5°43′15″W

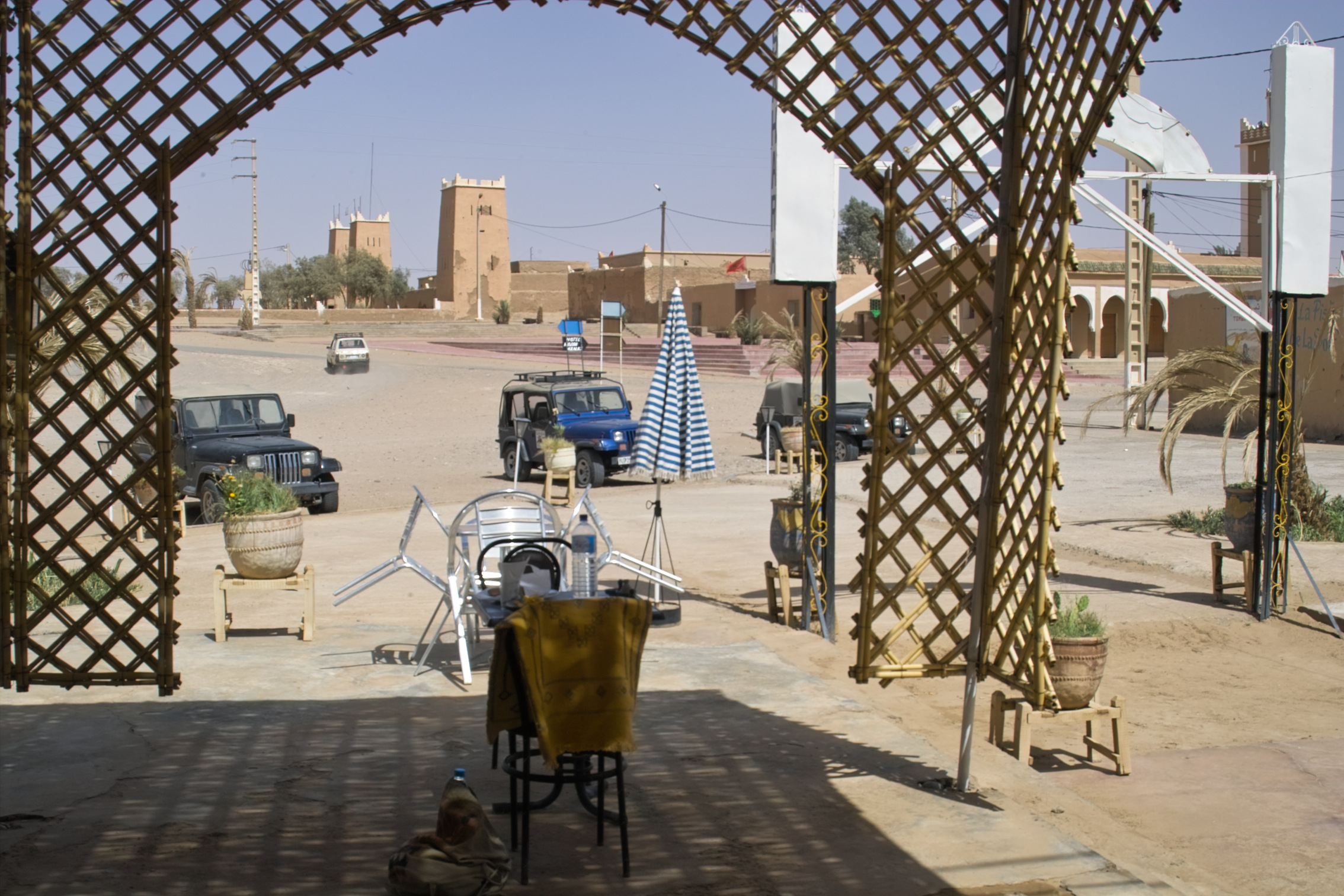
Tourist café and shop in M'Hamid, a starting point for exploring the desert by four-wheel drive cars and/or camel tours

M'Hamid El Ghizlane, also known as Lamhamid Ghozlane, (in Berber : ⵜⴰⵔⴰⴳⴰⵍⵜ Taragalt, in Arabic: محاميد الغزلان for "plain of gazelles") is a small oasis town in Zagora Province, Drâa-Tafilalet, Morocco, with about 7500 inhabitants.

== Location ==
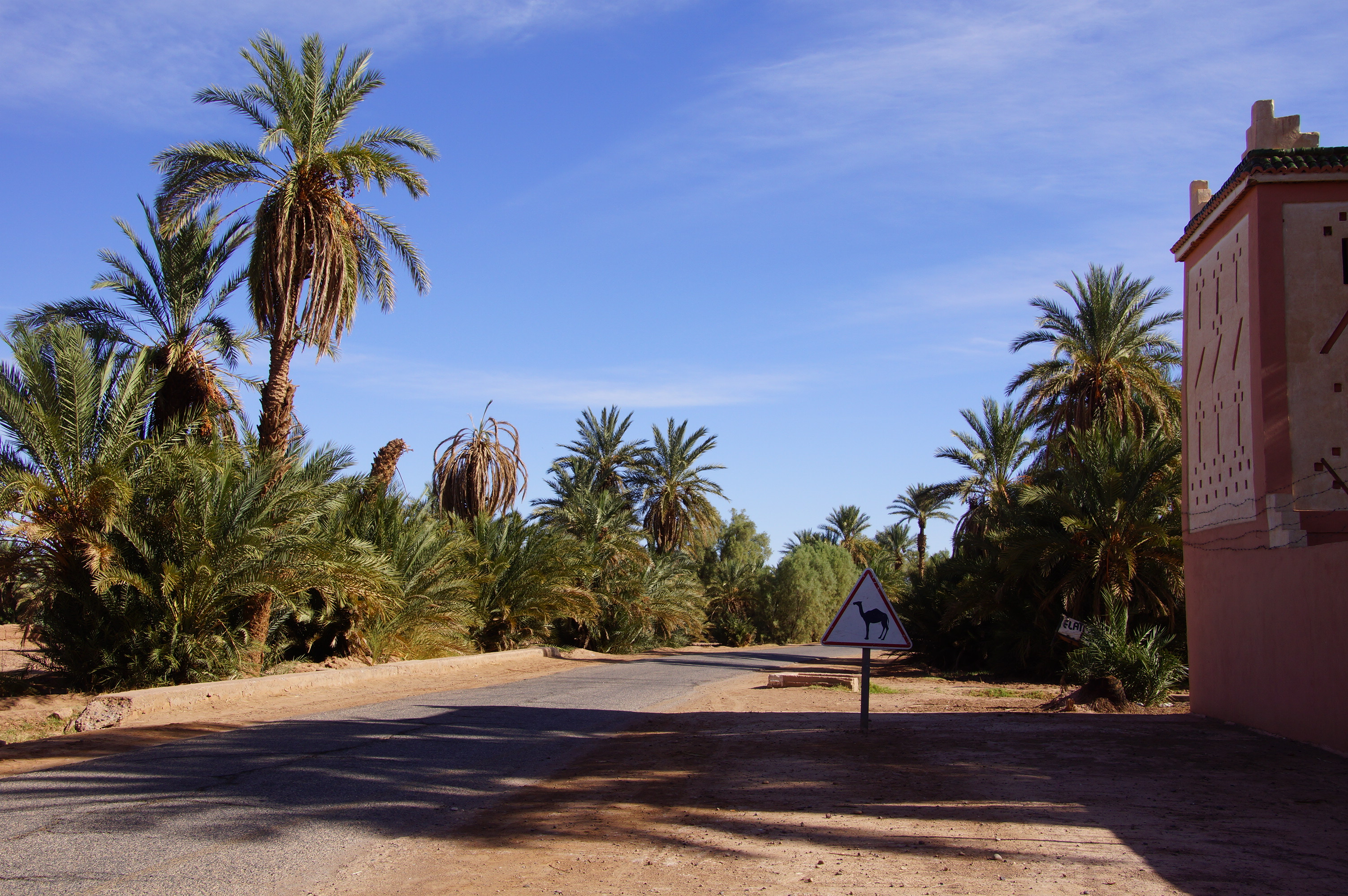
Mind the Camels on the road to Zagora and Ouarzazate

M'Hamid lies at an altitude of about 500 metres (1,600 ft) above sea level and about 24 kilometres (15 mi) from the Algerian border at the edge of the Sahara. M'Hamid can be reached at the end of National Route 9 from Ouarzazate (260 km) via Zagora (approx. 97 kilometres (60 mi)). Mhamid lies on the Wadi Draa, which rarely contains water.

== History ==
Little is known about the early history of the place because of the lack of written records. The spacious palm oases, however, make an early settlement support (about 3000 BC) likely. Due to the growth of the desert, the settlement has been threatened since the 2nd half of the 20th century by siltation, and the population is declining steadily. Until the end of the 1980s, a special permit was required to enter the area because it is close to the strategically important border with Algeria. Even today, many soldiers remain stationed in the area of Mhamid.

== Economics ==
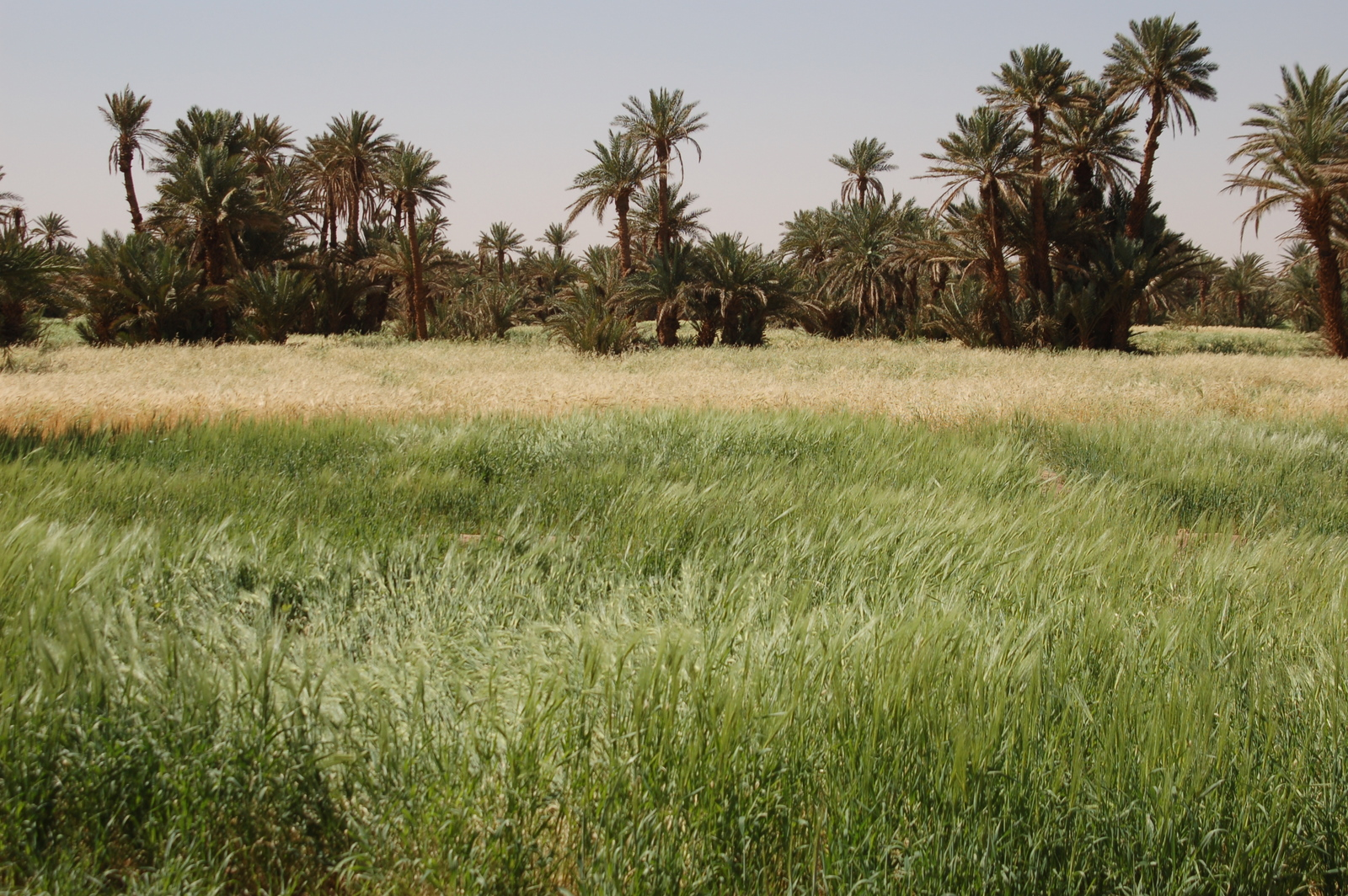
Oasis of M'Hamid

The people of M'Hamid lived according to the principles of self-sufficiency for hundreds of years but due to reduced or even absent winter rains since the 1970s, agriculture provided declining income and was abandoned almost entirely. In addition, a fungal disease (Fusarium oxysporum) has significantly affected the date palms which were already weakened by the drought.

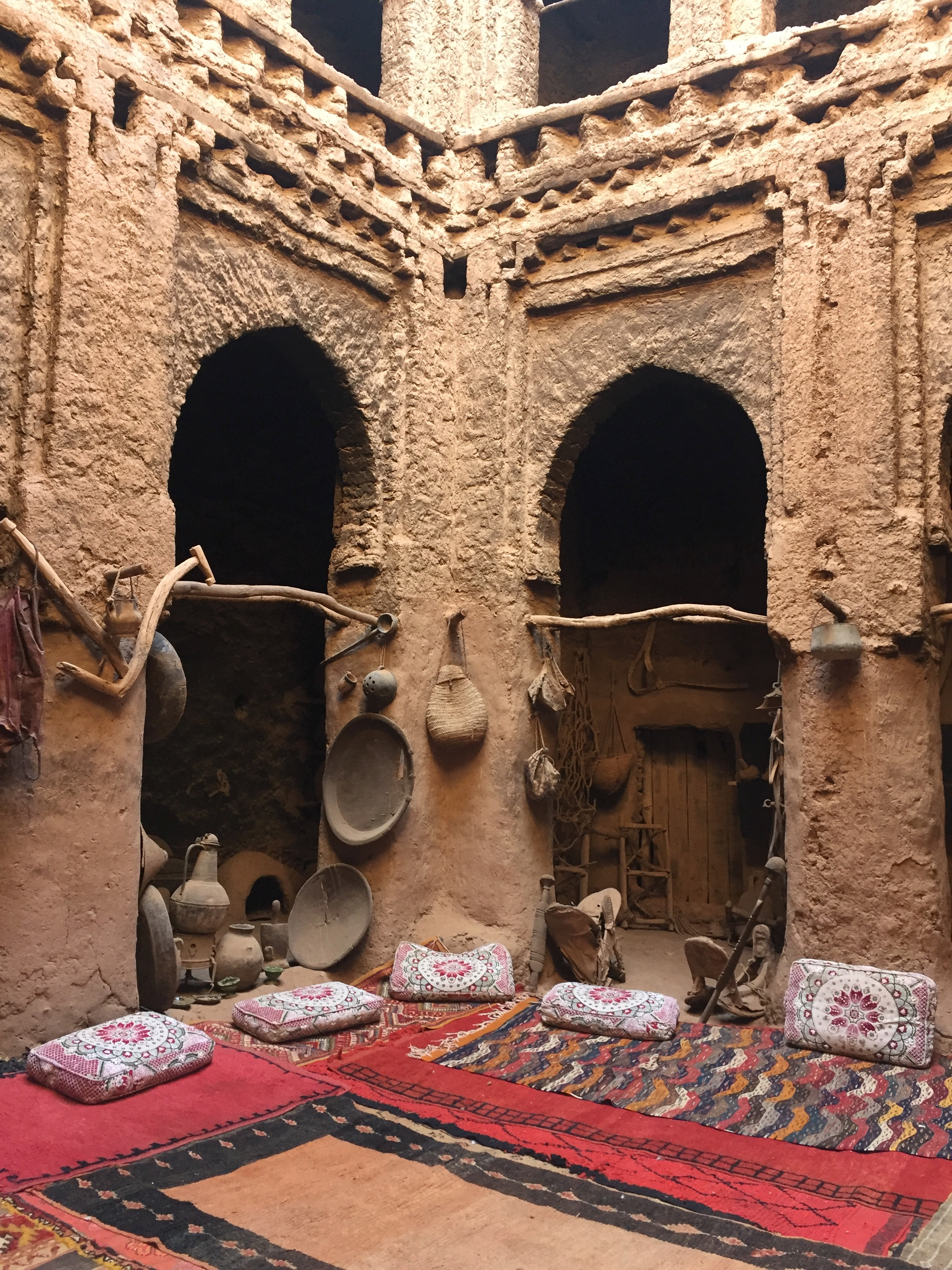
View of an ethnographic museum within the qasba of M'hamid.

In addition, M'Hamid was always a center for traveling nomads and caravans. Today the town is the starting point for tourist camel and 4x4 safaris into the desert.

The weekly open-air market (souk) is held on Monday.

== Townscape ==
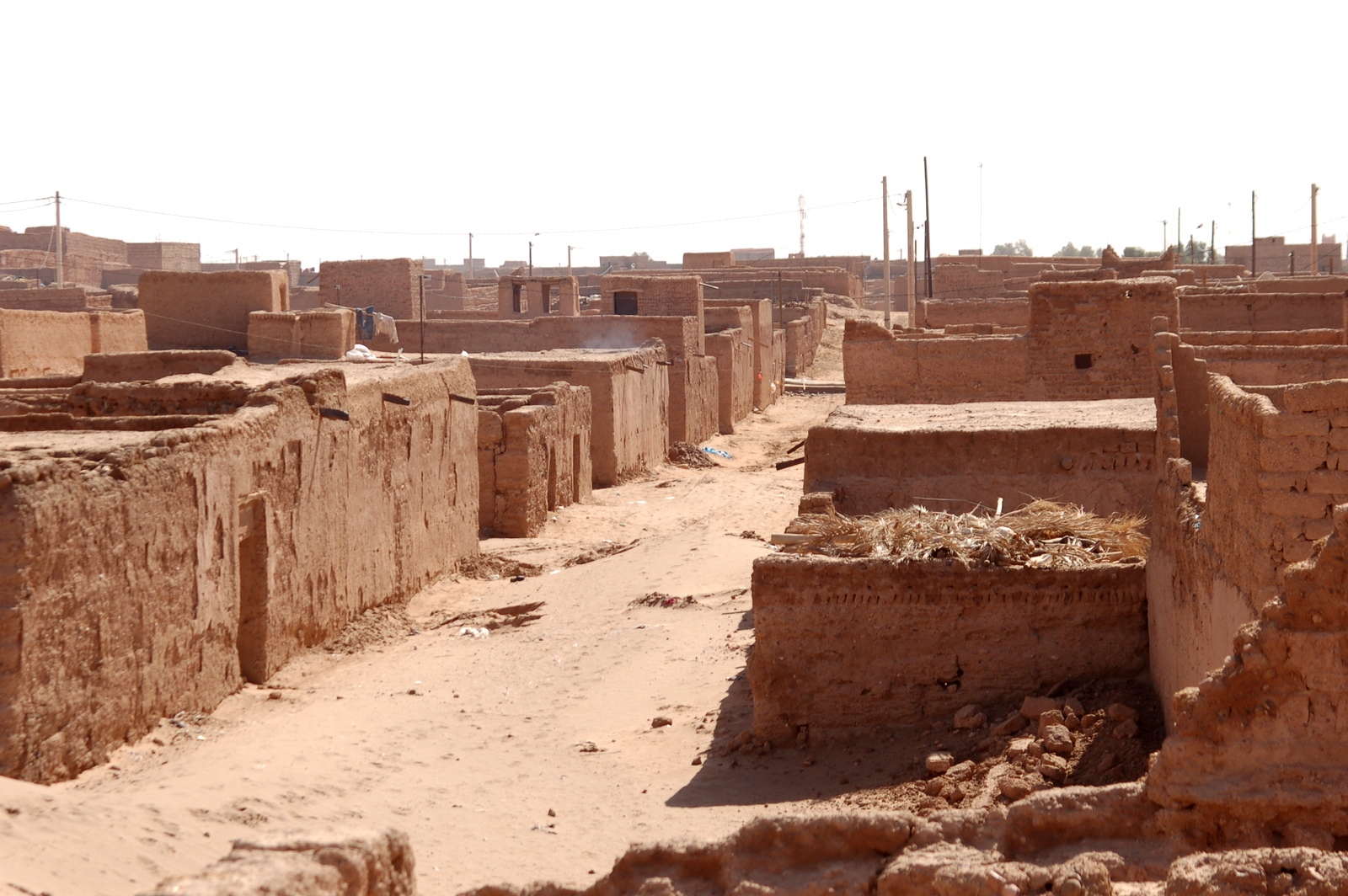
Decaying adobe buildings in a side street of M'Hamid

The original adobe buildings of M'Hamid are mostly dilapidated and only a few mostly poor families live in those. In recent decades new houses have been built in M'Hamid in the typical construction of the Moroccan South on concrete floors with walls of hollow concrete blocks which are painted bright red. Desert winds carry always masses of sand in the city.

== Festival Taragalte ==
Festival Taragalte, a three-day open-air cultural festival, is held annually in the dunes near M'Hamid El Ghizlane.

Apart from music, the festival showcases many aspects of nomadic culture: architectural heritage, flora and fauna, visual arts, environmental protection, among others. It includes local, national, and international performers, and performances include poetry, story-telling, song, music, and dance. There is also competitive sport, including nomadic hockey and a camel race, and conferences and round tables are held on a range of topics. Different themes are chosen each year.

Its 11th edition, in October 2022, took place after a hiatus of two years owing to the COVID-19 pandemic.

Since 2013, it has been involved in the Caravane culturelle de la paix (Cultural Caravan for Peace), a travelling festival that was planned as a temporary successor to the Malian Festival au Désert, after Timbuktu became too unsafe to hold it there after January 2012. The 2022 Festival Taragalte included the 9th stage of the Cultural Caravan for Peace,

The musical group Génération Taragalte, whose members are all from the town, named their band after the festival.

== Surroundings ==
Hidden in the palm oases of M'Hamid are seven old, now almost uninhabited, and decaying ksars. Approximately 50-60 km (about 30 to 40 miles) away lie the sand dunes of Erg Chigaga, sometimes more than 100 metres (330 ft) high, which are less often visited by tourists than those in Merzouga.
