= Poirt An Phiobaire =

Poirt an Phiobaire

Studio album by Paddy Keenan
- Released: 1983
- Genre: Irish Folk
- Label: Gael-Linn Records
- Producer: Nicky Ryan

Paddy Keenan chronology
Paddy Keenan	Poirt an Phiobaire	Ná Keen Affair

Poirt an Phiobaire is a 1983 solo release by uilleann piper and whistle player Paddy Keenan.

== Tracks ==
No.	Title	Writer(s)	Length
1.	"Poirt: Jigs (Condon's Frolics, the Eavesdropper)"	Traditional	3:16
2.	"Fonn Amhráin: The Factory Girl"	Traditional	2:49
3.	"Ril: Man of the House"	Traditional	2:17
4.	"Rileanna: The Maid Behind the Bar, O'Rourke's, Eilish Brogan"	Traditional	3:21
5.	"Rileanna: The Monaghan Twig, Collier's"	Traditional	3:02
6.	"Port: The Ballintore Jig"	Traditional	3:28
7.	"Fonn Mall, Ril: Marig AR Pollanton, Cahir's Kitchen"	Galorn, Keenan	5:37
8.	"Máirseáil Ui Neill/O'Neill'sMarch"	Traditional	2:45
9.	"Fonn Briotánach: Jezaique"	Traditional	2:21
10.	"Rileanna: The Green Gates, George White's Favourite"	Traditional	3:14
11.	"Fonn Mall: Cape Clear"	Traditional	3:14

== Musicians ==
Paddy Keenan : Uilleann Pipes, Tin Whistle
Arty McGlynn : Guitar
