= Génération Taragalte =

Moroccan musical group

Génération Taragalte is a musical group from Morocco, formed in 2012, playing electric rock and blues.

The group's five founding members all hail from M’hamid El Ghizlane (in Zagora Province), a village whose main industry is tourism. The idea of making music in their own way came to them after they attended a concert by the Tuareg group Tinariwen in 2009, at the Festival Taragalte, which is held annually in M'Hamid El Ghizlane.

They returned to Festival Taragalte in 2018, as performers, and they performed at Atlas Electronic that same year.

== Members ==
- Brahim - guitar, vocals
- Said - guitar, vocals
- Mostapha - bass, backing vocals
- Mohamed - percussion
- Khalifa - calebash, backing vocals
