= Discovery Gospel Choir =

- Also known as: Discovery
- Origin: Dublin, Ireland
- Genres: Gospel, World Music
- Instruments: Vocals
- Years active: 2004–present
- Website: Official website

Discovery Gospel Choir is an intercultural choir based in Dublin, Ireland. The choir was founded in 2004 as part of the Church of Ireland's 5-year Discovery Project - an initiative to welcome migrants and encourage social integration in Ireland.

In 2009 the Discovery Project ended and the choir developed into an inter-denominational, professional choir. ] At that time it was directed by Róisín Dexter and is partially supported by the Church of Ireland and Dublin City Council. The following year they released an album entitled Discovery: Live at the Pavilion, Dublin.

The choir’s motto is, "Discover beauty in everyone".

By 2022, the director was Cathy McEvoy. In 2023, they are based at Dublin's Sts. George and Thomas Church, which was the only state-built Church of Ireland parish church, and had over 30 members.

== Awards ==
- RTE Lyric FM/ Waltons World Music Competition 2010
- Dublin Gospel Music Festival Hall of Fame 2011
