= Tartit =

Malian band

- Origin: Tombouctou Region, Mali
- Genres: Desert blues
- Years active: 1992-present
- Label: Crammed Discs
- Spinoffs: Imharhan
- Past members: Mohammed Issa

Tartit (meaning "union") are a band from the Tombouctou Region of Mali. The group consists of five women and four men, all of whom are Tamasheq-speaking Tuareg. They formed in 1992 in a refugee camp in Mauritania. Imharhan, an expanded group that includes current and former Tartit members, incorporates electric instruments and cross-cultural experiments into their music.

== History ==
In 1995, Tartit performed their debut concert at the MASA Trade Fair for African Arts in Abidjan, Côte d'Ivoire. In the same year they were invited to the Festival of Women's Voices in Liège, Belgium. Tartit toured Europe in 1998 and then in 2000 toured North America. At the WOMAD Festival in Seattle, after performing their own set, the group joined fellow Malians Ali Farka Touré and Afel Bocoum on stage. In 2003 they appeared at the Festival in the Desert, where they again played with Touré and Bocoum, and also joined Tinariwen, Robert Plant, Oumou Sangaré, Lo'Jo and Baba Salah. Tartit has collaborated with other musicians, such as Susan McKeown (on her album Sweet Liberty), and their songs have been included on compilations such as, Rèves d'Oasis: Desert Blues.

Tartit released their first album, Amazagh, in 1997. They became better-known with the release of their second album, Ichchila, recorded in 2000. In 2006, the group released their third album, Abacabok.

To contribute actively to the development of their region, the band also formed a United Nations-recognized association dedicated to preserving and raising awareness of Malian music and culture. The association, likewise, develops schools for children and economic opportunities for women.

Tartit's compositions include ballads and call-and-response songs. Most of Tartit's songs are simply structured. The female members of the band play the traditional instruments, imzad and tende, and are supplemented by the teherdent ngoni and/or electric guitar played by the men. To these instruments are added chants and percussive handclaps. The result is a sort of desert blues.

In February 2013, Freemuse reported that Tartit had fled the Timbuktu area due to the Northern Mali conflict. Leader Fadimata Walett Oumar (known as "Disco") fled to Ouagadougou, Burkina Faso while other members went to Bobo-Dioulasso or to Mauritania. This complicated efforts to perform at European concerts during summer 2012; guitarist Mohammed Issa was unable to secure a visa while living in Mauritania and could not appear with the group.

Mohammed Issa formed an affiliated group, Imharhan. Banning Eyre, writing for Afropop Worldwide, has noted that "with a more electric, 'modern' sound, Imharhan kind of splits the difference between Tartit and Tinariwen, with the women of Tartit participating with vocals and dance." In July and August 2013, Tartit and Imharhan performed throughout North America with singer-guitarist Mamadou Kelly as the Festival au Desert - Caravan for Peace.

== Band members ==
- Fadimata Walett Oumar ("Disco") - vocals, tinde drum
- Walett Oumar Zeinabou - vocals, tinde drum
- Mama Walett Amoumine - vocals, tinde drum
- Fadimata W. Mohamedun (Fatma) - vocals, tinde drum
- Tafa Al Hosseini - vocals, imzad
- Mohamed Issa ag Oumar - lead electric guitar, vocals
- Ag Mohamed Idwal - 4-string teherdent lute, guitar
- Amanou - 3-string tehardent lute, guitar, vocals
- Mossa Ag Mohamed - vocals

== Discography ==
Albums

- Amazagh (1997), Fontimusical
- Ichichila (2000)
- Abacabok (2006), Crammed Discs
- Tartit: Amankor/ The exile (2019), World Music Network

Contributing artist

- The Rough Guide To Desert Blues (2010), World Music Network
