= Hamada =

Desert landscape with mostly rock instead of sand

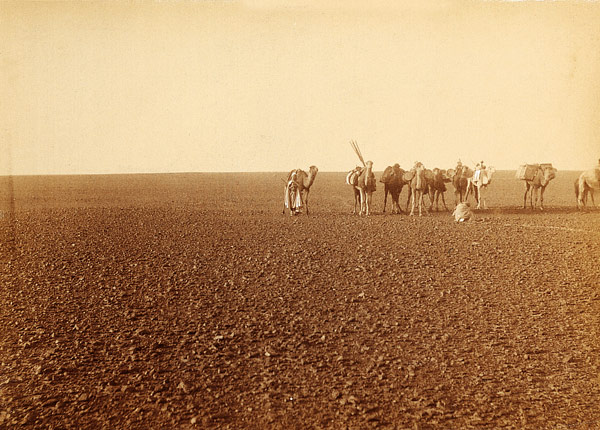
Hamada plateau at Tademaït, Algeria. Photograph by French explorer Fernand Foureau during his trans-Saharan journey in 1890.

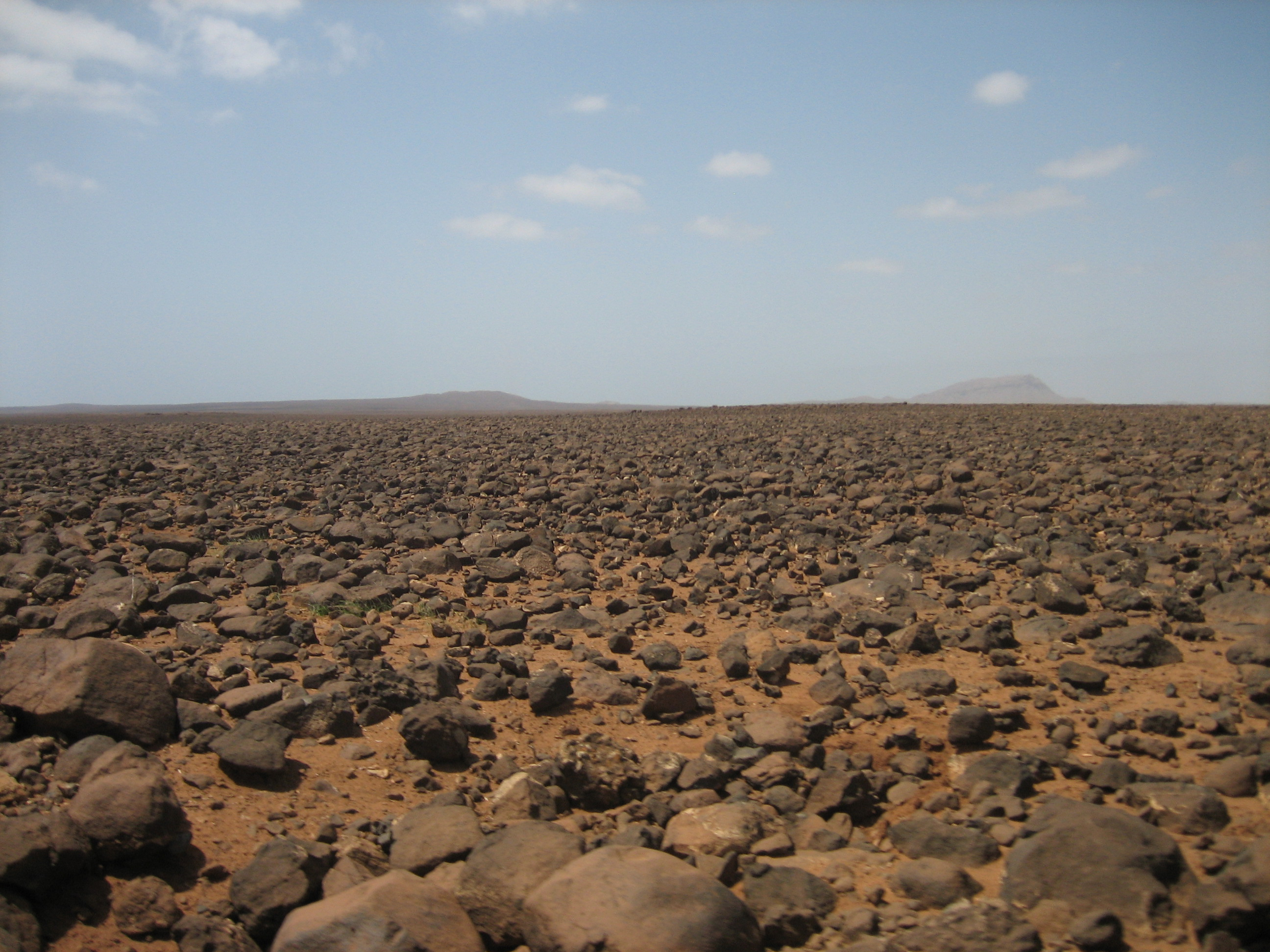
Hamada in the interior of the Cape Verde island of Boa Vista.

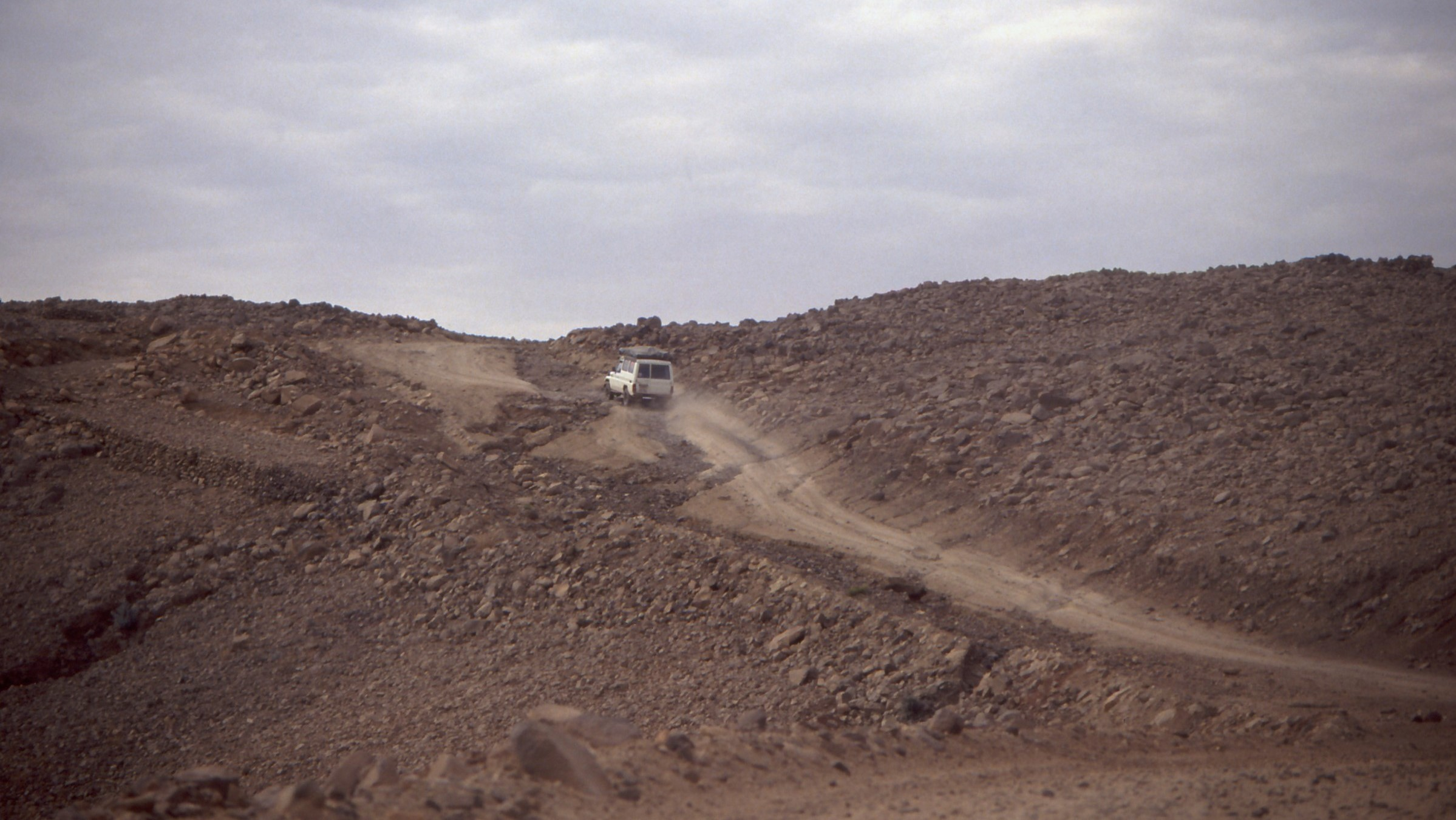
Hamada desert near the Hoggar Mountains in Algeria.

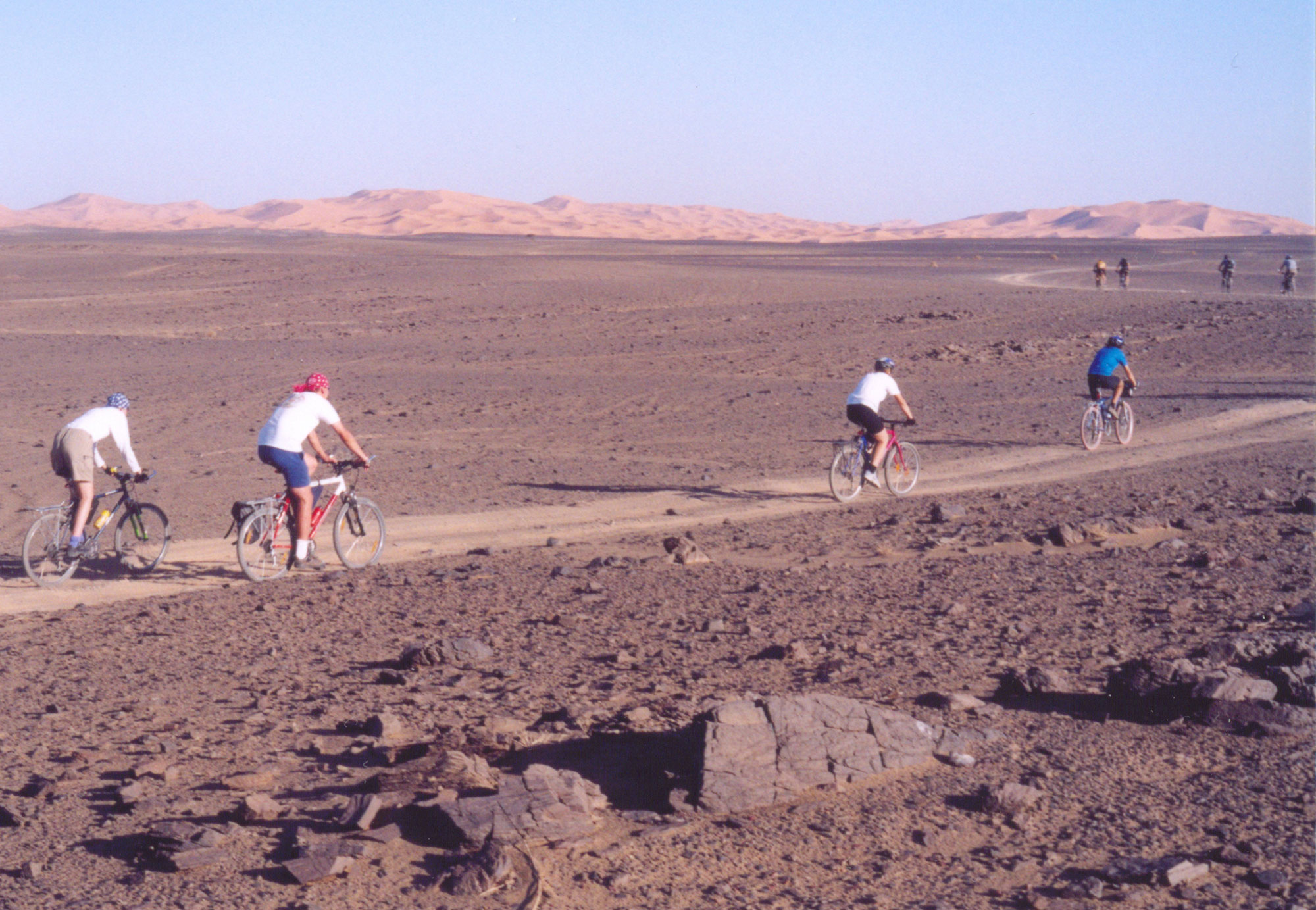
Cyclists ride over hamada to the Erg Chebbi dunes, Morocco.

A hamada (Arabic: حمادة, ḥammāda) is a type of desert landscape consisting of high, largely barren, hard rocky (basalt) plateaus, where most of the sand has been removed by deflation. The majority of the Sahara is hamada. Other examples are Negev desert in Israel and the Tinrhert plateau in Algeria.

== Formation ==
Hamadas are produced by the wind, which removes the fine products of weathering, an aeolian process known as deflation. The finer-grained products are taken away in suspension. At the same time, the sand is removed through saltation and surface creep, leaving behind a landscape of gravel, boulders and bare rock.

== Related landforms ==
Hamada is related to desert pavement (known variously as reg, serir, gibber, or saï), which occurs as stony plains or depressions covered with gravels or boulders rather than as highland plateaus.

Hamadas contrast with ergs, which are large areas of shifting sand dunes.
