= Merzouga =

Merzouga مرزوقة ⵎⵔⵣⵓⴳⴰ
- Interactive map of Merzouga
- Coordinates: 31°5′57″N 4°0′42″W
- Country: Morocco
- Region: Drâa-Tafilalet
- Province: Errachidia
- Time zone: UTC+0 (GMT)

Merzouga (Berber languages: ⵎⵔⵣⵓⴳⴰ, Arabic: مرزوقة) is a village in Errachidia Province, Drâa-Tafilalet, Morocco. The nearby Erg Chebbi dunes are among the tallest in the Sahara desert and a major tourist destination in the region.

It is located about 35 kilometres (22 mi) southeast of Rissani, about 55 kilometres (34 mi) from Erfoud, and about 50 kilometres (31 mi) from the Algerian border. Some of the other villages near the dunes are Hassilabied (4 km or 2 1/2 mi away), Tanamoust (3 km or 2 mi away), Takoujt (1.5 km or 1 mi away), Khamlia (7 km or 4 1/2 mi away), and Tisserdmine (15 km or 9 mi away).

== History ==
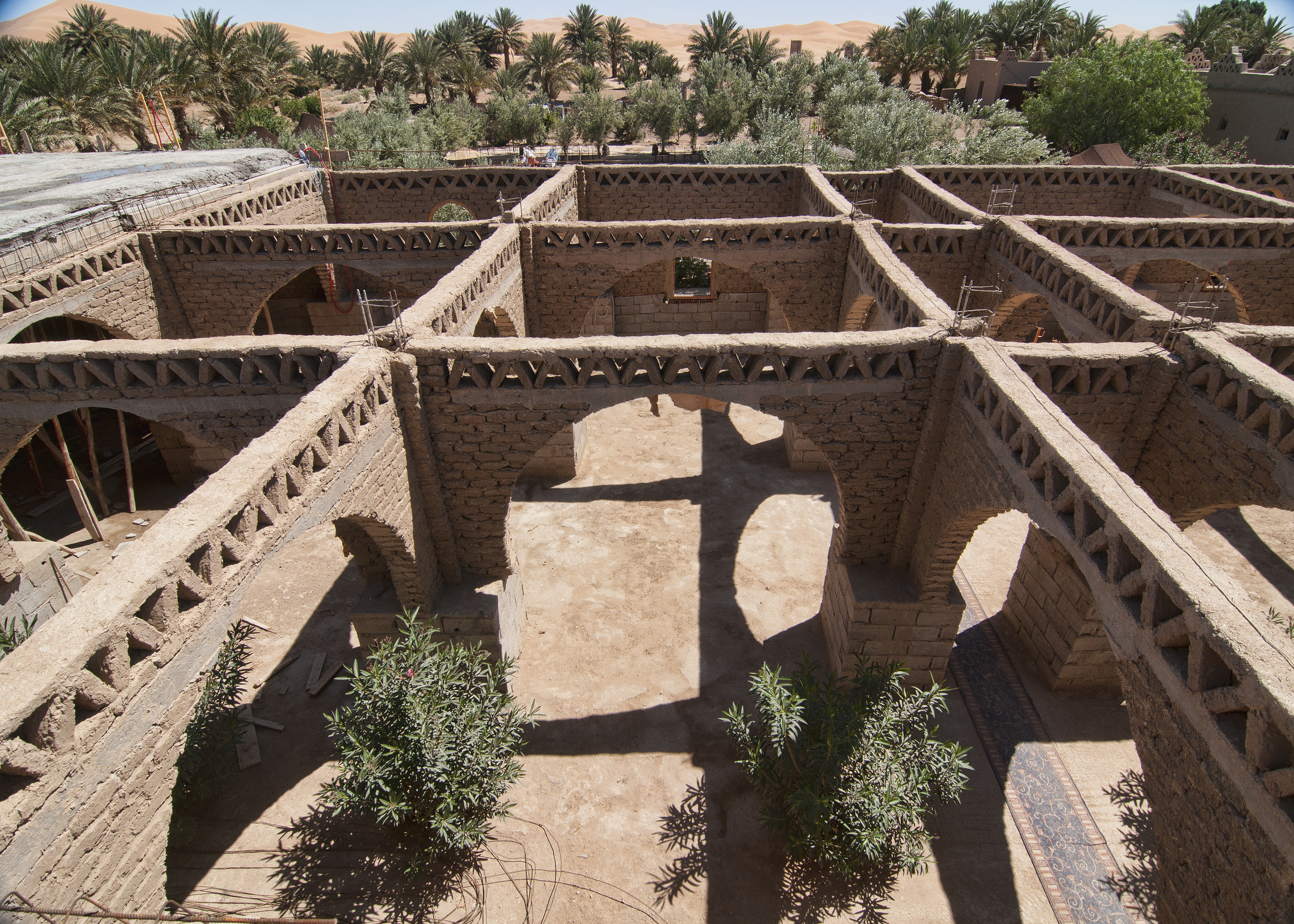
Adobe Arches in Merzouga

Approximately 9,000 to 10,000 years ago, the region was likely a tropical jungle, coinciding with a period when the Sahara Desert was characterized by abundant vegetation and lakes.

Merzouga was an uninhabited oasis that later became a transit point for merchants heading to Timbuktu. It also became a pilgrimage destination for the nomads of the Ait Atta tribes and eventually a tourist destination.

During French colonial rule, fortifications were built by troops of the French Foreign Legion after the battles of Taflalet, which occurred between 1916 and 1932.

On 26 May 2006, during the night, Merzouga experienced flash floods that caused severe damage to buildings, cars, and the traditional irrigation system. The flood left 1,200 people displaced and three dead. Animals also died in their collapsed stables.

"The flood damages were significant, with the destruction of 140 houses and hotels, deterioration of Taouz– Merzouga road and of the ONEP (National Agency for drinking water and sanitation) water supply pipe of Merzouga villages "

Due to climate change, extreme weather events of flooding have been more commonplace. In 2024, the seasonal Yasmina Lake re-formed.

The Merzouga Rally motorsport race is held since 2010.

== Environmental concerns ==
Merzouga faces several environmental challenges, particularly related to tourism and waste management. The increase in visitors has led to concerns about littering in the dunes and improper waste disposal, which impacts the region's fragile ecosystem. Local authorities have taken measures to regulate tourism activities, including closing unlicensed desert camps in 2019 due to concerns over waste disposal, water usage, and infrastructure sustainability. These closures sparked debate among local communities, as tourism is a significant part of the area's economy.

The region has also experienced rare environmental events, such as unexpected flooding. In October 2024, heavy rainfall led to the formation of temporary lakes in normally dry areas, a phenomenon not observed in decades.

== Gallery ==
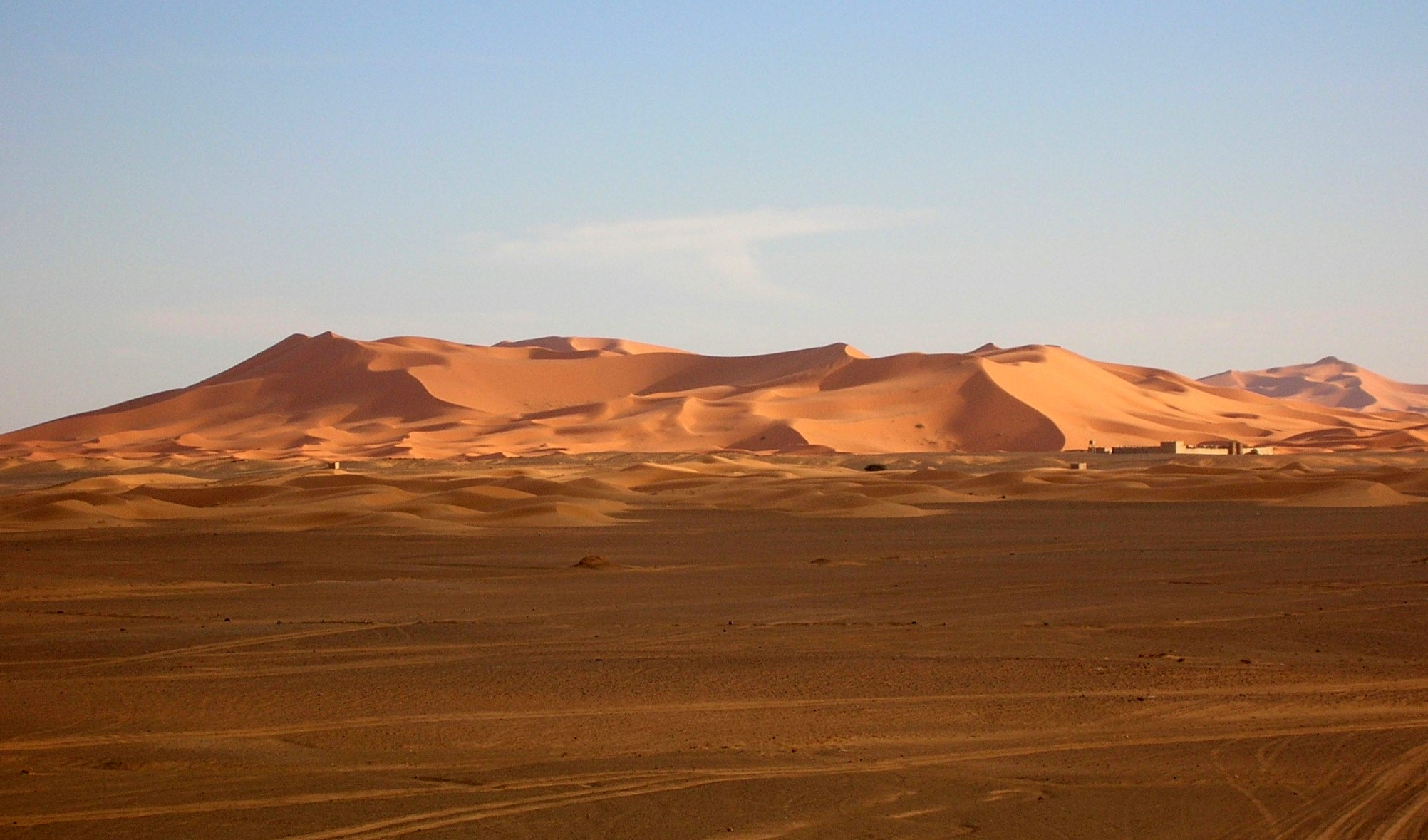

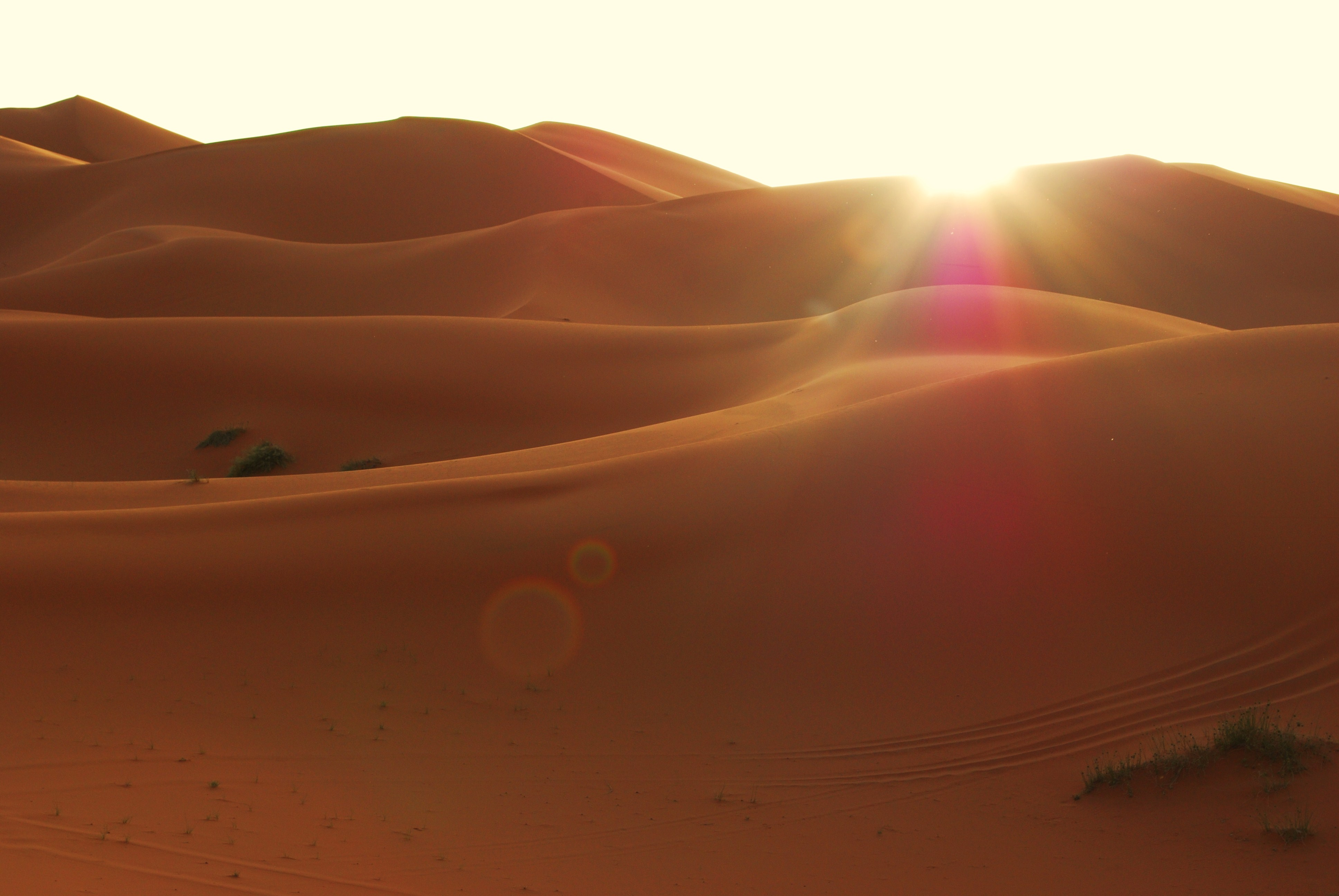

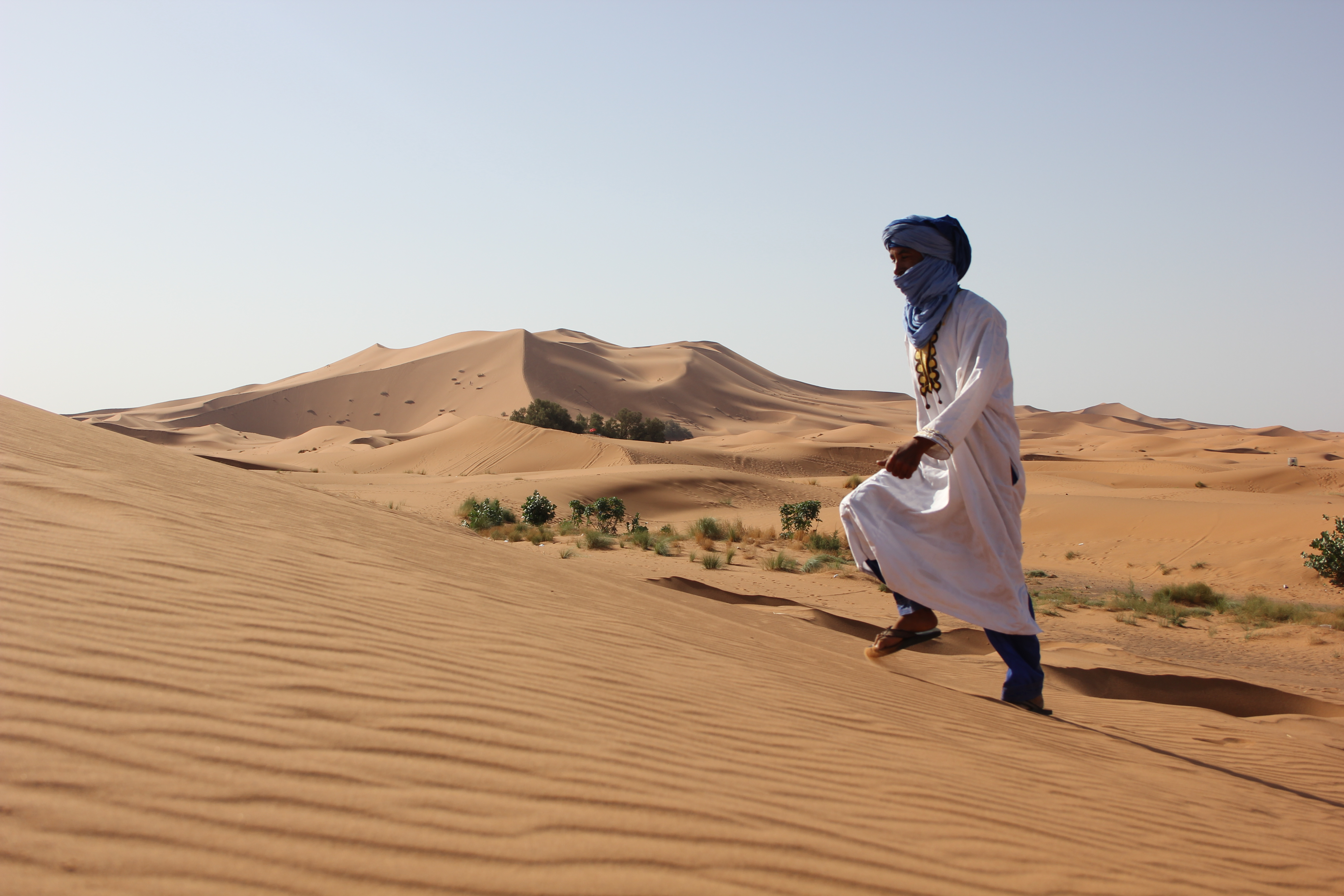

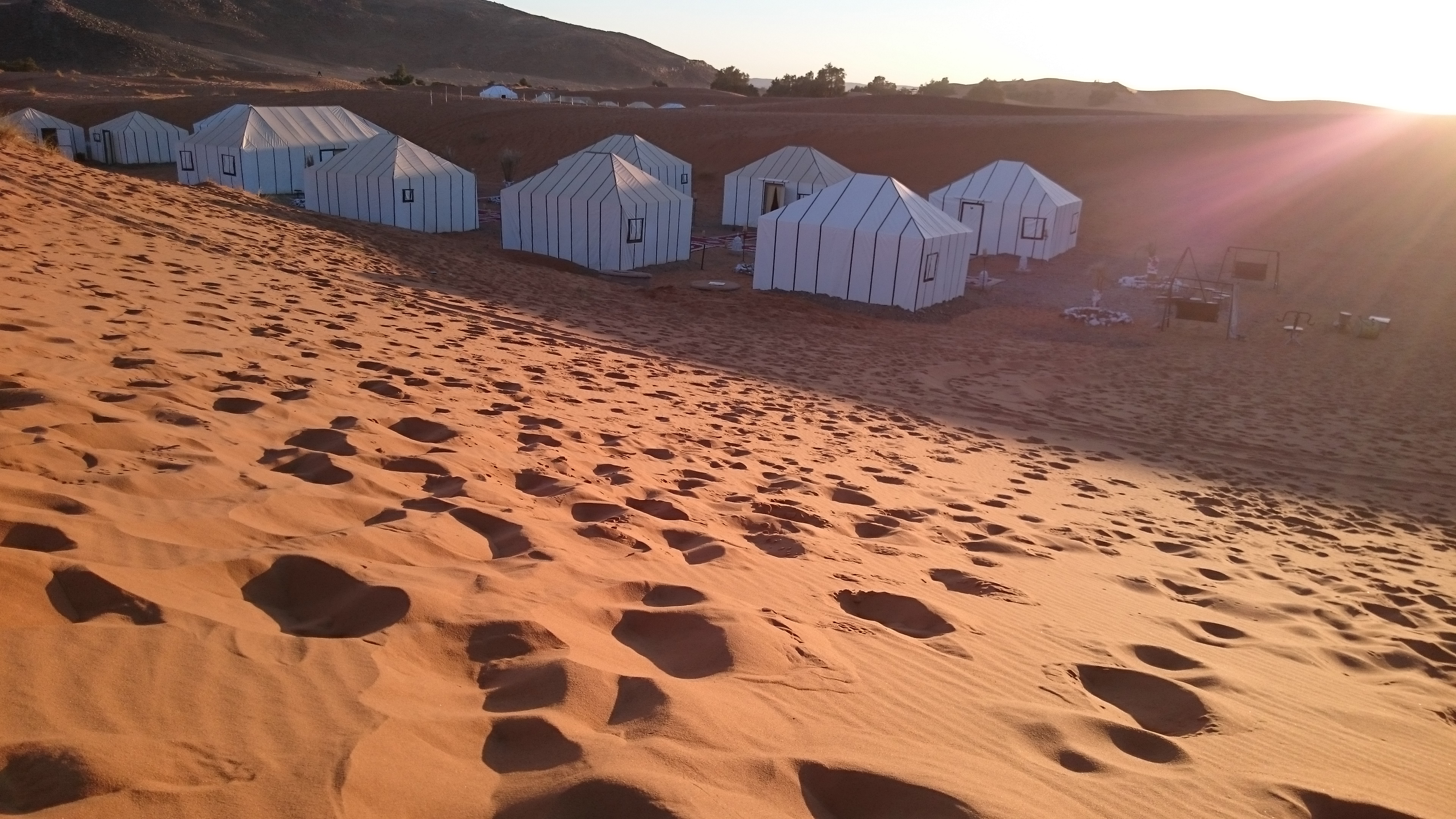

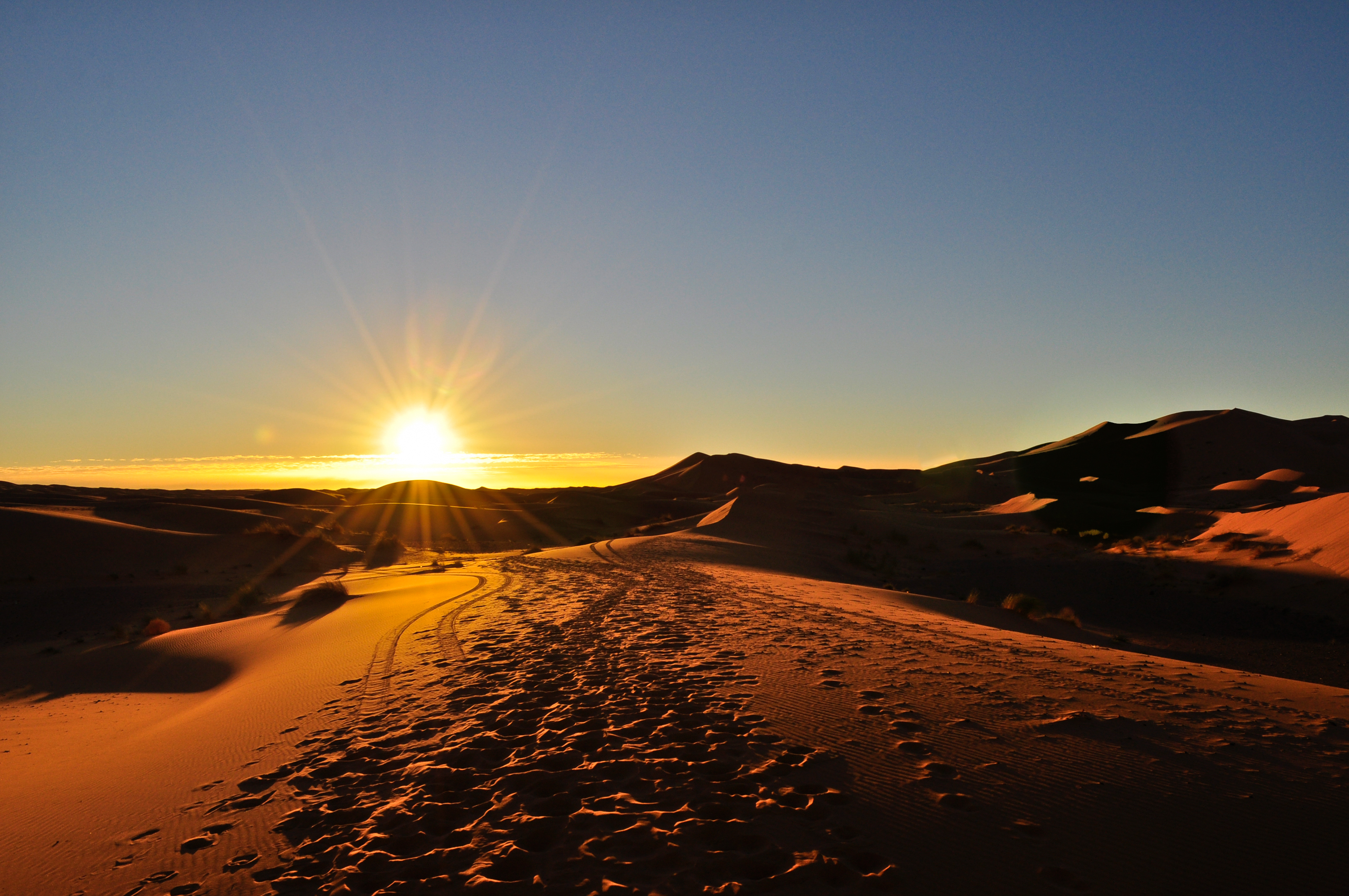

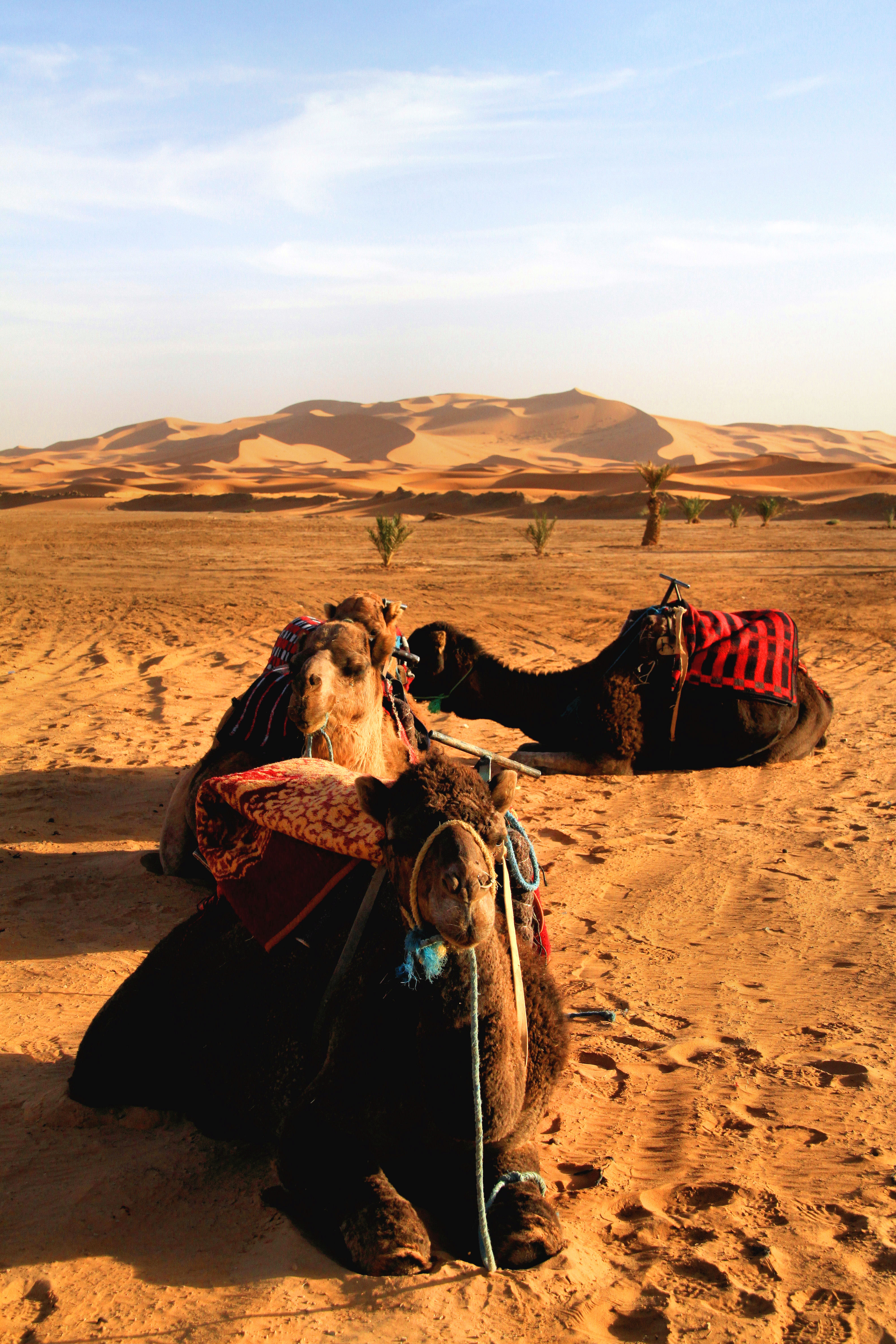

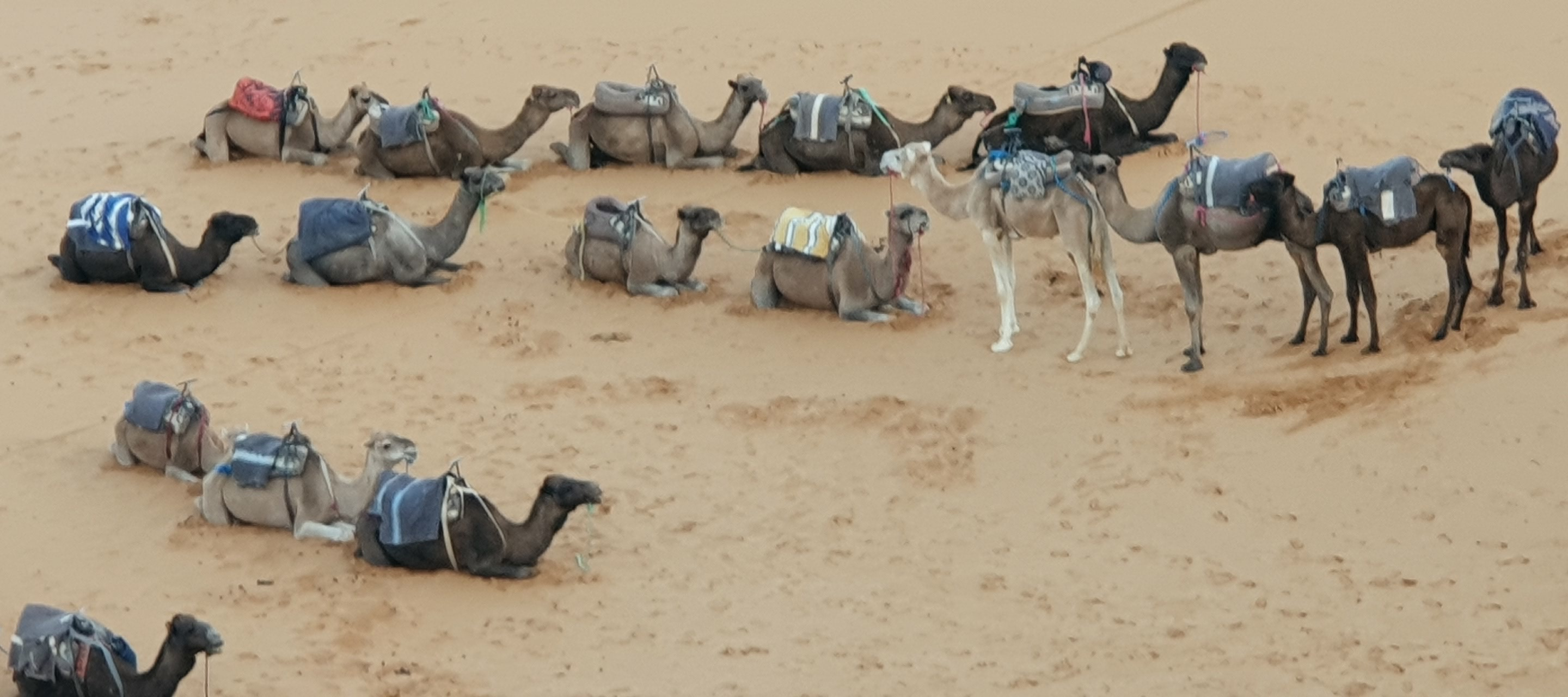

== See also ==
- Sahara
- Sahara Desert
- African humid period
- Morocco
