= Khamlia =

Coordinates: 31.0351°N 4.0073°W

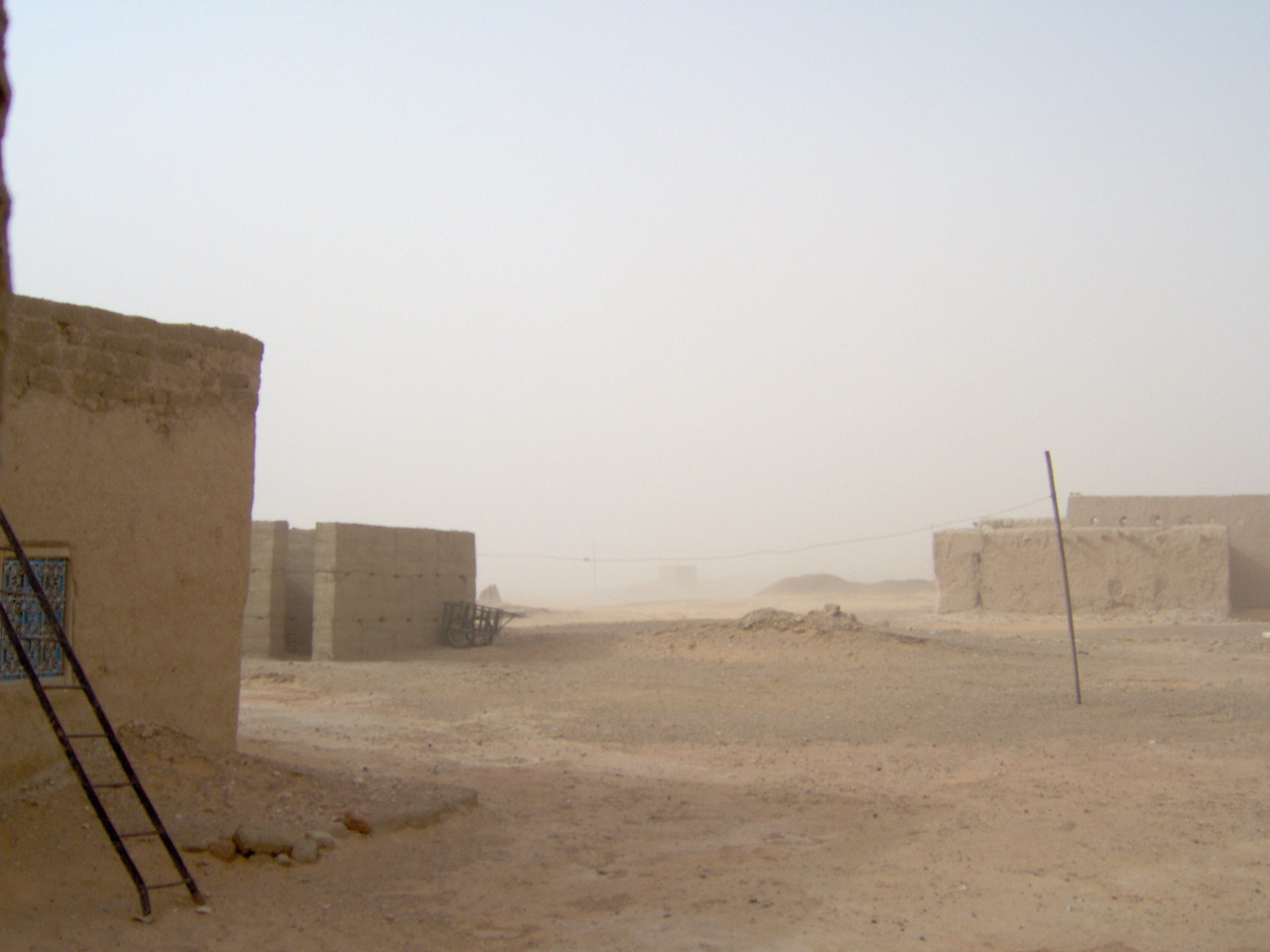
Khamlia in 2007

Khamlia is small village located on the edge of sand dunes of Erg Chebbi in southeast Morocco near the Algerian border. The village is also called the southern gateway to the Sahara.

== Culture ==
=== Festival of Gnawa ===
In Khamlia Village every summer there is held a desert festival called Gnawa, also known as Sadaka. Well-attended over three nights, its focus is an unceasing "trance-like" music believed to bring health to the sick and bestow blessings.

== See also ==
- Merzouga
