= Festival au Désert =

Annual music festival in Mali

Coordinates: 20.0283°N 3.1974°W

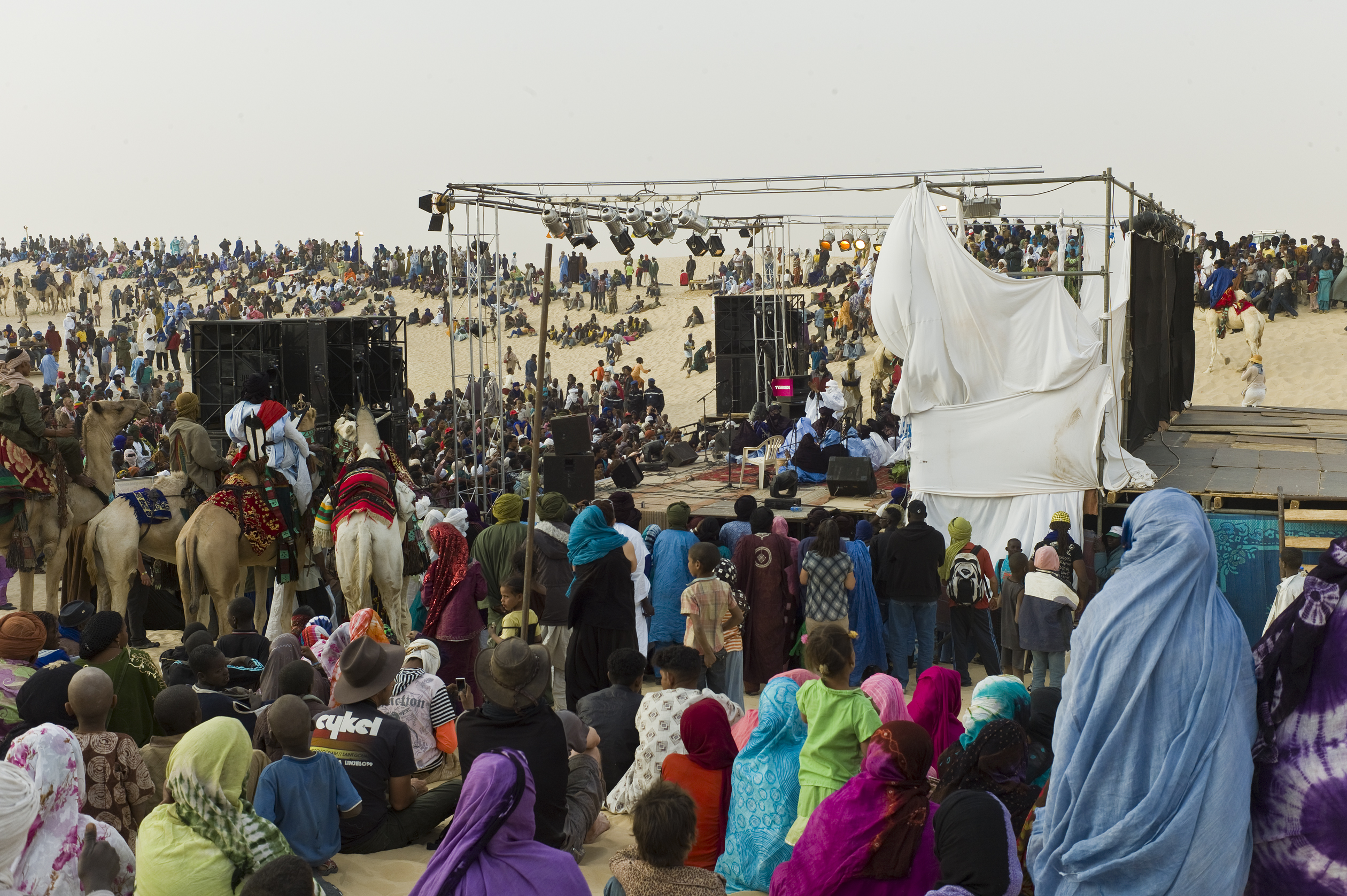
Audience at the festival near Timbuktu, Mali, 2012.

The Festival au désert (Festival in the Desert) was an annual concert in Mali, showcasing traditional Tuareg music as well as music from around the world between 2001 and 2012. It was founded and directed by Manny Ansar, and attracted thousands of visitors, bringing a huge boost to the economy.

The first festival took place in 2001 in Tin Essako, then in Tessalit in 2002, and in Essakane from 2003 to 2009. From 2010 to 2012 it was held on the outskirts of Timbuktu. After an incursion of Timbuktu by Islamist militants in 2012, the festival was postponed, and has not been held since then since then due to security concerns.

Several film documentaries have been made about or at the festival. These include Le Festival au Désert (2004), Dambé: The Mali Project (2008), The Last Song Before the War (2013), and Woodstock in Timbuktu (2013). The album Festival au Desert Live from Timbuktu (2013) has performances from the 2012 festival.

From 2013, a collaborative venture known "Caravane culturelle de la paix" has toured various countries. This was created by Ansar along with the directors of two other festivals, the Malian Festival sur le Niger, and the Moroccan Festival Taragalte.

== History ==
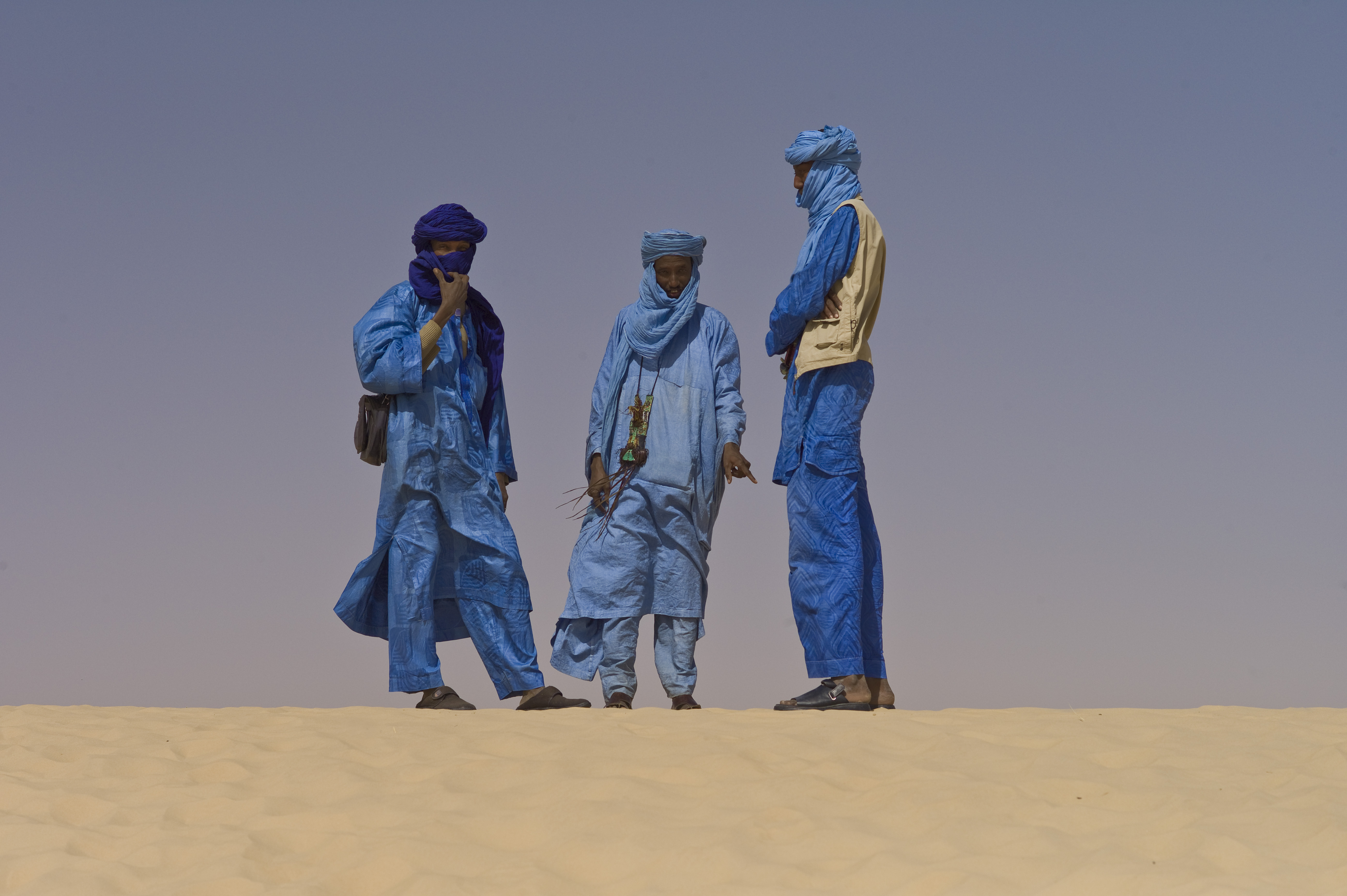
Tuareg people at the 2012 festival

The first festival took place in Tin Essako in January 2001. It was an initiative created by Manny Ansar, manager of Tuareg band Tinariwen, who played at the festival, along with the band Lo'Jo, who co-organised the festival. Around 500 to 600 people attended that first festival. The Festival au Désert was the first such festival in North Africa. It claimed (in what ethnomusicologist Marta Amico suggested were paternalistic terms, promoting tourism in an impoverished region) that it continued a long tradition of traditional Tuareg feasts that promoted musical and social exchange. This tradition, known as the Takoubelt in Kidal and Temakannit in Timbuktu, was an annual meeting of Tuareg tribes of the region, where they played and shared music as well as discussing problems and resolving conflicts. However the Festival au Désert aimed to bridge the gap between tradition and modernity, and to broaden understanding of local customs among the international community.

In 2002 the festival was held in Tessalit, in the Kidal region of North-Eastern Mali. From 2003 until 2009 the festival was held in Essakane, 65 km (40 mi) from Timbuktu, but because of security issues, from 2010 the festival was held on the outskirts of Timbuktu.

After two years of being held in Kidal, Ansar approached Ali Farka Touré, who was very supportive of having the festival run in Timbuktu. He said that he had always wanted to bring people home, but did not know how to do that, and that now that this festival had been organised, he would support it; he would be their "godfather". He started performing at the festival, bringing in a lot of his fans, more visitors, tourists, and journalists. He performed the closing concert every year from 2003 until 2006 (he died later that year).

After three years, the festival had grown to attract an audience of over 5,000, with more than 50 journalists. The festival had been reported in the overseas press, and big name musicians such as Robert Plant and Bono (of U2 fame) became interested. Several offered to play for free.

The line-up for the 2012 festival included Bono, Bassekou Kouyate, and Tinariwen, who performed together on stage, and Khaira Arby. Together they sang "Vive le Mali, vive la paix, vive la musique". Other performers included Tartit, the Ali Farka Touré Allstars, Samba Touré, Tamnana, Baba Djire, and Douma Maïga. Ansar remained the director of the festival.

The festival had grown to attract thousands of visitors, and was a huge source of income for the local people.

Shortly after the January 2012 festival, the MNLA launched the Azawadi rebellion, an early stage of the Northern Mali conflict, resulting in the postponement of the 2013 festival. Islamist rebels banned artistic expression, which included the festival.

The festival has continued to be postponed due to security concerns in the region. An attempt was made to re-launch it in 2015, but it was not successful.

== Films and recordings ==
An audio recording of the 2012 edition Festival au Desert Live from Timbuktu was released in 2013 with performances by 18 artists.

A French-language documentary entitled Le Festival au Désert (2004) was filmed at the 2003 festival. Performers include Tartit, Oumou Sangaré, Lo'Jo, Tinariwen, Robert Plant with Justin Adams, Blackfire, Khaira Arby and her band, Django, and Ali Farka Touré. The DVD contains English subtitles, and an audio CD of the concert, Festival in the Desert, was also released.

The documentary Dambé: The Mali Project (2008) tells the story of a cross-cultural musical adventure over 3000 miles by two Irish musicians, that features performances from the Festival au désert.

Other documentary films made about the Festival are The Last Song Before the War (2013) and Woodstock in Timbuktu (2013).

== Awards ==
In 2013 the Festival of the Desert was awarded the Freemuse Award, which was accepted by Ansar. The award, given by Freemuse, recognises an individual or organisation that "has worked for freedom of musical expression in a remarkable way"

== Manny Ansar ==
Festival founder Mohamed Aly "Manny" Ansar is a Tuareg man, whose family were nomads. He gained a master's degree in international public law, and worked for many years in humanitarian projects before following his passion, music. In 1993 he took on the job of managing the Tuareg band Tinariwen, soon afterwards arranging recording sessions at ORTM, the Malian national broadcaster, which produced Tinariwen's second album.

In July 2013 he spoke at the World Justice Forum IV, held by the World Justice Project at The Hague, Netherlands.

== Caravane culturelle de la paix ==
After the last festival in 2012, Ansar, along with friends in Mali, in refugee camps in Burkino Faso, and others abroad, started planning the "Caravane culturelle de la paix" (Cultural Caravan for Peace), which was to be a multi-ethnic touring festival which would promote peace and harmony through music and talks. It aims to continue cooperation of peoples of the Sahel and Saharan regions, encouraging dialogue, solidarity and peace. Ansar sees the festival as analogous to the role of Griots in Tuareg society. They are an ethnic group, which had the main responsibility for keeping stories of the individual tribes and families alive in the oral tradition, with the narrative accompanied by a musical instrument. It was also their role settle disputes and act as mediator in case of conflicts. Respect for the Griot meant that they could approach both parties without being attacked, and initiate peace negotiations between the hostile parties.

The directors of the Malian Festival sur le Niger (Mamou Daffe, a Bambara man from Ségou) and the Moroccan Festival Taragalte (Halim Sbaï, an Arab) were keen to collaborate with Ansar (who is Tuareg). In 2013 the first Caravane concert was held at the refugee camp in Burkina Faso, and in July and August 2013, Tartit, Imharhan, and Mamadou Kelly toured throughout North America. The Caravane's official launch took place in November 2013. In subsequent years the Caravane culturelle de la paix was held in Ségou and Mopti in Mali, at Festival Taragalte in Morocco (held in the dunes near M'Hamid El Ghizlane), at refugee camps in Burkina Faso, Niger, and Mauritania, where a lot of Malians are living; and internationally.

The Sahel Sahara Band performs at the Caravane, carrying a message of peace.

In 2017, a planned concert in Timbuktu had to be cancelled at the last minute as it was deemed too risky. After this, there were four evening concerts and two conferences scheduled in three Malian cities, starting at the Festival sur le Niger at Ségou before travelling to Sikasso to perform a stadium concert; then on to the Institut français in Bamako, before a big outdoor concert on the banks of the River Niger in Bamako. It would then go on to perform outside of Mali, including Europe, and lastly, in the autumn, the Festival Taragalte in Morocco. On 6 May 2017, the band Terakaft (which included "Diarra", aka Liya Ag Ablil, guitarist and founding member of Tinariwen), and the Ali Farka Touré Band played at the Grace Rainey Rogers Auditorium at the Metropolitan Museum of Art in New York City. Before the show, there was a panel discussion with Professor Cynthia Schneider, Ansar, and two members of the Touré band.

In 2022, the 9th edition of the Caravane culturelle de la paix was held at Festival Taragalte, after being held at Ségou and a desert festival at Ag'na in Mali.
