= Hassilabied =

Village in Morocco

Coordinates: 31.1344°N 4.0261°W

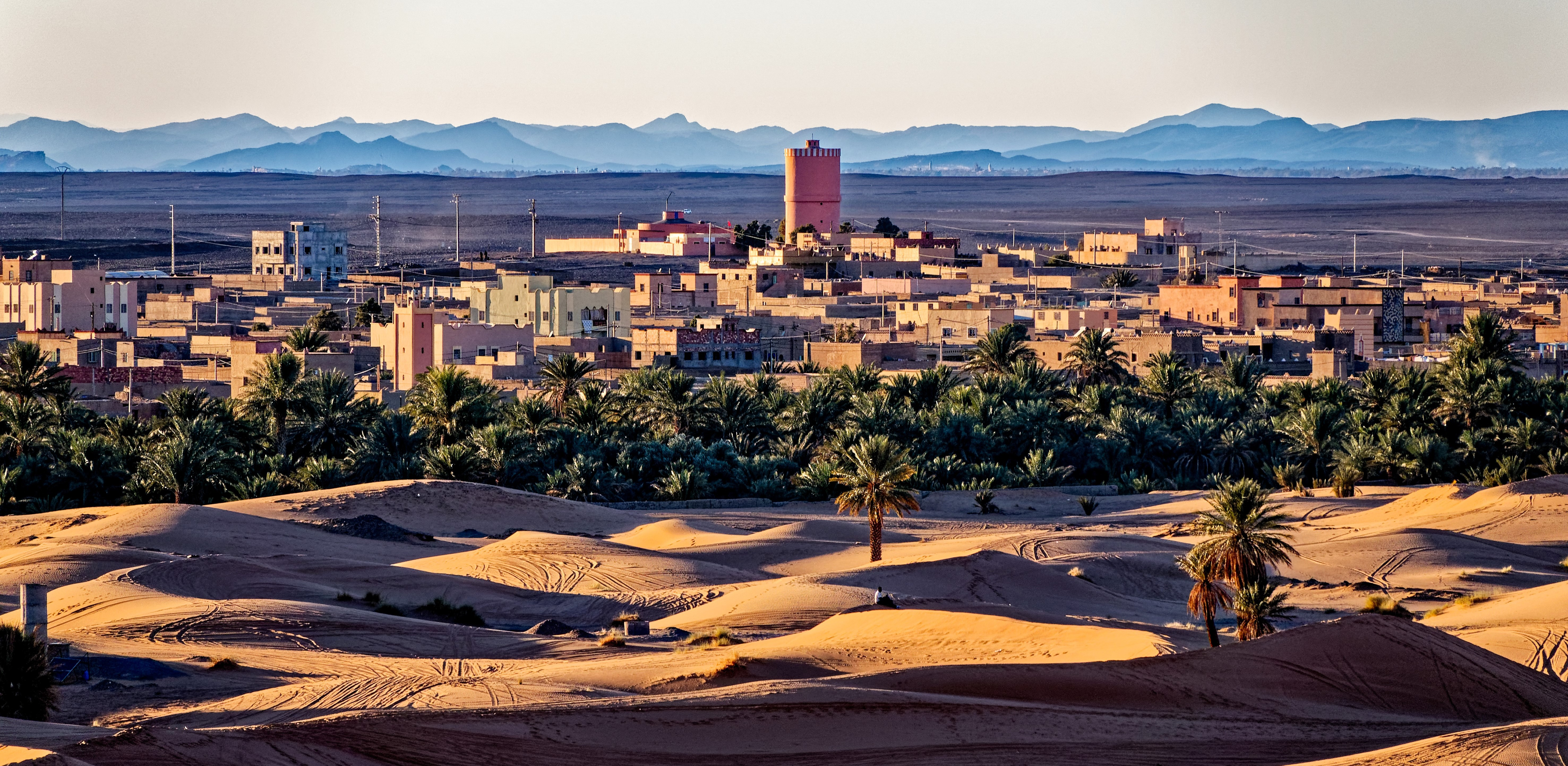
Hassilabied on the edge of the Sahara

Hassilabied is a village in the Sahara Desert in Morocco, 5 km north of Merzouga. Most people are here to take a camel safari into the dunes of Erg Chebbi, and to get a taste of remote (tourism-influenced) Berber life.

== Climate ==
Winter months (November to February) are cool, with daily high temperatures only slightly over 10 °C, and cold nights. Spring until April is pleasant, with temperatures from 25 °C up to 30 °C in the afternoons, and with cool nights. Summer months are hot. In winter and spring there is occasional short rain or drizzle (a couple of days per month, on average), but heavy rain is unusual.
