= Erg Chebbi =

Broad, flat area of desert in Morocco

Erg Chebbi عرق الشبي ⴻⵔⴳ ⵛⴱⵉ
- Erg
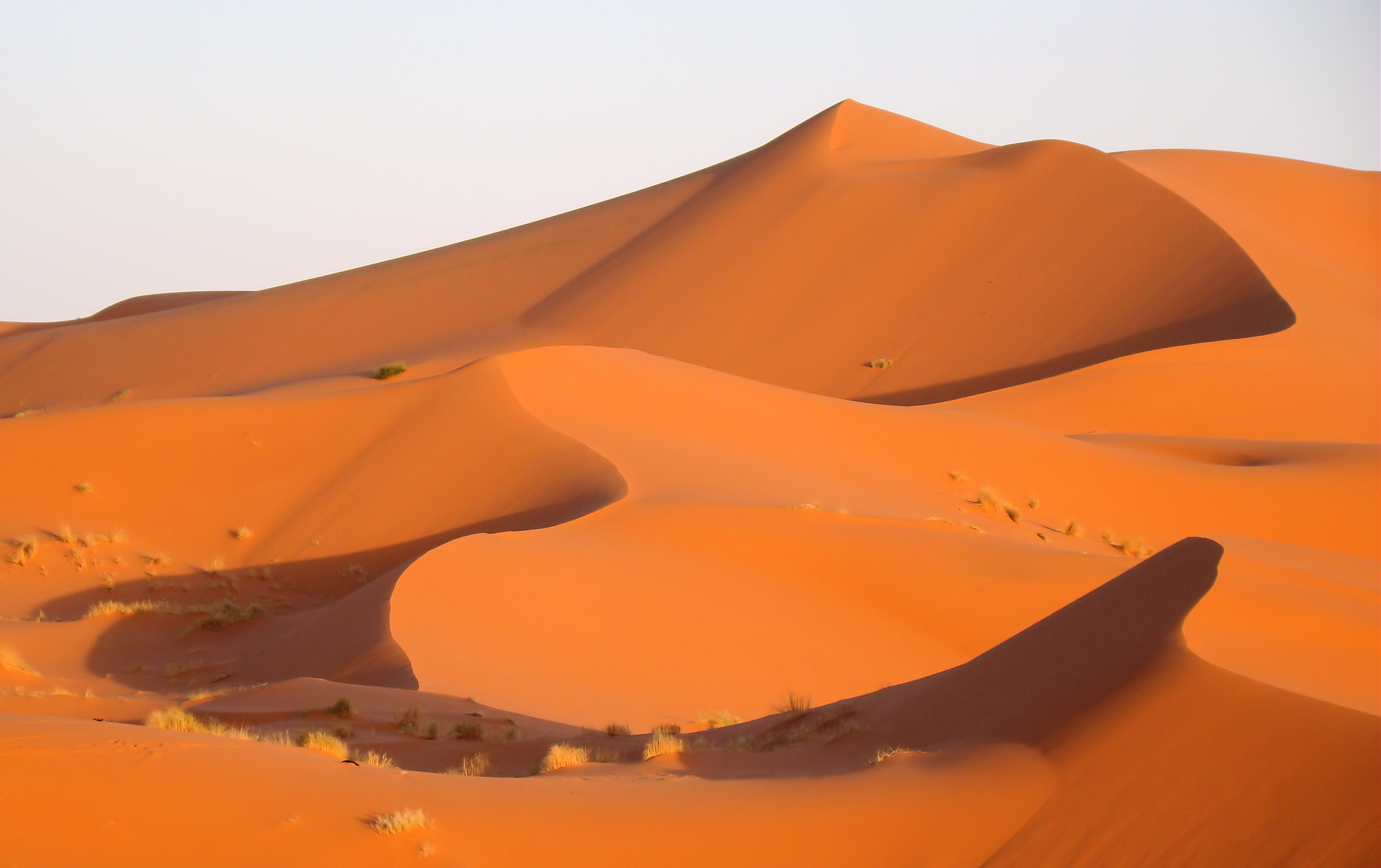
- Landscape of the Erg Chebbi at sunset

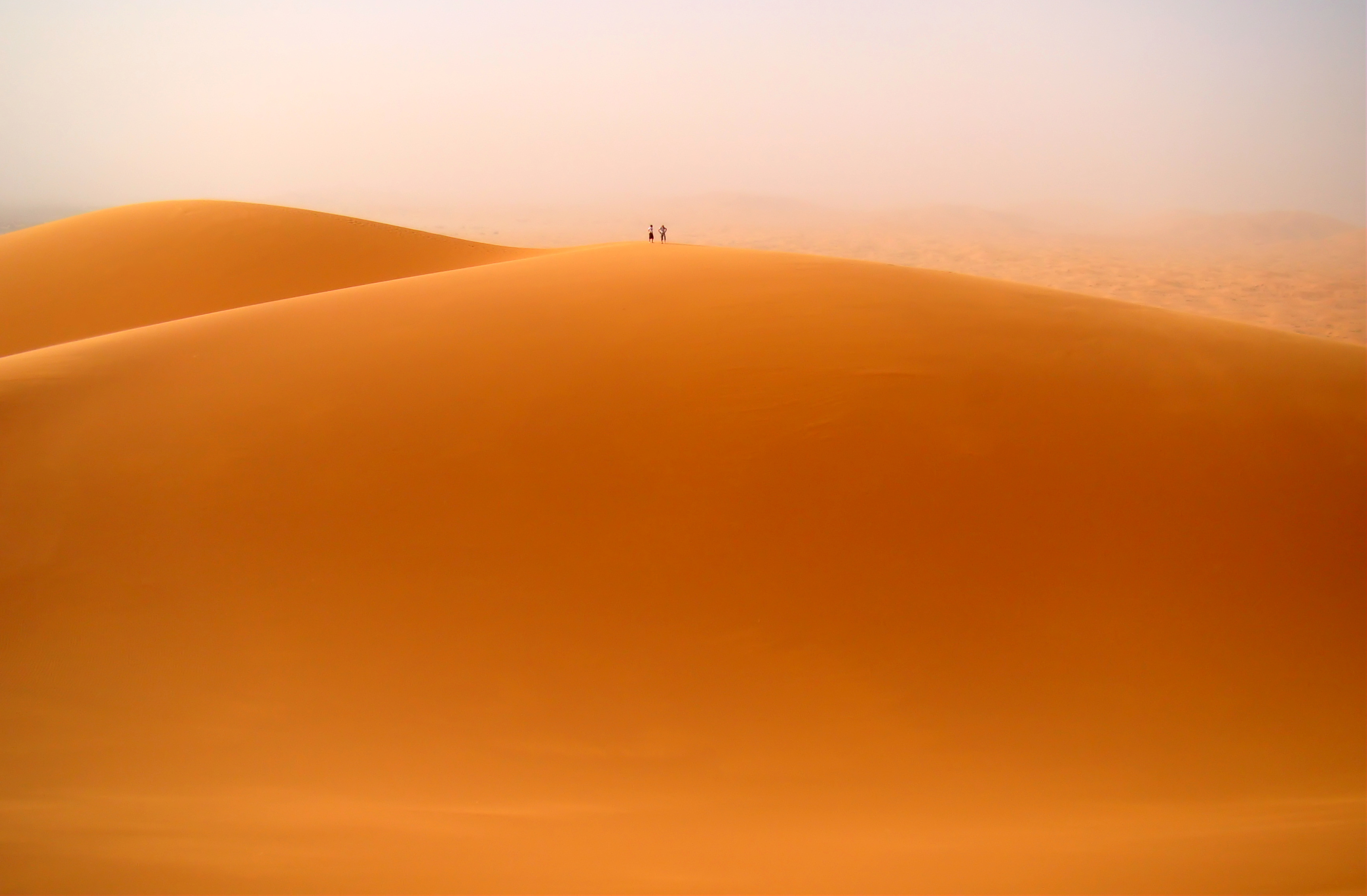
- Two people atop one of the main dunes
- Coordinates: 31°10′N 03°59′W
- Country: Morocco
- Elevation: 730 m (2,400 ft)

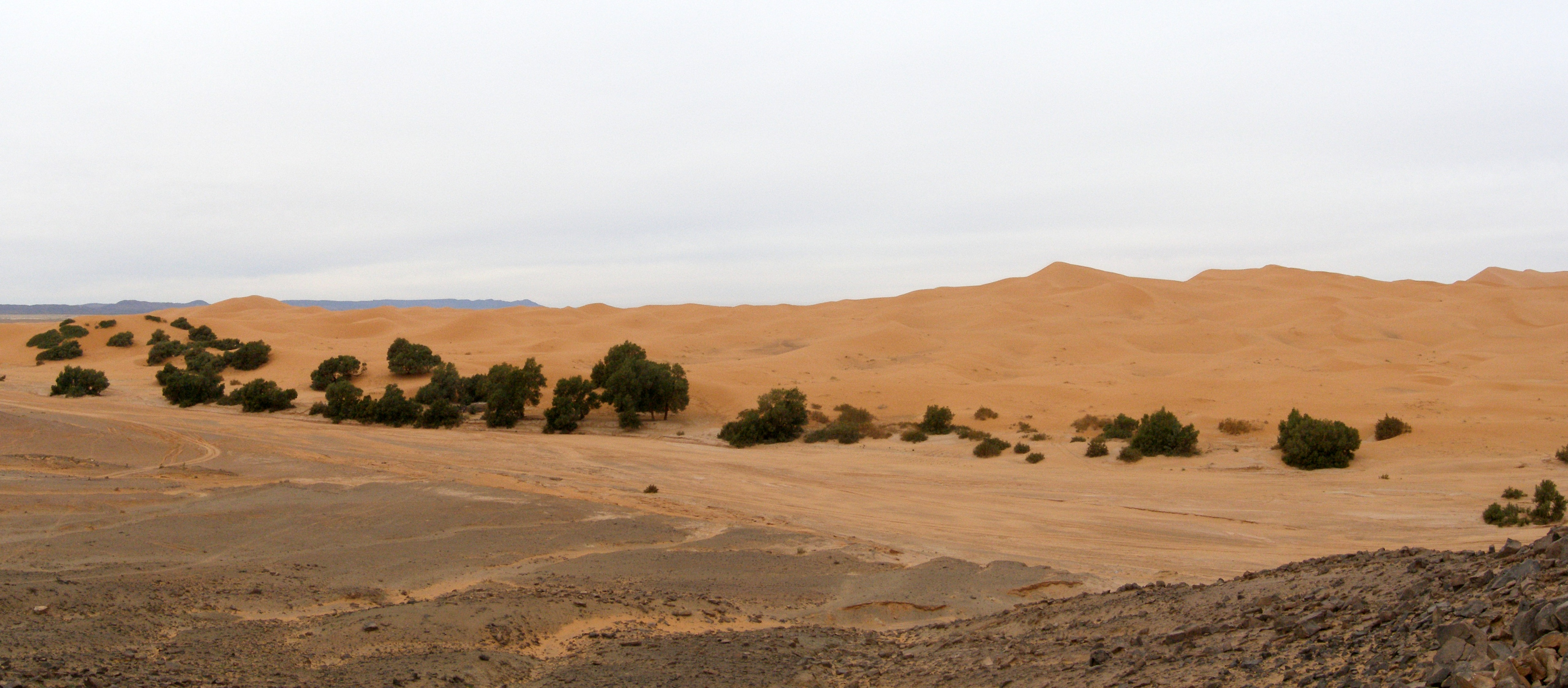
Panorama showing the transition of flat desert to dunes

Erg Chebbi (Arabic: عرق الشبي; Tamazight: ⴻⵔⴳ ⵛⴱⵉ) is one of Morocco's several ergs – large seas of dunes formed by wind-blown sand. It is located on the far western edge of the Sahara Desert. Other ergs in Morocco include Erg Chigaga near M'hamid.

== Description ==
In places, the dunes of Erg Chebbi rise to 150 meters from the surrounding hamada (rocky desert) and altogether span an area of approximately 28 kilometers from north to south and 5–7 kilometers from east to west lining the Algerian border.

The nearest sizable town is Erfoud, about 60 kilometers further north. One other city is Rissani, around 40 kilometers from Merzouga. Rissani was the site of a kingdom known as Sijilmassa, which became prosperous from the 8th to the 14th century due to its control of the caravan routes.

Although rainfall is not very common, in 2006 flooding adjacent to the dunes destroyed many buildings and killed three people.

== Tourism ==
Merzouga, the local tourist center, is located on the western lee of the dunes, together with hotels and auberges running north–south along the dunes. Many companies offer camel trips into the dunes, taking tourists on overnight trips to permanent campsites on the outer sections of the erg. Erg Chebbi's proximity to the tourist center has led to the erg sometimes being referred to as the "dunes of Merzouga".

Camel trekking has become one of the most popular activities for visitors to Erg Chebbi, offering travelers the chance to experience the vast dunes and nomadic Berber lifestyle firsthand. Many private tours from Marrakech and Fes include overnight stays in desert camps near Merzouga, where guests can watch the sunset over the dunes and enjoy traditional music around the campfire.

The most favorable time to visit Erg Chebbi is typically between October and April, when temperatures are milder and conditions are more suitable for camel trekking and desert excursions.

During the warmest part of the year, some Moroccans come to Erg Chebbi to be buried neck-deep in the hot sand for a few minutes at a time. This is considered to be a treatment for rheumatism.

== Features ==
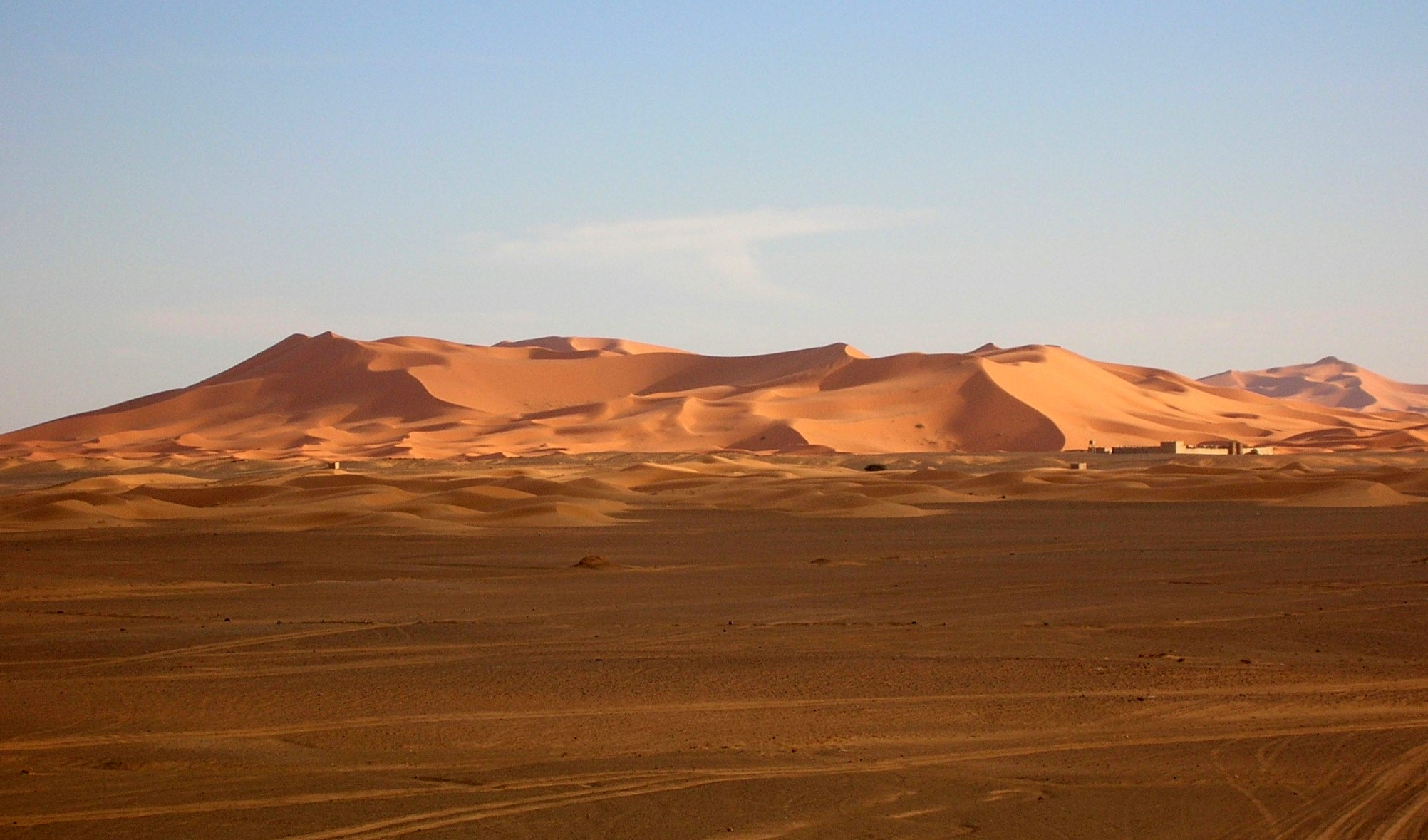
the Erg Chebbi seen from the outskirts of Merzouga

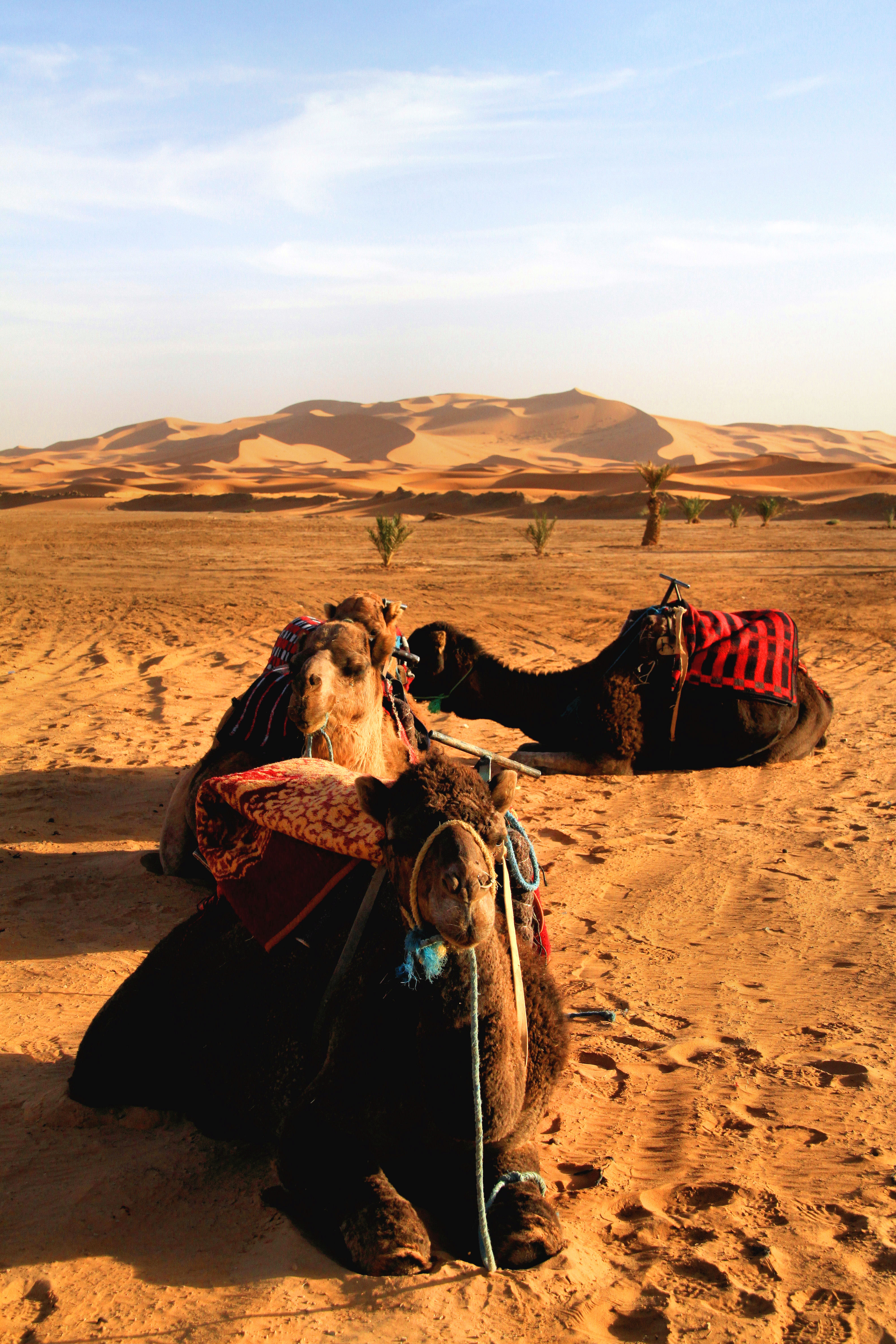
Camels used for tours into the erg

== See also ==
- Aeolian processes
- Blowout (geology)
- List of ergs

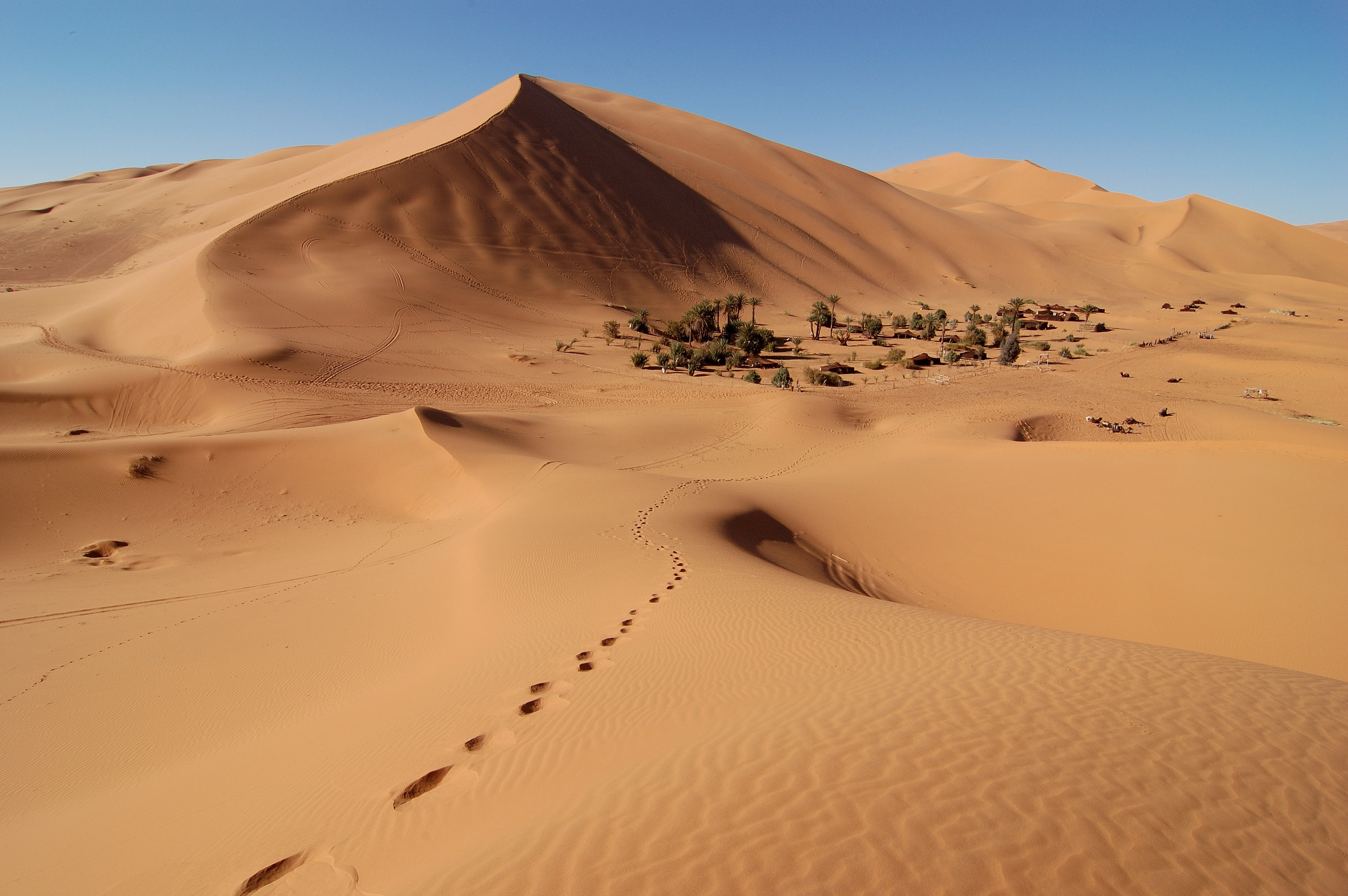
Greenery at the base of Erg Chebbi
