= List of Rough Guide albums =

This is a list of World Music Network's "Rough Guide" albums. Most of the titles in the series begin with the phrase "The Rough Guide to" or "The Rough Guide to the Music of", and so these phrases are not shown in the titles listed below; those lacking such phrases (typically benefit or compilation albums) are still designated as part of the series by their catalogue number prefix, "RGNET".

No.	Title († denotes full title)	Release date	Formats	Countries represented	Notes
0901	The Rough Guide Music Sampler^{†}	1999			
0902	The Rough Guide Music Collection^{†}	2001			
0903	Music Rough Guides: Out of this World^{†}	25 May 2004			Tenth-anniversary compilation
0904	Rough Guide: Off The Beaten Track^{†}	2006			
0905	World Party	2007			
0906	The Rough Guide to Ultimate Musical Adventures	2008			
0907	Music Rough Guides: Dance The World^{†}	2009			Perhaps re-used later as 2nd disc in World Music for Children (RGNET 1236)??
0908	The Rough Guide to the Best Music You've Never Heard	2011			
0909	The Rough Guide to Undiscovered World	2012			
0910	World Of Psychedelia	2016			Compilation of Psychedelic series (RGNET 1270,1290,1291,1302,1304,1319,1331,1332,1337)
0936	The Rough Guide To Latin Psychedelia	2013			
1001	World Music	25 October 1994		(Colombia) (Senegal) (Mali) (Democratic Republic of the Congo) (Rwanda) (Madagascar) (United States) (Egypt) (Russia) (China) (Japan) (Hungary) (England)	First edition
1002	West African Music	21 November 1995		(Mali) (Niger) (Guinea) (Ghana) (Senegal) (Mauritania)	
1003	Global Partnership II^{†}	21 November 1995			
1004	Scottish Music	2 July 1996		(Scotland)	First edition
1005	Best of Africa^{†}	1 October 1996			Benefit album for World Development Movement
1006	Irish Music	1 October 1996		(Republic of Ireland) (Northern Ireland)	First edition
1007	Kenya & Tanzania	5 November 1996		(Kenya) (Tanzania)	
1008	India & Pakistan	21 October 1996		(India) (Pakistan)	
1009	The Andes	5 November 1996		(Bolivia) (Chile) (Peru)	
1010	Zimbabwe	5 November 1996		(Zimbabwe)	
1011	North Africa	18 November 1997		(Algeria) (Egypt) (Sudan) (Morocco)	
1012	Classic Jazz	24 June 1997		(United States)	
1013	Best of Latin America^{†}	19 May 1997			Benefit album for Christian Aid
1014	One Voice: Vocal Music from Around the World^{†}	9 September 1997		(South Africa) (Bulgaria) (England) (United States) (Italy) (Finland) (Switzerland) (Bahrain) (Republic of Ireland) (Zimbabwe) (French Polynesia) (Russia) (Nepal)	Produced in partnership with New Internationalist
1015	Flamenco	18 November 1997		(Spain)	First edition
1016	Reggae	18 November 1997		(Jamaica) (England) (South Africa)	Companion CD to eponymous reference book
1017	Salsa	18 November 1997		(Colombia) (Cuba) (Venezuela) (United States)	First edition
1018	English Roots Music	25 August 1998		(England)	
1019	African Blues^{†}	9 June 1998		(Senegal) (Mali) (Mozambique) (Guinea) (Democratic Republic of the Congo) (Kenya) (Zimbabwe) (Egypt) (Republic of the Congo) (Cape Verde)	First edition; Benefit album for Voluntary Service Overseas
1020	South Africa	27 January 1998		(South Africa)	First edition
1021	Brazil	5 May 1998		(Brazil)	First edition
1022	Cuba	27 January 1998		(Cuba)	First edition
1023	Unwired: Acoustic Music from Around the World^{†}	25 May 1999		(Cameroon) (Zimbabwe) (Sudan) (Ethiopia) (Spain) (Argentina) (Colombia) (United States) (Finland) (India) (Senegal) (Mali) (Cape Verde) (Japan) (China) (Scotland)	Benefit album for Amnesty International
1024	Eastern Europe	29 September 1998		(Hungary) (Romania) (Russia) (North Macedonia) (Bulgaria) (Poland) (Albania)	First edition
1025	Portugal	25 August 1998		(Portugal)	
1026	Australian Aboriginal Music	20 April 1999		(Australia)	First edition
1027	World Roots	28 September 1999		(Uzbekistan) (Belgium) (South Africa) (Senegal) (Ecuador) (Cuba) (United States) (Brazil) (Italy) (Hungary) (Indonesia) (Pakistan)	
1028	Cajun & Zydeco	5 May 1998		(United States)	First edition
1029	Native American Music	27 October 1998		(United States)	
1030	Tango	25 May 1999		(Argentina)	First edition
1031	Japan	20 April 1999		(Japan)	First edition
1032	World Music: Volume 1: Africa, Europe and the Middle East	12 October 1999			Companion CD to eponymous reference book
1033	Rhythm-Time: World Percussion^{†}	22 June 1999		(South Africa) (Brazil) (Cuba) (Ghana) (Zimbabwe) (Senegal) (The Gambia) (Egypt) (Morocco) (Italy) (Nigeria) (Japan) (India)	Produced in partnership with New Internationalist
1034	The Gypsies	28 September 1999			
1035	Salsa Dance	27 July 1999			First edition
1036	Irish Folk	27 July 1999		(Republic of Ireland) (Northern Ireland)	First edition
1037	Tex-Mex	12 October 1999		(United States) (Mexico)	
1038	Scottish Folk	12 February 2000		(Scotland)	First edition
1039	Merengue & Bachata	13 February 2001			
1040	Calypso & Soca	28 September 1999			
1041	Africa	12 October 1999			
1042	Italy	22 February 2000		(Italy)	
1043	Cumbia	2 May 2000		(Colombia)	First edition
1044	World Music: Volume 2: Latin and North America, Caribbean, India, Asia and Pacific	31 August 2000			Companion CD to eponymous reference book
1045	South African Jazz	4 April 2000		(South Africa)	
1046	Cuban Son	2 May 2000		(Cuba)	
1047	Klezmer	25 July 2000			First edition (different track 5 when re-issued)
1048	Mali & Guinea	20 June 2000		(Mali) (Guinea)	
1049	Hawaii	20 June 2000		(United States)	
1050	Congolese Soukouss	25 July 2000		(Democratic Republic of the Congo)	
1051	Scandinavia	20 June 2000			First edition
1052	Wales	25 July 2000		(Wales)	
1053	Global Dance	29 August 2000			
1054	Bhangra	29 August 2000			First edition
1055	Indonesia	17 October 2000		(Indonesia)	
1056	Jamaica	13 February 2001		(Jamaica)	
1057	Turkey	4 February 2003		(Turkey)	
1058	Samba	27 February 2001		(Brazil)	First edition
1059	Bluegrass	27 February 2001		(United States)	First edition
1060	Senegal & Gambia	17 October 2000		(Senegal) (The Gambia)	
1061	Oxfam Salsa^{†}	26 September 2000			Benefit album for Oxfam
1062	Unwired: Africa^{†}	26 September 2000		(Mozambique) (Mali) (Democratic Republic of the Congo) (Cape Verde) (Sudan) (Guinea) (Mauritania) (Egypt) (Madagascar) (Zimbabwe) (South Africa)	Benefit album for Amnesty International
1063	Marrabenta Mozambique	27 March 2001		(Mozambique)	
1064	Sufi Music	24 April 2001			First edition
1065	Cape Verde	24 April 2001		(Cape Verde)	
1066	Greece	24 April 2001		(Greece)	
1067	Haiti	12 March 2002		(Haiti)	
1068	The Cuban Music Story	12 June 2001		(Cuba)	
1069	Okinawa	10 July 2001		(Japan)	
1070	Afro-Cuba	28 August 2001		(Cuba)	
1071	Franco	12 June 2001		(Democratic Republic of the Congo)	Individual artist compilation featuring Franco
1072	Soul Brothers	25 September 2001		(South Africa)	Individual artist compilation featuring Soul Brothers
1073	Oxfam Africa^{†}	28 August 2001			Benefit album for Oxfam
1074	Bollywood	2001		(India)	First edition
1075	Nigeria & Ghana	2 April 2002		(Nigeria) (Ghana)	
1076	Unwired: Latin America^{†}	23 October 2001		(Brazil) (Costa Rica) (Argentina) (Belize) (Peru) (Chile) (Colombia) (Cuba) (Mexico) (Bolivia)	Benefit album for Amnesty International
1077	Central America	25 September 2001		(Belize) (Honduras) (Guatemala) (Costa Rica) (Nicaragua) (Panama)	
1078	Nusrat Fateh Ali Khan	2 April 2002		(Pakistan)	Individual artist compilation featuring Nusrat Fateh Ali Khan
1079	Lucky Dube	28 August 2001		(South Africa)	Individual artist compilation featuring Lucky Dube
1080	Americana	10 July 2001		(United States)	First edition
1081	Passion^{†}	2001			Produced in partnership with New Internationalist
1082	Spain	30 July 2002		(Spain)	
1083	Ska	22 April 2003			
1084	Paris Café Music	2 April 2002		(France)	
1085	Bellydance	14 May 2002			First edition
1086	The Indian Ocean	1 October 2002			
1087	Delta Blues	4 June 2002		(United States)	
1088	Afro-Peru	14 May 2002		(Peru)	
1089	Latin Jazz	13 May 2003			
1090	Gospel	1 October 2002			
1091	India	30 July 2002		(India)	First edition
1092	Hungarian Music	29 October 2002		(Hungary)	
1093	Arabesque	30 July 2002			
1094	Louisiana	14 May 2002		(United States)	
1095	Thailand	29 July 2003		(Thailand)	
1096	The Asian Underground	11 March 2003			
1097	Boogaloo	15 March 2005			
1098	Mexico	29 October 2002		(Mexico)	
1099	South African Gospel	29 July 2003		(South Africa)	
1100	Raï	1 October 2002		(Algeria)	
1101	Unwired: Europe^{†}	29 July 2003			Benefit album for Amnesty International
1102	Highlife	4 February 2003		(Ghana)	First edition
1103	The Alps	9 July 2002			
1104	The Appalachians	9 July 2002		(United States)	
1105	The Himalayas	9 July 2002			
1106	Ali Hassan Kuban	4 June 2002		(Egypt)	Individual artist compilation featuring Ali Hassan Kuban
1107	Russia	29 October 2002		(Russia)	
1108	Oxfam Latin Dance^{†}	3 September 2002			Benefit album for Oxfam
1109	Youssou N'Dour & Étoile de Dakar	3 September 2002		(Senegal)	Individual artist compilation featuring Youssou N'Dour & Étoile de Dakar
1110	Scottish Music	22 April 2003		(Scotland)	Second edition
1111	France	22 April 2003		(France)	
1112	Salsa Colombia	23 September 2003		(Colombia)	
1113	American Roots	17 June 2003		(United States)	
1114	Egypt	21 October 2003		(Egypt)	
1115	Venezuela	21 October 2003		(Venezuela)	
1116	Pakistan	17 June 2003		(Pakistan)	
1117	Fado	29 June 2004		(Portugal)	First edition
1118	Chicago Blues	26 August 2003		(United States)	First edition
1119	Argentina	16 March 2004		(Argentina)	
1120	Italia Nova	27 April 2004		(Italy)	
1121	Oxfam Arabia^{†}	25 August 2003			Benefit album for Oxfam
1122	China	26 August 2003		(China)	
1123	Brazilian Electronica	23 September 2003		(Brazil)	
1124	Ethiopia	24 February 2004		(Ethiopia)	First edition
1125	Canada	13 May 2003		(Canada)	
1126	African Rap	3 February 2004			
1127	The Balkans	11 March 2003			
1128	Morocco	3 February 2004		(Morocco)	First edition
1129	Central Asia	1 February 2005		(Kazakhstan)	
1130	Salsa De Puerto Rico	13 May 2003		(Puerto Rico)	
1131	Bollywood Legends: Asha Bhosle	23 September 2003		(India)	Individual artist compilation featuring Asha Bhosle
1132	Bollywood Legends: Lata Mangeshkar	3 February 2004		(India)	Individual artist compilation featuring Lata Mangeshkar
1133	Bollywood Legends: Mohd. Rafi	16 March 2004		(India)	Individual artist compilation featuring Mohammed Rafi
1134	Ravi Shankar	24 February 2004		(India)	Individual artist compilation featuring Ravi Shankar
1135	Brazil: Bahia	29 June 2004		(Brazil)	
1136	Mambo	24 February 2004			
1137	Kenya	27 April 2004		(Kenya)	
1138	Gypsy Swing	16 March 2004			
1139	Cajun Dance	25 May 2004		(United States)	
1140	Tango Nuevo	31 August 2004		(Argentina)	
1141	Brazilian Hip-Hop	31 August 2004		(Brazil)	
1142	Rebetika	28 September 2004		(Greece)	
1143	Mediterranean Café Music	28 September 2004			
1144	Manu Dibango	31 August 2004		(Cameroon)	Individual artist compilation featuring Manu Dibango
1145	Zydeco	1 February 2005		(United States)	
1146	Astor Piazzolla	1 February 2005		(Argentina)	Individual artist compilation featuring Astor Piazzolla
1147	Andes: Bolivia	24 May 2005		(Bolivia)	
1148	Irish Music	15 March 2005		(Republic of Ireland) (Northern Ireland)	Second edition
1149	Dub	15 March 2005		(Jamaica)	
1150	Celia Cruz	26 April 2005		(Cuba) (United States)	Individual artist compilation featuring Celia Cruz
1151	Bottleneck Blues	26 April 2005		(United States)	
1152	Sudan	26 April 2005		(Sudan)	
1153	The Sahara	24 May 2005			
1154	Bhangra Dance	21 February 2006			
1155	Celtic Music	28 June 2005			
1156	Salsa Dance	28 June 2005			Second edition
1157	Brazil: Rio De Janeiro	16 August 2005		(Brazil)	
1158	Tanzania	14 March 2006		(Tanzania)	
1159	Balkan Gypsies	16 August 2005			
1160	Urban Latino	21 February 2006			
1161	Think Global: Bellydance^{†}	26 September 2006			Benefit album for Oxfam. Later re-released with catalogue number THINK101.
1162	Tito Puente	16 August 2005		(United States)	Individual artist compilation featuring Tito Puente
1163	Madagascar	27 September 2005		(Madagascar)	
1164	Bachata	6 June 2006		(Dominican Republic)	
1165	Iran	27 June 2006		(Iran)	
1166	African Music for Children	27 September 2005			First edition
1167	Latin Music for Children	25 October 2005			First edition
1168	Israel	21 February 2006		(Israel)	
1169	Think Global: West Africa Unwired^{†}	26 September 2006			Benefit album for Amnesty International. Later re-released with catalogue number THINK102.
1170	Flamenco Nuevo	14 March 2006		(Spain)	
1171	Merengue	25 April 2006		(Dominican Republic)	
1172	Planet Rock	6 June 2006			
1173	West African Gold	1 August 2006			
1174	Yodel	26 September 2006			
1175	Latin-Arabia	7 November 2006			
1176	Malaysia	1 August 2006		(Malaysia)	
1177	Salsa Dura NYC	20 February 2007		(United States)	
1178	South Africa	7 November 2006		(South Africa)	Second edition
1179	Bollywood	27 September 2010		(India)	Second edition
1180	The Blues	20 February 2007		(United States) (Senegal)	Companion CD to eponymous reference book
1181	World Music: Africa & Middle East	12 March 2007			Companion CD to eponymous reference book
1182	Bollywood Gold	13 March 2007		(India)	
1183	Vietnam	5 June 2007		(Vietnam)	
1184	Salsa	5 June 2007			Second edition
1185	Bellydance Café	8 May 2007			
1186	African Blues	8 May 2007			Second edition
1187	North African Café	26 June 2007			
1188	Brazil	17 July 2007		(Brazil)	Second edition
1189	Flamenco	17 July 2007		(Spain) (Cuba) (Mexico)	Second edition
1190	Latino Nuevo	14 August 2007			
1191	Salsa Clandestina	11 September 2007			
1192	Indian Lounge	11 September 2007		(India)	
1193	~~The Andes~~	unreleased			According to the label, this was originally intended for A Rough Guide To The Andes, however they were unable to clear this title, so it was never released.
1194	Paris	9 October 2007		(France)	
1195	Arabic Café	20 May 2008			First edition
1196	Latin Funk	24 September 2007			
1197	Greek Café	30 August 2010		(Greece)	Disc Two features Dimitris Mistakidis
1198	Hungarian Gypsies	12 February 2008		(Hungary)	
1199	Cuban Street Party	8 April 2008		(Cuba)	
1200	Congo Gold	12 February 2008		(Democratic Republic of the Congo)	
1201	African Street Party	4 March 2008			
1202	Bhangra	30 August 2010		(India) (Pakistan) (England) (Scotland)	Second edition; Disc Two features Achanak
1203	Klezmer Revival	25 March 2008			
1204	Blues Revival	21 April 2009		(United States) (Mali)	Disc Two features Samba Touré
1205	Klezmer Revolution	26 August 2008			
1206	Brazilian Street Party	6 May 2008		(Brazil)	
1207	Australian Aboriginal Music	19 May 2008		(Australia)	Second edition
1208	Mali	24 June 2008		(Mali)	First edition
1209	Salsa Gold	28 July 2008			
1210	Romanian Gypsies	29 July 2008		(Romania)	
1211	Japan	23 June 2008		(Japan)	Second edition
1212	Latin Street Party	26 August 2008			
1213	Calypso Gold	24 June 2008		(Trinidad and Tobago)	
1214	Russian Gypsies	21 June 2010		(Russia)	Disc Two features Kolpakov Duo
1215	Turkish Café	26 August 2008		(Turkey)	
1216	Latin Lounge	23 September 2008			
1217	Colombian Street Party	21 October 2008		(Colombia)	
1218	Afrobeat Revival	24 March 2009			Disc Two features Kokolo
1219	Tango	24 March 2009		(Argentina)	Second edition; Disc Two features Carlos Libedinsky
1220	Gypsy Music	21 April 2009			Disc Two features Bela Lakatos & The Gypsy Youth Project
1221	Gypsy Revival	15 September 2009			Disc Two features Shukar Collective
1222	Afrobeat Revolution	28 July 2009			Disc Two features Kaleta & Zozo Afrobeat
1223	Blues And Beyond	25 August 2009			Disc Two features Nuru Kane
1224	Tango Revival	13 October 2009			Disc Two features Carlos Gardel
1225	Cuba	28 July 2009		(Cuba)	Second edition; Disc Two features Sierra Maestra
1226	Irish Folk	30 June 2009		(Republic of Ireland) (Northern Ireland)	Second edition; Disc Two features Karan Casey
1227	Brazilian Lounge	25 August 2009		(Brazil)	Disc Two features Axial
1228	Salsa Divas	24 May 2010			Disc Two features Yoko Mimata
1229	Merengue Dance	30 June 2009		(Dominican Republic)	Disc Two features Carlitos Almonte
1230	Arabic Lounge	15 March 2010			Disc Two features Akim El Sikameya
1231	India	21 June 2010		(India)	Second edition; Disc Two features Debashish Bhattacharya
1232	Jazz and Blues Legends: Robert Johnson	1 November 2010		(United States)	Individual artist compilation featuring Robert Johnson; Disc Two highlights his influence on various artists
1233	Jazz and Blues Legends: Muddy Waters: Country Blues	18 April 2011		(United States)	Individual artist compilation featuring Muddy Waters; Disc Two highlights musicians with whom he played
1234	Jazz and Blues Legends: Billie Holiday	4 May 2010		(United States)	Individual artist compilation featuring Billie Holiday; Disc Two highlights her contemporaries
1235	Scottish Folk	25 May 2010		(Scotland)	Second edition; Disc Two features Maggie McInnes
1236	World Music for Children	15 March 2010			First edition; Disc Two is entitled "Dance The World", featuring various artists
1237	Afghanistan	30 August 2010		(Afghanistan)	Disc Two features Ahmad Sham Sufi Qawwali Group
1238	Desert Blues	26 July 2010		(Mali) (Western Sahara) (Mauritania) (Niger)	Disc Two features Etran Finatawa
1239	Salsa Dance	10 August 2010			Includes a dance instruction DVD
1240	Paris Café	26 July 2010			Disc Two features Beltuner
1241	Classical Composers: J.S. Bach	1 November 2011		(Germany)	Individual composer compilation featuring Johann Sebastian Bach; Produced in partnership with Hyperion Records; Disc Two features Angela Hewitt
1242	Classical Composers: Beethoven	1 November 2011		(Germany)	Individual composer compilation featuring Ludwig van Beethoven; Produced in partnership with Hyperion Records; Disc Two features Mass in C major
1243	Classical Composers: Mozart	1 November 2011		(Austria)	Individual composer compilation featuring Wolfgang Amadeus Mozart; Produced in partnership with Hyperion Records; Disc Two features string quintets
1244	Blues Legends: Leadbelly	1 November 2010		(United States)	Individual artist compilation featuring Lead Belly; Disc Two highlights artists he played with and influenced
1245	Jazz Legends: Ella Fitzgerald	2 November 2010	CD, Digital	(United States)	Individual artist compilation featuring Ella Fitzgerald; Disc Two highlights artists she sang with and influenced
1246	Jazz Legends: Charlie Parker	23 May 2011		(United States)	Individual artist compilation featuring Charlie Parker; Disc Two highlights other co-founders of bebop
1247	Jazz Legends: Duke Ellington	29 November 2011		(United States)	Individual artist compilation featuring Duke Ellington; Disc Two is entitled "Original Jazz Legends"
1248	Flamenco Dance	12 October 2010		(Spain)	Disc Two features Eduardo Niebla
1249	Bellydance	14 March 2011			Second edition; Includes a dance instruction DVD
1250	Paris Lounge	19 April 2011		(France)	Disc Two features Marianne Dissard
1251	African Lullabies	6 September 2011			Disc Two features Virginia Mukwesha
1252	Klezmer	19 April 2011			Second edition; Disc Two features Sukke
1253	Jazz Legends: Louis Armstrong	23 May 2011		(United States)	Individual artist compilation featuring Louis Armstrong; Disc Two is entitled "Jazz Legends"
1254	Jazz Legends: Miles Davis: Birth of a Legend	23 May 2011		(United States)	Individual artist compilation featuring Miles Davis; Disc Two is entitled "Jazz Giants"
1255	World Lullabies	26 July 2011			Disc Two features Black Umfolosi
1256	World Playtime	30 August 2011			Disc Two features Mory Kanté
1257	Brazilian Café	21 June 2011		(Brazil)	Disc Two features Vitor Ramil & Marcos Suzano
1258	Legends: Edith Piaf	29 November 2011		(France)	Individual artist compilation featuring Edith Piaf; Disc Two is entitled "Vintage Paris"
1259	African Guitar Legends	15 March 2011			Disc Two features Syran Mbenza & Ensemble Rumba Kongo
1260	Fado	31 January 2012		(Portugal)	Second edition; Disc Two features Cristina Branco
1261	English Folk	21 June 2011		(England)	Disc Two features Coope Boyes and Simpson
1262	Sufi Music	26 July 2011			Second edition; Disc Two features Sufi Fakirs Of Bengal
1263	Blues Legends: John Lee Hooker: Birth of a Legend	17 October 2011		(United States)	Individual artist compilation featuring John Lee Hooker; Disc Two is entitled "Blues Greats"
1264	Blues Legends: Bessie Smith	26 September 2011		(United States)	Individual artist compilation featuring Bessie Smith; Disc Two is entitled "Original Blues Divas"
1265	Cajun & Zydeco	24 October 2011		(United States)	Second edition; Disc Two features Chubby Carrier and the Bayou Swamp Band
1266	Morocco	27 February 2012		(Morocco)	Second edition; Disc Two features Groupe Mazagan
1267	Bluegrass	31 January 2012		(United States)	Second edition; Disc Two features Scott Holstein
1268	Blues Legends: Charley Patton	6 March 2012		(United States)	Individual artist compilation featuring Charley Patton; Disc Two is entitled "Delta Blues Legacy"
1269	African Roots Revival	3 April 2012			Disc Two features Kenge Kenge
1270	Psychedelic Africa	12 March 2012		(Nigeria) (Benin) (Guinea) (Ethiopia) (Tanzania) (Senegal) (Ghana) (Mali)	Disc Two features Victor Uwaifo
1271	Celtic Women	12 March 2012			Disc Two features Teresa Doyle
1272	New Orleans	3 April 2012		(United States)	Disc Two features Dumpstaphunk
1273	Celtic Lullabies	26 June 2012			Disc Two features Gráinne Hambly
1274	Country Legends: Jimmie Rodgers	30 July 2013		(United States)	Individual artist compilation featuring Jimmie Rodgers; Disc Two is entitled "Country Music Pioneers"
1275	Voodoo	24 September 2013		(Cuba) (Haiti) (Trinidad and Tobago) (United States) (Benin) (Brazil)	Disc Two features Erol Josué
1276	The Mediterranean	25 June 2013			Disc Two features Eduardo Niebla & Adel Salameh
1277	Blues Legends: B.B. King: Birth of a Legend	16 July 2012		(United States)	Individual artist compilation featuring B.B. King; Disc Two is entitled "Original Bluesmen"
1278	Blues Legends: Howlin' Wolf	21 August 2012		(United States)	Individual artist compilation featuring Howlin' Wolf; Disc Two is entitled "Wolf's Inspiration"
1279	Jazz Legends: John Coltrane: Birth of a Legend	2 October 2012		(United States)	Individual artist compilation featuring John Coltrane; Disc Two is entitled "Trane In Session"
1280	Highlife	26 June 2012		(Ghana)	Second edition; Disc Two features Seprewa Kasa
1281	Caribbean Café	29 May 2012			Disc Two features Dédé Saint Prix
1282	Scandinavia	31 July 2012			Second edition; Disc Two features Kardemimmit
1283	Hungary	10 September 2012		(Hungary)	Disc Two features Tarkany Muvek
1284	Senegal	29 January 2013		(Senegal)	Disc Two features Daby Balde
1285	China	31 July 2012		(China)	Second edition; Disc Two features Hanggai
1286	Ethiopia	25 September 2012		(Ethiopia)	Second edition; Disc Two features Invisible System
1287	Salsa	25 September 2012			Third edition; Disc Two features Bio Ritmo
1288	Native America	25 September 2012		(United States) (Canada)	Disc Two features Pura Fé
1289	Samba	29 January 2013		(Brazil)	Second edition; Disc Two features Ruivão
1290	Psychedelic Brazil	28 May 2013		(Brazil)	Disc Two features Júpiter Maçã
1291	Latin Psychedelia	15 April 2013			Disc Two features Los Destellos
1292	African Music for Children	27 May 2013			Second edition; Disc Two features Saba Anglana
1293	Cumbia	26 February 2013			Second edition; Disc Two features Los Corraleros de Majagual
1294	Irish Music	25 February 2013		(Republic of Ireland) (Northern Ireland)	Third edition; Disc Two features Bob Brozman, John McSherry, & Dónal O'Connor
1295	Arabic Revolution	26 March 2013		(Egypt) (Tunisia) (Palestine) (United Kingdom) (Libya) (Lebanon)	Disc Two features Ramy Essam
1296	African Disco	15 April 2013		(Nigeria) (Ghana) (South Africa) (France) (Cameroon)	Disc Two features Maloko
1297	Acoustic Africa	25 March 2013		(Niger) (Madagascar) (Democratic Republic of the Congo) (South Africa) (Lesotho) (Mozambique) (Norway) (Sweden) (Zimbabwe) (Ghana) (Cameroon) (Mali) (South Sudan) (Senegal) (Guinea)	Disc Two features Noumoucounda Cissoko
1298	Blues Legends: Blind Lemon Jefferson	3 September 2013		(United States)	Individual artist compilation featuring Blind Lemon Jefferson; Disc Two is entitled "Country Blues Pioneers"
1299	Blues Legends: Blind Willie Johnson	26 August 2013		(United States)	Individual artist compilation featuring Blind Willie Johnson; Disc Two is entitled "Gospel Blues Legends"
1300	Music Without Frontiers	2014			Disc Two features Namgyal Lhamo
1301	Flamenco	24 June 2013		(Spain)	Third edition; Disc Two features Al Toque Flamenco
1302	Psychedelic Bollywood	30 July 2013		(India)	Disc Two features R. D. Burman
1303	Blues Legends: Blind Blake	24 September 2013		(United States)	Individual artist compilation featuring Blind Blake; Disc Two is entitled "The Rough Guide To Ragtime Blues & Hokum"
1304	Psychedelic Salsa	2015			
1305	Bollywood Ballads				Deleted
1306	Bollywood Disco				Deleted
1307	Bollywood for Children	15 October 2013	digital download	(India)	Digital only
1308	Bollywood Swing				Deleted
1309	Latin Rare Groove	2014			Disc Two features Spanglish Fly
1310	Scottish Music	24 February 2014		(Scotland)	Disc Two features Cliar
1311	Mali	2014-04-19	CD, Digital, Vinyl	(Mali)	Second edition; Disc Two features Samba Touré
1312	The Best African Music You've Never Heard	28 January 2014			Disc Two features Sotho Sounds
1313	Latin Dance	2013	digital download		Digital only
1314	Celtic Music	2014			Second edition; Disc Two features Dalla
1315	Arabic Café	2014			Second edition; Disc Two features Dozan
1316	African Blues	2014			Third edition; Disc Two features Alhousseini Anivolla
1317	Palestine	2014			Disc Two features Ramzi Aburedwan
1318	Indian Classical Music	26 May 2014			Disc Two features Calcutta Slide Guitar
1319	Psychedelic Cambodia	2014	CD, Digital, Vinyl		Disc Two features Cambodian Space Project
1320	Arabic Jazz	2014			Disc Two features Hijaz
1321	Latin Music for Children	2014			Second edition; Disc Two features Wayne Gorbea's Salsa Piccante
1322	Fado Legends	2014			Disc Two features Katia Guerreiro
1323	African Rare Groove Vol. 1	2015			
1324	Latin Rare Groove Volume 2	2015			Second edition
1325	The Sahara	2014			Second edition; Disc Two features Mamane Barka
1326	Flamenco Guitar	2014			Disc Two features Antonio Rey
1327	Bollywood Disco	2014			Disc Two features Kishore Kumar
1328	Blues Legends: Barbecue Bob	2015			
1329	Tango Legends: Carlos Gardel	2015		(Argentina)	
1330	Blues Legends: Blind Boy Fuller	2015			
1331	Psychedelic Samba	2015			
1332	Psychedelic India	2015			
1333	~~The Rough Guide To Latin Rare Groove Vol. 3~~	?			According to the label, this was originally intended for The Rough Guide To Latin Rare Groove Vol. 3, however they were unable to clear this title, so it was never released.
1334	Unsung Heroes of Country Blues	2015			
1335	East Coast Blues	2015		(United States)	
1336	Calypso Gold	2015			Re-issue
1337	Psychedelic Cumbia	2015			
1338	Latin Disco	2015			
1339	The Best Arabic Music You've Never Heard	2015		(Algeria) (Israel) (Jordan) (Morocco)	
1340	The Best World Music You've Never Heard	2016			
1341	South African Jazz	2016			Second edition
1342	Americana	2016			Second edition
1343	The Blues Songsters	2015			
1344	Unsung Heoroes of Country Blues, Vol. 2	2015			
1345	Brazilian Jazz	2016			
1346	Bottleneck Blues	2016			Second edition
1347	Peru Rare Groove	2016			
1348	Cuban Rare Groove	2016			
1349	Gospel Blues	2016			
1350	Ethiopian Jazz	2016	CD, Digital, Vinyl		
1351	West Africa	2017	CD, Digital, Vinyl		
1352	Blues Women	2016	CD, vinyl, digital download		
1353	Delta Blues	2016	CD, vinyl, digital download		Second edition
1354	Bollywood: The Psychedelic Years	2017	vinyl, digital download		
1355	Buddy Holly & The Crickets	2017	CD, Digital, Vinyl		
1356	Ray Charles	2017	CD, vinyl, digital download		
1357	Hillbilly Blues	2017	CD, vinyl, digital download		
1358	Jug Band Blues	2017	CD, digital download		
1359	Ragtime Blues	2017	CD, digital download		
1360	Holy Blues	2017	CD, vinyl, digital download		
1361	Acoustic India	2017	CD, digital download		
1362	The Best Country Blues You've Never Heard	2018			
1363	Thelonious Monk	2018	CD, digital download		
1364	Johnny Cash: Birth of a Legend	2018	CD, digital download		
1365	Cambodian Psychedelia	2018-07-27	Digital, Vinyl		
1366	Blind Willie McTell	2018	CD, digital download		
1367	Chuck Berry	2018	CD, digital download		
1368	Scottish Folk	2018	CD, digital download		Third edition
1369	?	?			Still no RGNET 1369
1370	World Music (25th Anniversary Edition)	2018	CD, Digital		Twenty-fifth anniversary edition
1371	Ravi Shankar -second edition-	2018	CD, digital download		
1372	Zakir Hussain	2018	CD, digital download		
1373	Akbar Khan	2018	CD, digital download		
1374	Hokum Blues	2018	CD, digital download		
1375	Barrelhouse Blues	2018	CD, digital download		
1376	Nina Simone	2018	CD, digital download		
1377	Blind, Black & Blue	2019-07-26	CD, Digital, Vinyl		
1378	Arabian Jazz	2019	Vinyl		
1379	A World of Guitar	2019-04-13	Vinyl		
1380	Skip James	2019-03-27	Digital, Vinyl		
1381	Women of the World	2019-01-25	CD, Digital		
1382	Bo Diddley	2019-03-29	CD, Digital, Vinyl		
1383	Mississippi John Hurt	2019-05-31	Vinyl		
1384	Mali Blues	2019-07-26	CD, Digital, Vinyl		
1385	World Jazz	2019-08-30	CD, Digital, Vinyl		
1386	Eastern Europe	2019-02-22	CD, Digital		Second edition
1387	World Music for Children	2019-05-31	CD, Digital		Second edition
1388	Country Blues (Reborn And Remastered)	2019-06-28	CD, Digital		
1389	Billie Holiday: Birth of a Legend	2019-09-27	CD, Digital, Vinyl		
1390	Brazilian Psychedelia	2020-04-17 / 2021-03-26	Vinyl		
1391	The Roots of Country Music	2019-08-30	CD, Digital		
1392	Blues Divas	2019-11-29	CD, Digital, Vinyl		
1393	African Beats	2020-04-18 (Vinyl) / 2021-02-26 (CD)	CD, Digital, Vinyl		
1394	Spiritual India	2020-04-18	CD, Digital, Vinyl		
1395	Robert Johnson: Delta Blues Legend	2020-03-27	Digital, Vinyl		
1396	Charley Patton: Father Of The Delta Blues	2020-02-28	Digital, Vinyl		
1397	The Roots Of The Blues	2020-02-28	CD, Digital, Vinyl		
1398	Urban Mali	2020-09-11	Digital, Vinyl		
1399	Cape Jazz	2020-11-27	Digital, Vinyl		
1400	Booze & Blues				
1401	Blues Behind Bars				
1402	Gamblin’ & Ramblin’ Blues				
1403	Spiritual Blues				
1404	The Roots Of Gospel	2020-09-11	CD, Digital		
1405	Avant‐Garde Japan	2021-01-29	CD, Digital, Vinyl		
1406	Japanese Music You’ve Never Heard	2021-05-28	CD, Digital		
1407	African Guitar	2021-06-25	Digital, Vinyl		
1408	Chicago Blues	2020-11-27	CD, Digital, Vinyl		Second edition
1409	The Roots of Jazz	2021-04-30	CD, Digital, Vinyl		
1410	World Music Unplugged	2021-04-30	CD, Digital		
1411	Memphis Blues				
1412	The Delta Blues				
1413	Blowin’ The Blues				
1414	The Best Country Blues You’ve Never Heard (Vol. 2)	2021-07-30	CD, Digital		
1415	Bullets & Blues Reborn and Remastered				
1416	Texas Blues	2022-01-28	CD, Digital		
1417	Delta Blues vol. 2	2022	CD, Digital		
1418	The Rough Guide To Reverend Gary Davis: The Guitar Evangelist	2022	CD, Digital		
1419	The Rough Guide to Jewish Music	2022	CD, Digital		
1420	The Rough Guide to Slide Guitar Blues	2022	CD, Digital		
1421	The Rough Guide to the Music of Yunnan	2022	CD, Digital		
1422	The Rough Guide to Memphis Minnie: Queen of the Country Blues	2022	CD, Digital		
1423	The Rough Guide To Big Bill Broonzy: The Early Years	2023	CD, Digital		
1424	The Rough Guide to Railroad Blues	2023	CD, Digital		
1425	The Rough Guide To Capoeira	2023	CD, Digital		
1426		??			The following are music samplers that contain tracks from other regular releases in the ROUGH GUIDE series which have been segregated from the regular RGNET releases for cataloguing purposes. For some reason they have been released starting with 901 and follow sequentially
1426LP	The Rough Guide To Murder Ballads	2024			
1427	The Rough Guide to World Music Network	??	CD, Digital		
1428	Blue Rhythm presents: The Rough Guide Music Sampler	2000	CD, Digital		
1428LP	The Rough Guide To Blues & The Beast	2024			
1429	The Rough Guides Collection	2001	CD, Digital		
1429CD	The Rough Guide To Mississippi Blues	2024	CD, Digital		
1430	Music Rough Guides: Out of This World	2004	CD, Digital		
1431	Music Rough Guides: Off the Beaten Track	2006	CD, Digital		
1432	The Rough Guide to World Party	2007	CD, Digital		
1433	The Rough Guide to Ultimate Musical Adventures	2008	CD, Digital		
1434	Music Rough Guides: Dance the World	2009	CD, Digital		
1435	The Rough Guide to the Best Music You've Never Heard	2011	CD, Digital		
1436	The Rough Guide to Undiscovered World	2012	CD, Digital		
1437	Rough Guide to a World of Psychedelia	2016	CD, Digital		
1438					The following are boxed sets that contain several different Rough Guide compositions together and are catalogued as RGBOX
1439	Africa: Music Rough Guide	??			Can't seem to find anything out about this one except that it exists
1440	The Rough Guides to Latin America: Latin Dance Crazes: Salsa, Son and Samba				Can't seem to find anything out about this one except that it exists
1441	The Rough Guides: American Roots Box	2002	CD, Digital		
1442	The Rough Guides: Arabic Beat Box	2003	CD, Digital		
1443	The Rough Guides: Asian Beat Box	2003	CD, Digital		
1444	Make the Most of Your Time On Earth: A Rough Guide to the World	2007	CD, Digital		
1445					RGBOX 7 is mysteriously missing from the queue
1446	The Rough Guide to Latin Grooves Boxset	2012	CD, Digital		
1447					Launched in 2005 Think Global is World Music Network’s ethical label supporting the work of Oxfam and Amnesty International by producing superb collections of cutting edge music. Tacked on because it's sort of a subset of the Rough Guide series.
1448	Think Global: Bellydance	2006	CD, Digital		
1449	Think Global: West Africa Unwired		CD, Digital		
1450	Think Global: Tango	2007	CD, Digital		
1451	Think Global: World Christmas	2007	CD, Digital		
1452	Think Global: Salsa	2007	CD, Digital		
1453	Think Global: Women of Africa	2007	CD, Digital		
1454	Think Global: Acoustic Brazil	2008	CD, Digital		
1455	Think Global: Native America	2008	CD, Digital		
1456	Think Global: Fiesta Latina	2008	CD, Digital		
1457	Think Global: Celebrate Africa	2009	CD, Digital		
