= The Rough Guide to Desert Blues =

2010 compilation album by various artists

Compilation album by Various artists
- Released: 26 July 2010
- Genre: World, Tichumaren
- Length: 113:58
- Label: World Music Network

Rough Guides chronology
| The Rough Guide to the Music of Afghanistan (2010) | The Rough Guide to Desert Blues (2010) | The Rough Guide to Salsa Dance (2010) |

The Rough Guide To Desert Blues is a world music compilation album originally released in 2010. Desert blues refers to the music of the Mandinka and related nomad groups of the Sahara, who perform a style of music considered the root of the American Blues genre. This was first popularized in the West by Ali Farka Touré and has more recently been carried by a new wave of artists such as Tinariwen.

Part of the World Music Network Rough Guides series, the album contains two discs: an overview of the genre on Disc One, and a "bonus" Disc Two highlighting Etran Finatawa. Disc One features nine Malian tracks, two Sahrawi, and one each from Mauritania and Niger. The compilation was produced by Phil Stanton, co-founder of the World Music Network.

== Critical reception ==
Professional ratings
Review scores
| Source | Rating |
|---|---|
| MSN Music (Expert Witness) | A- |
| PopMatters | 8/10 stars |
| Limelight | 4/5 stars |
| Songlines | 4/5 stars |
| Allmusic | 4/5 stars |

The album met positive reviews upon release. Robert Christgau called the compilation an "accessible variant" of the Rough Guide to the Music of the Sahara. He went on to include it in his top albums of 2010. Chris Nickson of AllMusic named it a "thorough introduction" to desert blues but called the Amadou & Mariam track "the odd one out", claiming it doesn't represent the genre. David Maine of PopMatters said that while albums in the series could be hit-and miss, this one had "far more hits than misses." Calling Tinariwen "the greatest band in the world right now, bar none", Maine explained that he'd long wondered whether similar acts were "ripping off" Tinariwen, and that the album had emphatically proven that they are "not simply mimicking" the band's success.

== Track listing ==
=== Disc One ===
| No. | Title | Artist (Country) | Length |
|---|---|---|---|
| 1. | "Ténéré Wer Tat Zinchegh" | Terakaft (Mali) | 4:49 |
| 2. | "Bambugu Blues" | Bassekou Kouyate & Ngoni Ba (Mali) | 5:06 |
| 3. | "Mali Dje" | Ali Farka Touré (Mali) | 5:39 |
| 4. | "Tenhert" | Tinariwen (Mali) | 5:29 |
| 5. | "Tefla Madlouma" | Mariem Hassan (Western Sahara) | 4:09 |
| 6. | "Aitimani" | Etran Finatawa (Niger) | 7:06 |
| 7. | "Yarab" | Malouma (Mauritania) | 5:04 |
| 8. | "Beaux Dimanches" | Amadou & Mariam (Mali) | 3:23 |
| 9. | "Kaïri Kaïri" | Samba Touré (Mali) | 5:23 |
| 10. | "Achachore I Chachare Akale" | Tartit (Mali) | 4:31 |
| 11. | "El Profeta" | Jalihena Natu (Western Sahara) | 4:46 |
| 12. | "Mashi" | Mamane Barka (Niger) | 3:50 |
| 13. | "Aratane N’adagh" | Tamikrest (Mali) | 5:10 |

=== Disc Two ===
All tracks on Disc Two are performed by Etran Finatawa.

| No. | Title | Length |
|---|---|---|
| 1. | "Surbajo" | 5:32 |
| 2. | "A Dunya" | 5:04 |
| 3. | "Iledeman" | 3:41 |
| 4. | "Aliss" | 5:49 |
| 5. | "Maleele" | 3:52 |
| 6. | "Iriarer" | 4:56 |
| 7. | "Ekenan" | 5:40 |
| 8. | "Anadjibo" | 5:27 |
| 9. | "Ronde" | 5:07 |
| 10. | "Heeme" | 4:22 |
