= The Rough Guide to the Music of Morocco =

The Rough Guide to the Music of Morocco refers to two albums by the World Music Network:

- The Rough Guide to the Music of Morocco (2004 album)
- The Rough Guide to the Music of Morocco (2012 album)
