= The Rough Guide to Acoustic Africa =

Compilation album by Various artists
- Released: 25 March 2013
- Genres: World, acoustic, African
- Length: 127:08
- Label: World Music Network

Full series chronology
The Rough Guide to African Disco (2013)	The Rough Guide to Acoustic Africa (2013)	The Rough Guide to Flamenco (2013)

The Rough Guide to Acoustic Africa is a world music compilation album originally released in 2013 featuring acoustic music spanning Sub-Saharan Africa. Part of the World Music Network Rough Guides series, the album contains two discs: an overview of the genre on Disc One, and a "bonus" Disc Two highlighting griot Noumoucounda Cissoko. Disc One features artists hailing from Niger, Madagascar, the DRC, South Africa, Lesotho, Mozambique, Zimbabwe, Ghana, Cameroon, Mali, South Sudan, Sudan, Senegal, and Guinea. All but three tracks are guitar-based. The extensive liner notes were written by Daniel Rosenberg, and Phil Stanton, co-founder of the World Music Network, produced the album.

== Critical reception ==
Professional ratings
Review scores
Source	Rating
MSN Music (Expert Witness)	A-
PopMatters	7/10 stars

The recording received positive reviews. After admitting that compilations spanning many countries typically annoy him, Robert Christgau recounted this one as "soft-spoken" and "pretty" enough to award it an "A−". David Maine of PopMatters wrote that this release was consistent with Rough Guides' "knack for culling good tunes from a far-flung range of material". Maine was particularly impressed by Disc Two, comparing Cissoko with Salif Keita.

== Track listing ==
=== Disc one ===
No.	Title	Artist (Country)	Length
1.	"Saghmar N Nanna"	Etran Finatawa (Niger)	4:54
2.	"Sweet Lullaby"	Lala Njava (Madagascar)	4:03
3.	"Mbanda Nasali Nini? (Madeleine)"	Syran Mbenza & Ensemble Rumba Kongo (Democratic Republic of the Congo)
4.	"Yekanini"	Shiyani Ngcobo (South Africa)	4:31
5.	"Ha Kele Monateng"	Sotho Sounds (Lesotho)	3:28
6.	"Ndinewe"	Monoswezi (Mozambique) (Norway) (Sweden) (Zimbabwe)	4:50
7.	"Masikini"	Eyuphuro (Mozambique)	5:09
8.	"See Wo Nom Me (Tsetse Fly You Suck My Blood)"	Koo Nimo (Ghana)	4:22
9.	"Obili Éba"	Mr Eddy & Sally Nyolo (Cameroon)	5:22
10.	"White Crocodile Blues (A Song for M) [Instrumental]"	Samba Touré (Mali)	3:44
11.	"Lemon Bara"	Abdel Gadir Salim & Emmanuel Jal (Sudan) (South Sudan)
12.	"Diamano"	Amadou Diagne (Senegal)	3:41
13.	"Djou"	Mory Kanté (Guinea)	5:34
14.	"Aomby Mazava Loha"	Vakoka (Madagascar)	4:21
15.	"Afrika"	Nuru Kane (Senegal)	3:35
16.	"AIDS"	Mabulu (Mozambique)	4:28

=== Disc two ===
All tracks on Disc Two are by Noumoucounda Cissoko, a Senegalese kora-playing griot, from his 2012 digital album "Falling".

No.	Title	Length
1.	"Interlude 1"	0:28
2.	"Noumou Koradioulou"	4:10
3.	"Nagnou Talal Loxxo Afrique"	6:45
4.	"Sining featuring Tumi Molekane"	7:22
5.	"Interlude 2"	0:39
6.	"Dindingo A Bamah"	4:47
7.	"Bannaya Foly"	6:25
8.	"Begg Ci Yow"	5:06
9.	"Yekhi Medina"	4:22
10.	"Interlude 3"	1:26
11.	"Gorgni featuring Fredy Massamba"	6:08
12.	"Bannadenoufele"	5:58
13.	"Interlude 4"	1:18
