= Filbert Marova =

Zimbabwean jazz pianist and composer

Background information
- Also known as: Philbert Marova, Philbert Marowa, Filbert Marowa
- Born: Filbert Marova; Zimbabwe
- Genres: Jazz and mbiriano

Filbert Marova is a Zimbabwean jazz pianist, composer and music educator who has performed with groups including The Frontline Kids and Jazz Invitation also released solo albums including Kariba Bream, Nyanga Trout and Zim Jazz Chapter 1. In 2016 he founded the Zimbabwe Jazz Community Trust (ZJCT).

== Career ==
Marova began his professional career as a rhythm guitarist with Scanners International, a group of young musicians from Dzivarasekwa, Harare, which later became Frontline Kids. When the group's keyboard player left, manager Fred Zindi encouraged Marova to take up keyboards and arranged lessons for him through the Zimbabwe College of Music.

The group adopted the name Frontline Kids in 1988 and recorded the albums Children of the Frontline, African Jive and Hupenyu. Marova remained with the band until the early 1990s.

In 1992, after leaving Frontline Kids, Marova joined Kelly Rusike's Jazz Invitation where he composed the hit "BP Yangu Yakwira", which was performed by Prudence Katomeni-Mbofana.

Marova later began recording as a solo artist with his first album Kariba Bream released in 2006. The Herald reported that the album received the Best Jazz Album award at that year's Zimbabwe Music Awards.

He subsequently formed Blaqberry Jazz with Eve Kawadza, Tafadzwa Marova and Mutsawashe Gudlanga. The quartet performed jazz alongside blues, soul, rock, funk and Zimbabwean musical styles.

Marova's second album, Nyanga Trout, followed in the 2010s. He also recorded Hard Hat Area and later Zim Jazz Chapter 1. Musicians appearing on the recording included Prudence Katomeni-Mbofana, Hope Masike, Nonhlanhla Muhoni, John Pfumojena, Tinashe Mukarati, Peter Hunt and Tafadzwa Marova.

=== Awards ===
Marova won Best Jazz Artist at the Zimbabwe Music Awards in 2006.

== Mbiriano ==
Marova later developed a creative project, "Mbiriano", in which musical patterns from the Zimbabwean mbira are played on piano and combined with jazz harmony and improvisation. The project resulted in the album Mbiriano Style while Marova continued working with the approach on Metamorphosis, released in 2025. NewsDay described Metamorphosis as his sixth studio album and showed how the seven-track recording used mbira-inspired keyboard textures alongside jazz harmony and improvisation.

== Zimbabwe Jazz Community Trust ==
Marova is a founding member of the Zimbabwe Jazz Community Trust (ZJCT). In 2016, the organisation established Back 2 Jazzics, a live performance programme for established and developing jazz musicians. By 2020 more than 40 bands and solo performers had appeared through the programme.

The trust is also involved in organising the Zimbabwe Jazz Festival. Marova has held leadership roles within the organisation, including chair, and has been involved in its jazz programming.

== Discography ==
- Kariba Bream (2006)
- Hard Hat Area
- Nyanga Trout (2016)
- Zim Jazz Chapter 1 (2019)
- Mbiriano Style (2023)
- Metamorphosis (2025)

== Name ==
Marova's name has appeared under several spellings in published sources. Older reports about Frontline Kids variously refer to him as Philbert Marova and Philbert Marowa, while Filbert Marowa has also appeared in published coverage. Coverage of his later solo work generally uses Filbert Marova.
