= Nass Marrakech =

Gnawa music group

Nass Marrakech (Arabic: ناس مراكش) is a Gnawa music group formed in 1991. They introduced instruments foreign to Gnawa music such as the djembe, tam-tam, mandolin, tabla and Afro-Cuban percussion.

== Line up ==
- "Moulay Sherif"- Mandolin, oud, vocals and Krakebs.
- Abdeljalil Kodssi- Vocals and percussion.
- Abdelaziz Arradi- Vocals and sintir (traditional bass)

== Discography ==
Albums

- Bouderbala
- Sabil asalaam (Alula Records)

Contributing artist

- The Rough Guide to the Music of Morocco (2004, World Music Network)

== See also ==
- Music of Morocco
- Gnawa
