= Emmanuel Jal =

South Sudanese-Canadian rapper

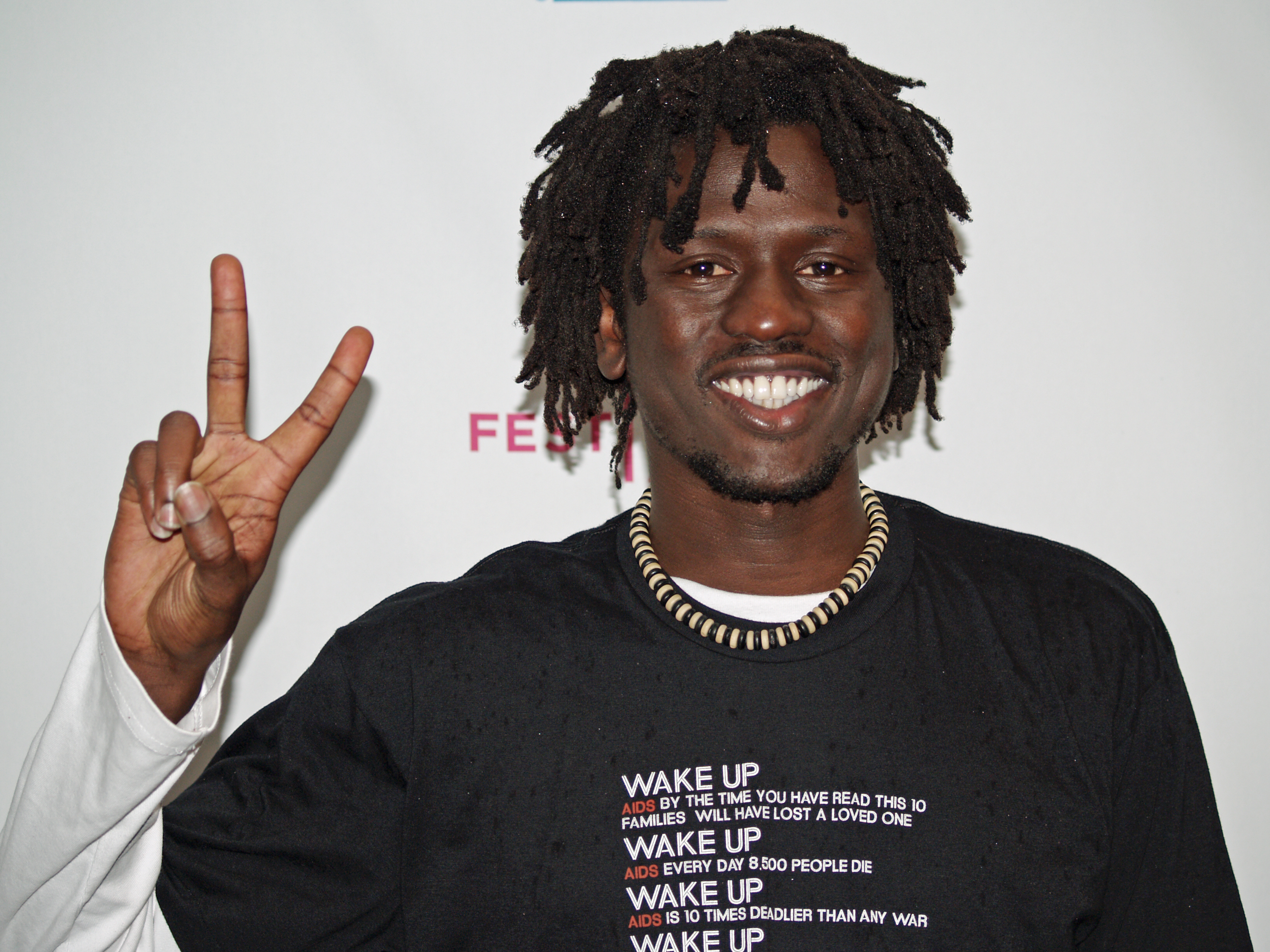

Background information
- Born: Jal Jok; Tonj, Democratic Republic of Sudan (today Tonj, South Sudan)
- Origin: Toronto, Ontario
- Genre: Hip-hop
- Occupations: Rapper; political activist; actor
- Instruments: Vocals
- Website: https://www.emmanueljal.com/

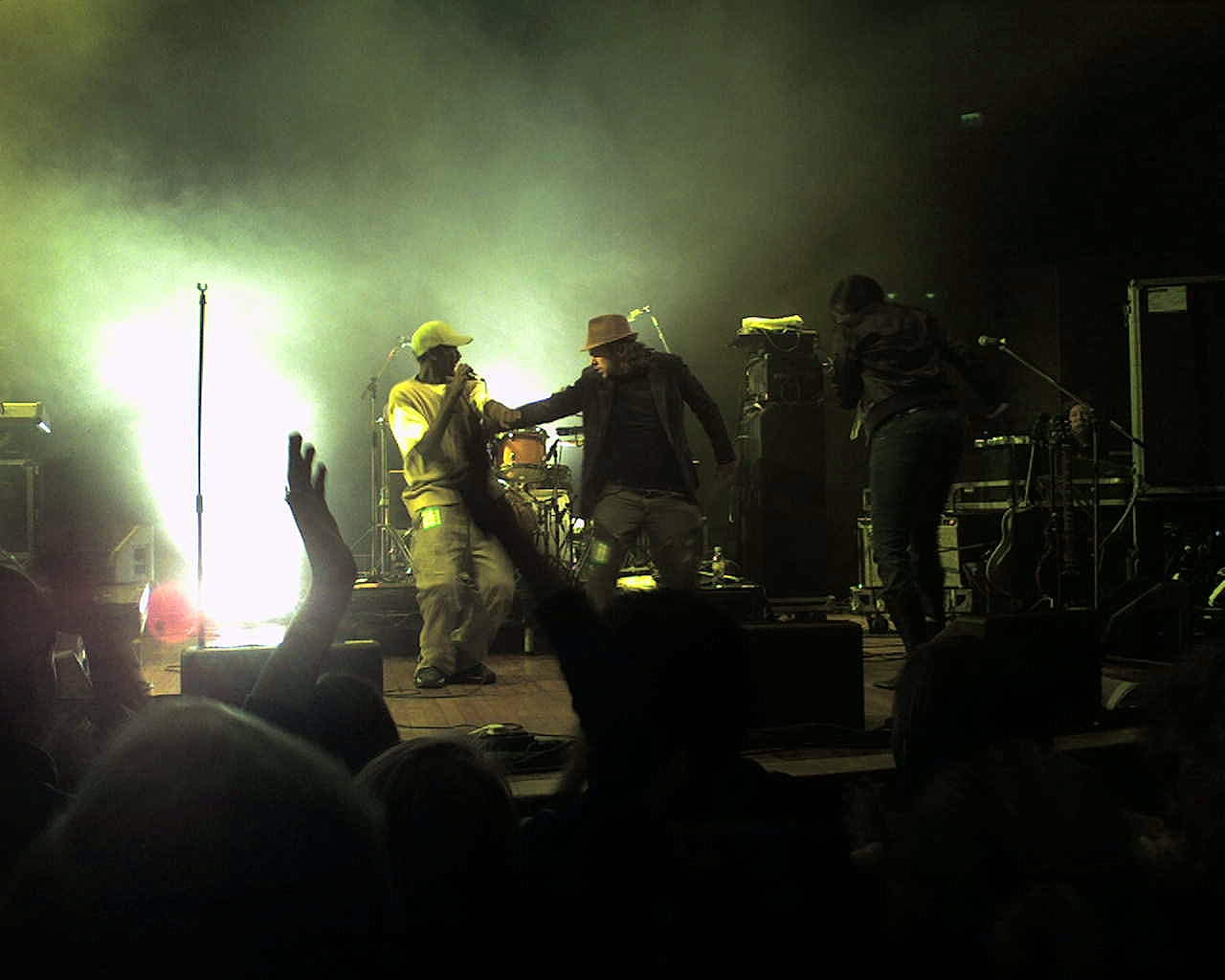
Emmanuel Jal (left in yellow) in concert in Bristol on 11 March 2006

Emmanuel Jal (born Jal Jok) is a South Sudanese-Canadian rapper, actor, author, former child soldier, and political activist. His autobiography, War Child: A Child Soldier's Story, was published in 2009.

== Childhood ==
Jal was born as Jal Jok to a Nuer family in the village of Tonj, Warrap State in the Bahr el Ghazal region of Sudan (now South Sudan). He does not know exactly when he was born, and records his date of birth as 1 January 1980.

Jal was a young child when the Second Sudanese Civil War broke out. His father joined the Sudan People's Liberation Army (SPLA). When Jal was roughly seven years old, his mother was killed by Sudanese government soldiers. He then decided to join the thousands of children travelling to Ethiopia seeking education and opportunity.

Along the way however, many of the children, Jal included, were recruited by the SPLA and taken to military training camps in the bush in Etwas disguised as a school in front of international aid agencies and UN representatives, but behind closed doors the children were training to fight.

Jal spent several years fighting with the SPLA in Ethiopia, until war broke out there too and the child soldiers were forced back into Sudan by the fighting and joined the SPLA's efforts to fight the government in the town of Juba. "Many kids there were so bitter, they wanted to know what happened to them. And we all wanted revenge."

When the fighting became unbearable Jal and some other children decided to run away. They were on the move for three months, with many dying on the way, until they reached the town of Waat, which was the headquarters of a small group that had separated themselves from the main SPLA.

In Waat, Jal met Emma McCune, a British aid worker married to senior SPLA commandant Riek Machar. Jal was only 11 years old then and McCune insisted he should not be a soldier. She adopted him and smuggled him to Kenya. There he attended school in Brookhouse International School in Nairobi. McCune died in a road accident a few months later, but her friends (Madeleine Bunting and Anna Ledgard) helped Jal to continue his studies. However, after McCune died, her husband Machar did not agree with Emmanuel staying with him, and he was forced to live in the slums (maybe before he came to Kileleshwa). He stayed in Kileleshwa with other refugees while attending Arboretum Sixth Form College.

== Music ==
With the help of a British aid worker (Emma McCune), Jal escaped into Kenya. But even that came with hardships as he lived for years in the slums. But Jal eventually stumbled upon hip-hop and discovered the genre harboured incredible power, both spiritual and political. While studying in Kenya, Jal started singing to ease the pain of what he had experienced. He also became very active in the community, raising money for local street children and refugees. With the encouragement of those around him like Gatkuoth Jal who has also gone through the same experience, Jal became increasingly involved in music and formed several groups. His first single, "All We Need Is Jesus", was a hit in Kenya and received airplay in the UK.

Through his music, Jal counts on the unity of the citizens to overcome ethnic and religious division and motivate the youth in Sudan. After escaping to Kenya, he fell in love with hip hop in the way that it identified issues being faced by the neighbourhood, which he was able to identify with in a unique manner. Although he lacked any music background or knowledge of its history, he felt that hip hop could provide the easiest and most effective vehicle to express his story and lobby for political change.

He went on to produce his first album, Gua, a mix of rap in Arabic, English, Swahili, Dinka and Nuer. The symbolism of unity is expressed in the title, meaning both "peace" in Nuer and "power" in Sudanese Arabic. His lyrics illustrate the desires of the Sudanese people to return to a peaceful, independent homeland. Although the only hip hop Jal had ever listened to was American, while he was in Kenya, the beat to "Gua" is not the usual American hip hop, but rather is strongly African. The title track, also called "Gua", was a number one hit in Kenya and featured on The Rough Guide to the Music of Sudan and Help: A Day in the Life, bringing together some of Britain's best known on a CD in aid of children in conflict zones (produced by War Child).

His next single, "War Child", mixes rap with soul to produce a world music vibe. He begins with telling his story through powerful lyrics; "I'm a war child / I believe I've survived for a reason / To tell my story, to touch lives." He continues the song with the narrative of his life and the pain inflicted upon him. "Written in English, Jal's second language, the new album [War-Child] may lack the poetic gymnastics of hip-hop's more fluent stars, but the plainness of the words – half-spoken, half-chanted over a mix of hip-hop and African-flavored choruses – keeps the focus on the story."

His second album, Ceasefire, was released in September 2005 and includes a re-recording of "Gua". This album is a collaboration with the well known Sudanese Muslim musician Abd El Gadir Salim and brings together opposing sides of the conflict, and different music traditions, to a common ground of the wish for peace in Sudan. The collaboration represents a vision for the future, as two Sudanese men, a Christian and a Muslim, unify and pave the way to overcome differences peacefully. Both musicians endured unimaginable adversity to become important figures, not only in music, but in the future of a country. They accentuate the differences between them and their musical styles, as a symbol of co-existence. The album preaches in four languages, encompasses every type of music in one, in an effort to transform the sound of hope into musical form. Ceasefire is not only the sound of two men collaborating on a musical project, but more symbolically, two-halves of a divided nation learning to trust each other. This album's version of "Gua" was played on the American television series ER at the very end of the Season 12 episode "There Are No Angels Here" (aired on 4 May 2006).

Among other places he performed at the Live 8 Concert in Cornwall in the summer of 2005. He was awarded a 2005 American Gospel Music Award for best international artist.

Jal's third album, Warchild, was released by Sonic360 Records in the UK on 12 May 2008. Jal, along with an all-star line-up featuring Amy Winehouse, Eddy Grant, Will Smith and others, performed songs at Nelson Mandela's 90th Birthday concert at London's Hyde Park on 27 June 2008.

Criticized for being steered into the mainstream and entering a conformist territory of hip-hop, Emmanuel says ""I'm not turning away from the world-music audience which has supported me," Jal says. "There's still an African influence in my music. I don't try to sound American. I rap like an African, because that's what I am. In the song 'Warchild,' I say I survived for a reason: to tell my story. I believe that. I feel a responsibility to do these songs and tell the world what is happening in my country."

Emmanuel Jal's album, See Me Mama, was released on 7 August 2012, via Jal's label, Gatwitch Records. See Me Mama was distributed by Universal Music Canada.

His newest album, Naath, a collaboration with his sister Nyaruach, was nominated for the 2019 Juno Award for World Music Album of the Year.

== Activism ==
Jal aims to protect the childhood of others through music. "Music is powerful. It is the only thing that can speak into your mind, your heart and your soul without your permission." Asked in an interview in a New Statesman magazine article if politics and art should mix, Jal answers: "When there is a need, they should mix. In times of war, starvation, hunger and injustice, such tragedy can only be put aside if you allow yourself to be uplifted through music, film and dance. It can be used to communicate messages to the masses and create awareness, to influence the people positively. A perfect example is Bob Marley: his message is still being heard today." Through his heartfelt lyrics, he opens the world up to the corruption and greed of the Sudanese government; central to the themes of his songs is the campaign for peace of opposing sides in Sudan and the clear message that children have no place in wars.

He has also passionately criticised the current state of hip hop culture in the United States. He sees hip hop as a vehicle to communicate an authentic message, rather than a space to pursue street credibility. "As well as simply being great songs, people are really getting into the lyrics, really understanding his message, and he is a great role model." He has expressed concern about the message being sent by American hip-hop artists, saying "American hip hop is still entwined with gang culture, drugs, sexual violence, and greed. It's a battleground." His song "50 Cent" speaks to the successful American rapper to change his violent messages, which have a destructive influence on children, as exemplified through his Bulletproof videogame. "You have done enough damage selling crack cocaine/now you got a 'kill a black man' video game/We have lost a whole generation through this lifestyle/now you want to put it in the game for a little child to play..." "The Roots and Jal set the hip-hop bar higher," wrote The Washington Post in 2008.

Emmanuel is a spokesman for the Make Poverty History campaign, the Coalition to Stop the Use of Child Soldiers and the Control Arms campaign. In 2008, Jal also got involved in the musical movement of spreading awareness about current slavery and human trafficking by performing various songs for the rockumentary, Call+Response.

A documentary about Emmanuel Jal called War Child was made in 2008 by C. Karim Chrobog and Interface Media Group. It made its international debut at the Berlin Film Festival and its North American debut at the Tribeca Film Festival, where it won the Cadillac Audience Award. An autobiography under the same name was released in 2009.

Despite his accomplishments in music, Jal's biggest passion is for Gua Africa, a charity that he founded. Besides building schools, the nonprofit provides scholarships for Sudanese war survivors in refugee camps, and sponsors education for children in the most deprived slum areas in Nairobi. The organisation's main mission is to work with individuals, families, and communities that have been affected by war and poverty. Based in both Sudan and Kenya, Gua Africa focuses on providing children and young adults with an education that would otherwise be unavailable to the majority. In April 2008 Gua Africa was granted full UK charity status and also received an NGO registration in South Sudan. In April 2011 they received NGO status in Kenya. Gua Africa is also one of three beneficiary charities of Emmanuel Jal's 'Lose to Win' challenge, with the other charities being the Africa Yoga Project and MyStart. As a musician, activist and general inspirational figure Emmanuel is challenging others to "lose" something to help others less fortunate to "win". He himself will be giving up his home and living as a modern-day nomad for the duration of the challenge.

Jal completed a 661-day "Lose to Win" fast to build a school in Leer, Southern Sudan, in Emma McCune's honour. From December 2008 to October 2010, the musician ate one meal per day, skipping his breakfasts and lunches to raise funds and awareness for the school, called Emma Academy.

Emmanuel Jal's most recent project is a Global Peace campaign called We Want Peace 2012. The project is a steady effort to inform the world that peace is a possibility. That genocide can be prevented through the power of music and activism. His message of peace was being promoted alongside his second studio album See Me Mama, released 2 October 2012. A percentage of the profits made from the album will be used to support Jal's charities.

On 25–27 April 2013, Emmanuel Jal was a featured speaker at "Lessons of the Birmingham Movement: A Symposium on Youth, Activism and the Struggle for Human Rights", hosted by the Birmingham Civil Rights Institute in Birmingham, Alabama. Jal will discuss the role of youth activists in current human rights struggles across the globe.

In 2014 he received the Dresden Peace Prize. In 2015 he launched a social enterprise The Key is E in partnership with Entrepreneur Paul Lindley . The Key is E uses education and entrepreneurship, to empower Africans. And give them access to funding and mentors. In 2015, the organisation launched 'The Key is E' documentary, Directed by Sebastian Thiel. This was premiered at One Young world.

== Discography ==
Solo albums

- 2004 – Gua – Independent
- 2005 – Ceasefire – Riverboat
- 2008 – Warchild – Sonic360
- 2010 – Emmanuel Jal's 4th Studio Album
- 2012 – See Me Mama – Gatwitch Records
- 2014 – The Key – Gatwitch Records
- 2022 – Shangah – Gatwitch Records

Collaborative albums

- 2018 - Naath, with Nyaruach - nominated for a 2019 Juno Award

Contributing artist

- 2005 – Help!: A Day in the Life – War Child
- 2005 – The Rough Guide to the Music of Sudan – World Music Network
- 2006 – Live 8 at Eden: Africa Calling – Emd Int'l
- 2007 – Instant Karma: The Amnesty International Campaign to Save Darfur – Amnesty International USA and Art for Amnesty
- 2010 – Sudan Votes Music Hopes – MICT
- 2010 – Sudan Votes Music Hopes REMIXED "kuar" remixes by Henrik Schwarz and Olof Dreijer (The Knife)
- 2013 – The Rough Guide to Acoustic Africa – 2013, World Music Network

== Filmography ==
Year	Film	Role	Genre
2008	War Child	Emmanuel Jal	Documentary
2010	Africa United	Tulu	Drama
2014	The Good Lie	Paul	Drama

== Book ==
War Child: A Child Soldier's Story. St. Martin's Press, 2009; St. Martin's Griffin, 2010 (paperback). ISBN 978-0-312-60297-0
