= The Rough Guide to Blues Revival =

2009 compilation album by various artists

Compilation album by Various artists
- Released: 21 April 2009
- Genre: World, blues
- Length: 101:03
- Label: World Music Network
- Producer: Phil Stanton

Full series chronology
The Rough Guide to Klezmer Revival (2008)	The Rough Guide to Blues Revival (2009)	The Rough Guide to Klezmer Revolution (2008)

The Rough Guide to Blues Revival is a blues compilation album released on 21 April 2009. Part of the World Music Network's Rough Guides series, the album consists of two discs. The first disc provides an overview of the contemporary blues scene, primarily featuring American artists. The second disc is a "bonus" album highlighting Malian musician Samba Touré, illustrating the musical connections between American blues and West African music.

The compilation was produced by Phil Stanton, co-founder of the World Music Network, and curated by music journalist Nigel Williamson, author of The Rough Guide to the Blues.

The term "blues revival" refers to the resurgence of the genre following the success of artists like Stevie Ray Vaughan.

== Critical reception ==
Jim Allen of AllMusic took issue with the title (claiming the genre "never went away") but named it a "pretty accurate sonic snapshot of the contemporary blues scene". He called the Malian choice for Disc Two "an interesting left-field touch".

== Track listing ==
=== Disc One ===
No.	Title	Artist (Country)	Length
1.	"How Deep in the Blues (Do You Want to Go)"	Robben Ford	4:21
2.	"Another Man Done Gone"	Irma Thomas	3:50
3.	"Ain't Got Time"	Eugene "Hideaway" Bridges	3:32
4.	"You Got to Move"	The Blind Boys of Alabama	3:33
5.	"Something Heavy"	Shemekia Copeland	3:18
6.	"Needed Time"	Eric Bibb	5:12
7.	"Monday Morning Blues"	Savoy Brown & Kim Simmonds	5:07
8.	"Lost in the Congo"	Doyle Bramhall	4:32
9.	"The Dream"	Deborah Coleman	4:03
10.	"Stealin All Day"	C. C. Adcock	4:15
11.	"Big Skaky"	Kelly Joe Phelps	4:49
12.	"Country Ghetto"	JJ Grey & MOFRO	4:02

=== Disc Two ===
All tracks on Disc Two are performed by Samba Touré, a guitarist from the Tombouctou Region of Mali. Although not related by blood, he was mentored by Ali Farka Touré and regarded as his protégé.

No.	Title	Length
1.	"Anbafo"	5:04
2.	"Ali Farka"	5:52
3.	"Mali Kadi"	5:19
4.	"Idje"	4:45
5.	"Man Ye Wogne"	4:50
6.	"Almoude Yona Toure"	4:40
7.	"Yawoye (live)"	2:12
8.	"Takamba (live)"	5:11
9.	"Anbafo (live Niafunke 2006)"	5:31
10.	"Foda Diakaina (instrumental)"	4:34
