= Sally Nyolo =

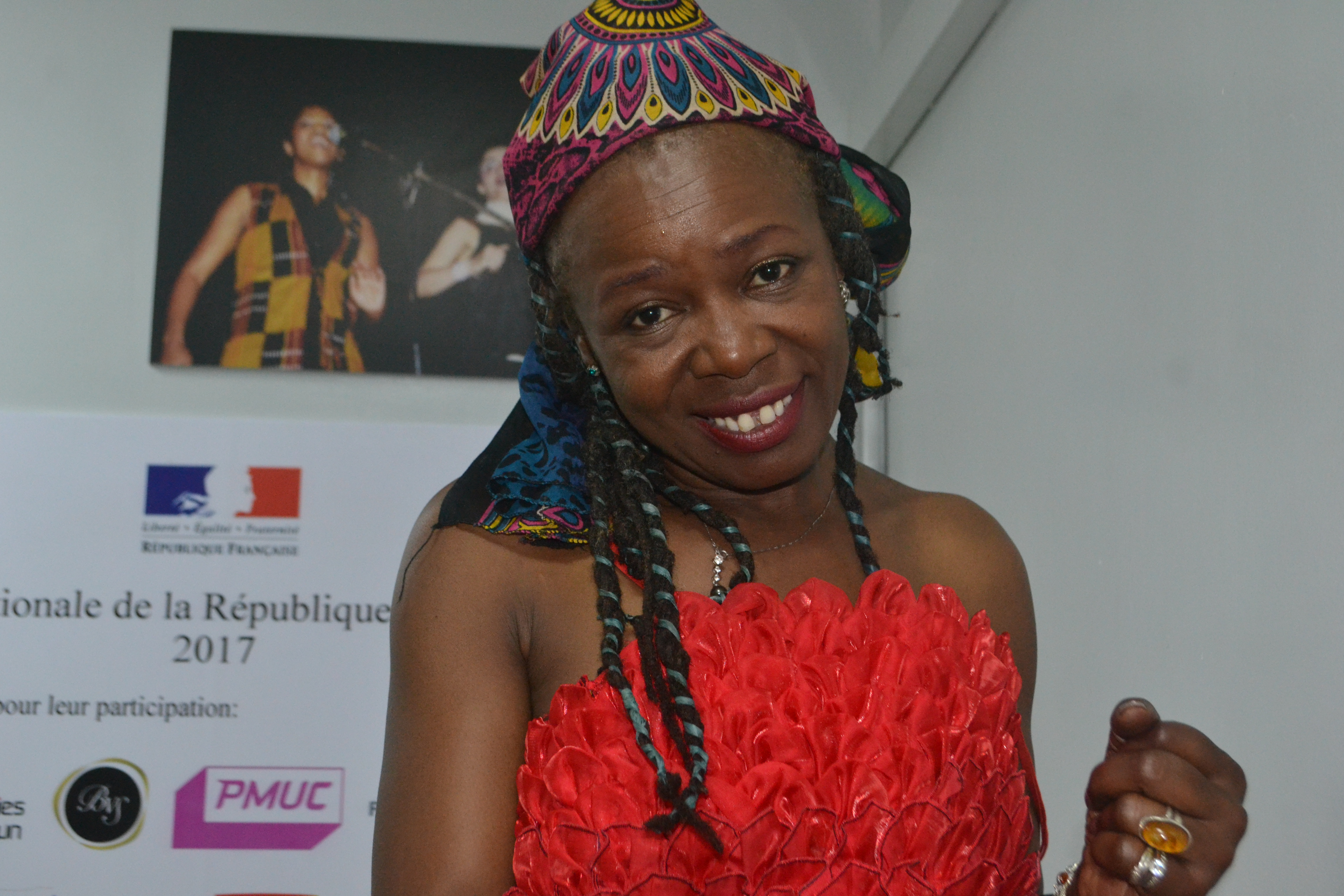
- Cameroonian singer Sally Nyolo in January 2018

Background information
- Born: 1965 (age 60–61); Lekié, Cameroon
- Origin: Paris, France
- Occupation: Singer
- Years active: 1982–present

Sally Nyolo (born 1965) is a Cameroonian singer. She worked as a backup singer and member of the Belgian group Zap Mama before recording her own solo albums, including Multiculti.

== Biography ==
Born in the Lekié region of Cameroon in 1965, Sally Nyolo left her homeland at the age of 13 to settle in Paris where she has lived since. Nyolo started her professional career in 1982, first as a backup-singer working with numerous French and African artists, and by composing music for radio and cinema.

In 1993, Nyolo joined the Belgian a cappella group Zap Mama for their world tour. With Zap Mama she recorded the album Sabsylma, and two live records (in Japan, and at Montreux).

In 1996, Nyolo recorded her first solo album, entitled Tribu (Tribe), published by the Lusafrica Label. The album, awarded by Radio France Internationale in 1997, sold over 300,000 copies.

After several other albums - Multiculti (1998), Beti (2000), Zaione (2002) - Nyolo finally returned to her native Cameroon, where she set up a studio, with the intention to explore and develop the local music scene. "I intend to sell the Cameroonian culture abroad by creating an international music association which will link young Cameroonian musicians to other artists around the world, " she said. This effort resulted in the album Studio Cameroon, published in 2006 by World Music Network.

In 2014, Nyolo collaborated with COPILOT Music and Sound on a cover of Carlinhos Brown's "Maria Caipirnha (Samba da Bahia)”. The arrangement represented the musical instrumentation and styles of Cameroon for Visa's "Samba of the World", a digital campaign for the 2014 FIFA World Cup.

Nyolo sings in French, Arabic, English, Spanish, and her native Eton. In her music, she mixes styles and rhythms, fusing forest sounds with urban beats. The Boston Herald stated, "Nyolo has gone out of her way to blend West Africa with cosmopolitan Paris."

== Discography ==
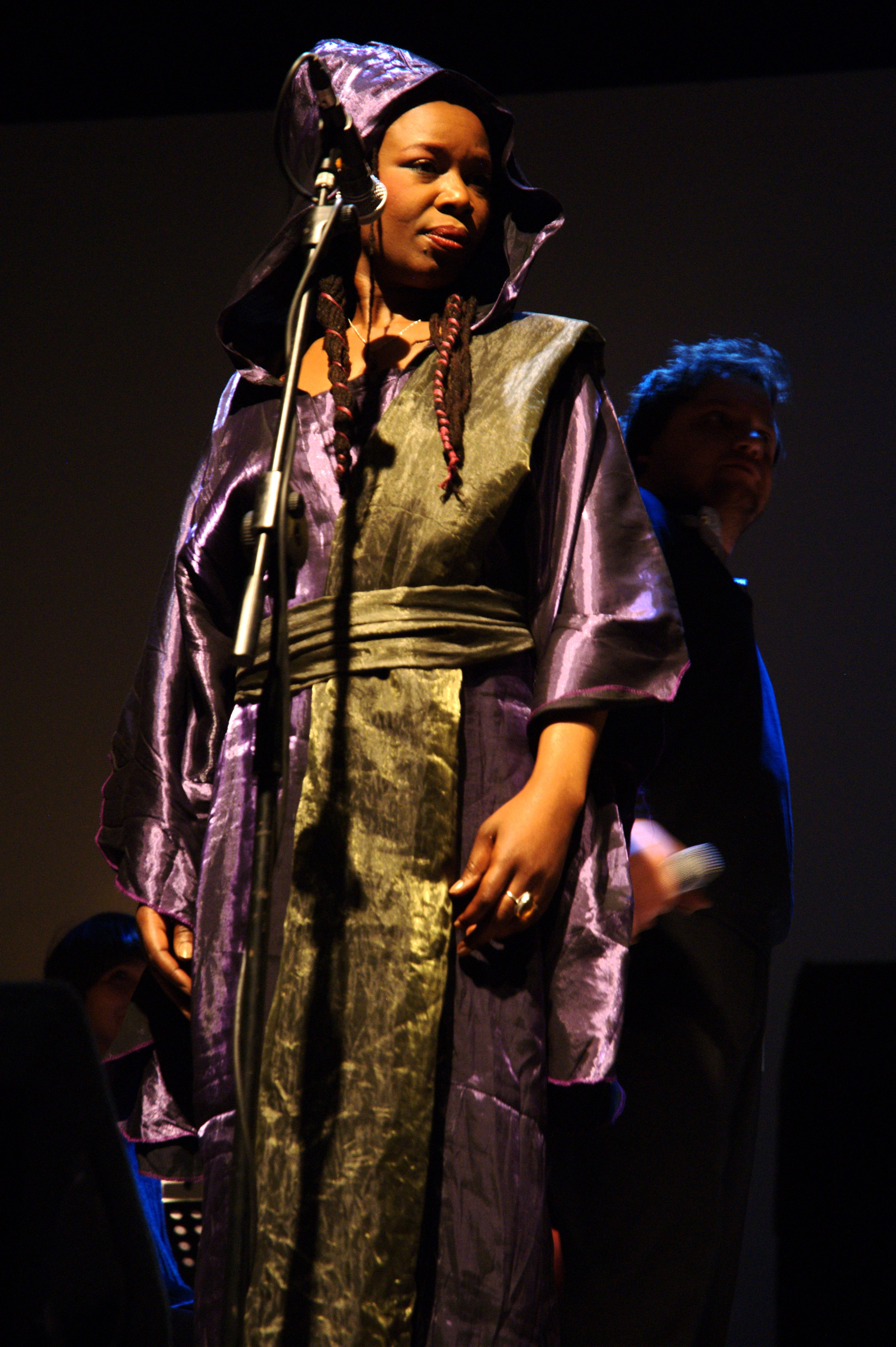
Sally Nyolo 2008

Solo albums

- Tribu (1996)
- Multiculti (1998)
- Beti (2000)
- Zaione (2002)
- Studio Cameroon (2006)
- Memoire du Monde (2007)
- La Nuit a Febe (2011)
- Tiger Run (2014)

Contributing artist

- The Rough Guide to Acoustic Africa (2013, World Music Network)
