= Mabulu =

Musical band from Mozambique

- Origin: Mozambique
- Genres: Marrabenta, Soukous, Jazz, Swing, African
- Members: Lisboa Matavel, Chiquito, Chonyl, Mr Arssen, António Marcos, Alberto Mutcheca, Dilon Djindji, Moreira Chonguiça, Ernesto Ndzevo,

Mabulu is a band from Mozambique. Their name means "looking for a dialogue" in the Shangana language - a reference to the fact that the group comprises members from different generations.

Formed in 2000, their debut release was "Karimbo" but the recording of their first album in March that year was seriously affected by the heavy rains and cyclones along the Mozambican coast. In solidarity with the thousands of victims of the floods, they instead performed for disaster relief efforts. Their second release, Soul Marrabenta (Riverboat), came a year later.

Lead singer Chonyl died in Maputo in September 2007, aged 27.

== Discography ==
Albums

- Karimbo
- Soul Marrabenta

Contributing artist

- The Rough Guide to Acoustic Africa (2013, World Music Network)
