= The Rough Guide to the Music of Ethiopia =

The Rough Guide to the Music of Ethiopia refers to two albums by the World Music Network:

- The Rough Guide to the Music of Ethiopia (2004 album), focusing on music of the 1960s
- The Rough Guide to the Music of Ethiopia (2012 album), focusing on music of the 21st century
