= Hope Masike =

Hope
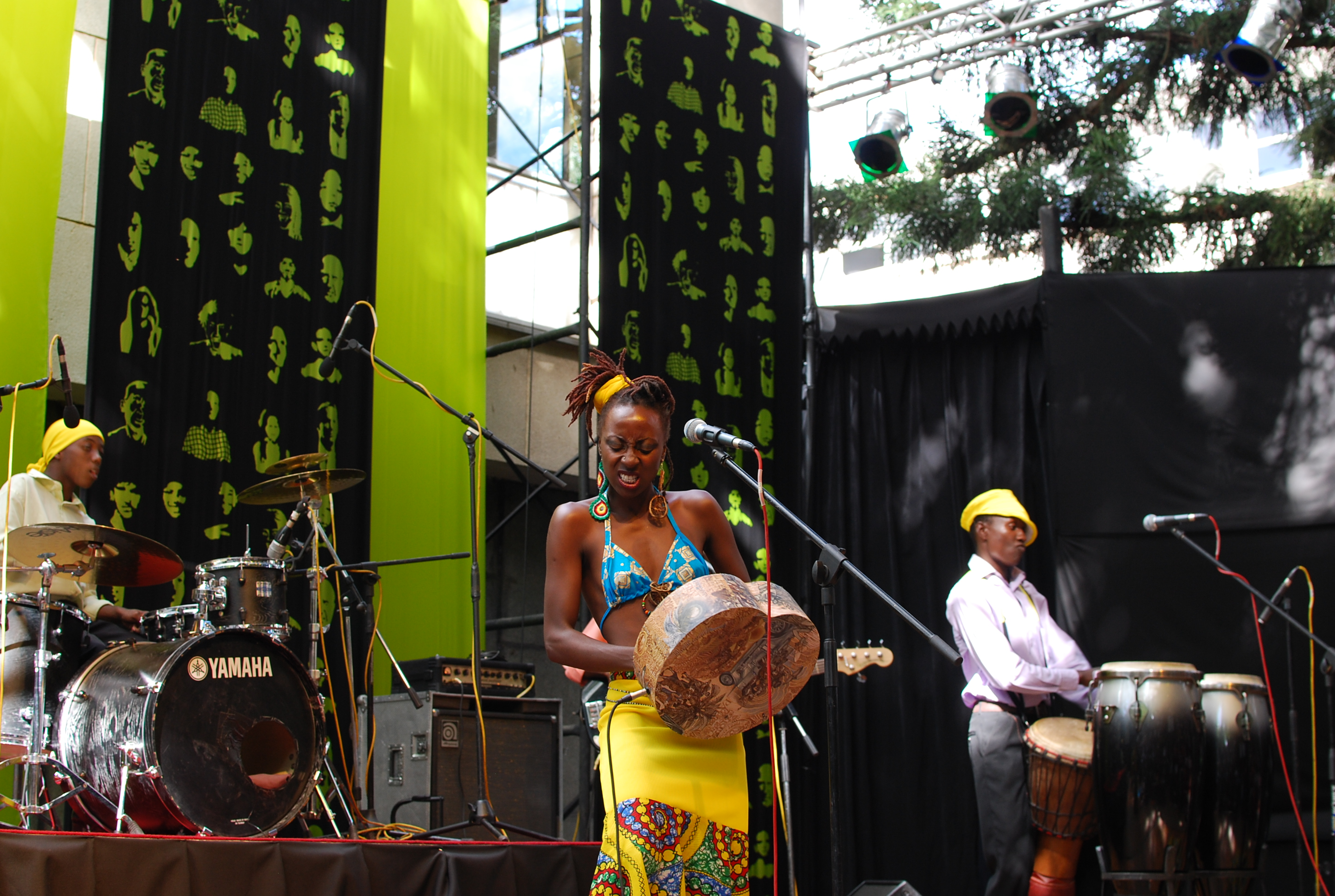
- Hope Masike at Harare International Festival of the Arts, 2010

Background information
- Born: Ruvimbo Hope Masike; September 9, 1984 (age 42)
- Origin: Harare, Zimbabwe
- Genres: Afro-Pop; Afro-Jazz; Jazz
- Occupations: Singer, Mbira player
- Instruments: Vocals, Mbira
- Years active: 2007–present
- Website: hopemasike.co.zw

Ruvimbo Hope Masike, professionally known as Hope Masike (born 9 September 1984) is a Zimbabwean musician and dancer. She is known as "The Princess of Mbira" and her music has its roots both in traditional and modern African culture. Hope is also the lead singer for Monoswezi. She initially studied fine art at Harare Polytechnic.

== Biography ==
Hope graduated from the Zimbabwe College of Music where she studied ethnomusicology at Zimbabwe College of Music and later had a breakthrough in the music industry in 2008. Hope's music is influenced by African culture, including Francophone and Lusophone Africa. It is important to her to maintain African culture in music, but to also "update it" in order to keep it relevant to her audiences. She is known as "The Princess of Mbira." As of 2022, she was studying for a Master of Philosophy in Art with Arrupe Jesuit University in Harare and also studying French with the Alliance Française de Harare.

Masike was the first winner in the Outstanding Female Musician category for the Zimbabwe National Arts Merit Awards (NAMA) in 2013. In 2016, she was again nominated in the category of Outstanding Female Musician for NAMA and was also nominated for Best Video for the KORA Awards. She was selected as a Onebeat Fellow in 2014. Hope was cast as the lead in a theatrical musical drama called Bongile which was adapted from a book of the same title written by Chiedza Makwara

== Discography ==
=== Albums ===
- Hope (2009)
- Mbira, Love & Chocolate (2012)
- The Exorcism of a Spinster (Riverboat Records/ World Music Network, 2019)

=== Monoswezi Albums ===
- The Village (2013)
- Monoswezi Yenga (2015)
- A Je (2017)

=== Single ===
- Kwira Gomo (2016)
- Ndinewe (Blah Ent, 2016)
- Idenga (Riverboat Records/ World Music Network, 2019)

=== Collaborations ===
- Boombap Idiophonics with DJ Oil and The Monkey Nuts (2015)
- Zenzele" with Mahube (2018)

== Awards ==
Year	Awards/Nominations
2013	National Arts Merit Awards (NAMA) - Nomination for Outstanding Female Musician
2015	National Arts Merit Awards (NAMA) - Winner for Best Music Video 'Huyai Tinamate'
2016	KORA - Nomination for Best Video 'Huyai Tinamate'
2018	National Arts Merit Awards (NAMA) - Nomination for Outstanding Screen Production - Full Length Film 'One Woman and Her Mbira'
2018	Zimbabwe's Achievers Awards - Nomination for International Music Artist
