= The Rough Guide to Greek Café =

The Rough Guide To Greek Café

Compilation album by Various artists
- Released: 30 August 2010
- Genre: World, Greek
- Length: 122:15
- Label: World Music Network

Full series chronology
The Rough Guide to Latin Funk (2007)	The Rough Guide To Greek Café (2010)	The Rough Guide to the Music of Hungarian Gypsies (2008)

The Rough Guide to Greek Café is a world music compilation album originally released in 2010. Part of the World Music Network Rough Guides series, the release covers a wide breadth of the music of Greece on Disc One, from traditional to modern. Disc Two highlights Dimitris Mistakidis. The album was compiled by Marc Dubin, a journalist specializing in Greece for the past three decades. Brad Haynes coordinated the project, Laurence Cedar mastered the work, and Phil Stanton was the producer.

== Critical reception ==
Professional ratings
Review scores
Source	Rating
PopMatters	7/10 stars
AllMusic	4/5 stars

The album received generally positive reviews upon release. Both Chris Nickon of AllMusic and Deanne Sole of PopMatters noted the use of the word "café". Nickson described the title as somewhat of a "misnomer" and the compilation instead as "an introduction to Greek music, and a very good one" showing that Greek music is "richly alive". Sole wrote that the compiler "favours forward movement", that "hardness is allowed", and that if it is indeed a "café" soundtrack, it is one "for mobs of 19th-century European aesthetes".

== Track listing ==
=== Disc one ===
No.	Title	Artist	Length
1.	"Sto Patihraki"	Kristi Stassinopoulou	2:59
2.	"Athivoles"	Hainides	4:27
3.	"Ilie Mou Iliaki Mou"	Papa-Anastasis	5:48
4.	"Thalassa Lypisou"	En Chordais	3:49
5.	"Andras Pou Den Ekatehe"	Psarantonis	5:11
6.	"Pehlivanis"	Thanasis Papakonstantinou	4:53
7.	"Kelome Se Gongila"	Nena Venetsanou	2:13
8.	"Hilia Prosopa"	Sokratis Malamas & Melina Kana	2:46
9.	"Kanarini Mou Glyko"	Dilek Koç	4:23
10.	"Maisa Selini"	Nikos Papazoglou	3:45
11.	"Rixte Sto Yiali Farmaki"	Sofia Papazoglou	5:25
12.	"Kontrabatzidhes"	Lesvos Aiolis	3:08
13.	"Dos Mou Piso Ta Louloudhia"	Apsilies	5:44
14.	"Tatvla"	Mode Plagal & Vosporos	7:45
15.	"Ston Eptalofo"	Himerinoi Kolimvites	2:11

=== Disc two ===
All tracks on Disc Two are performed by Dimitris Mistakidis, a rebetika guitarist.

No.	Title	Length
1.	"Stin Ipoga"	6:19
2.	"O Seretis"	2:45
3.	"Vouno Me Vouno"	4:52
4.	"Mes' Ton Teke Tis Marigos"	4:12
5.	"Dertilidiko"	2:47
6.	"Erinaki"	3:22
7.	"Gkiousel"	2:48
8.	"O Bekris"	3:25
9.	"Efoumername Ena Vradi"	3:46
10.	"Trouba"	3:40
11.	"Kontrabatzides"	4:46
12.	"To Koukli Tis Kokkinias"	3:13
13.	"To Servikaki"	2:53
14.	"Teketzis"	3:02
15.	"To Pedi Tou Dromou"	3:11
16.	"Partides"	2:47
