= Monoswezi =

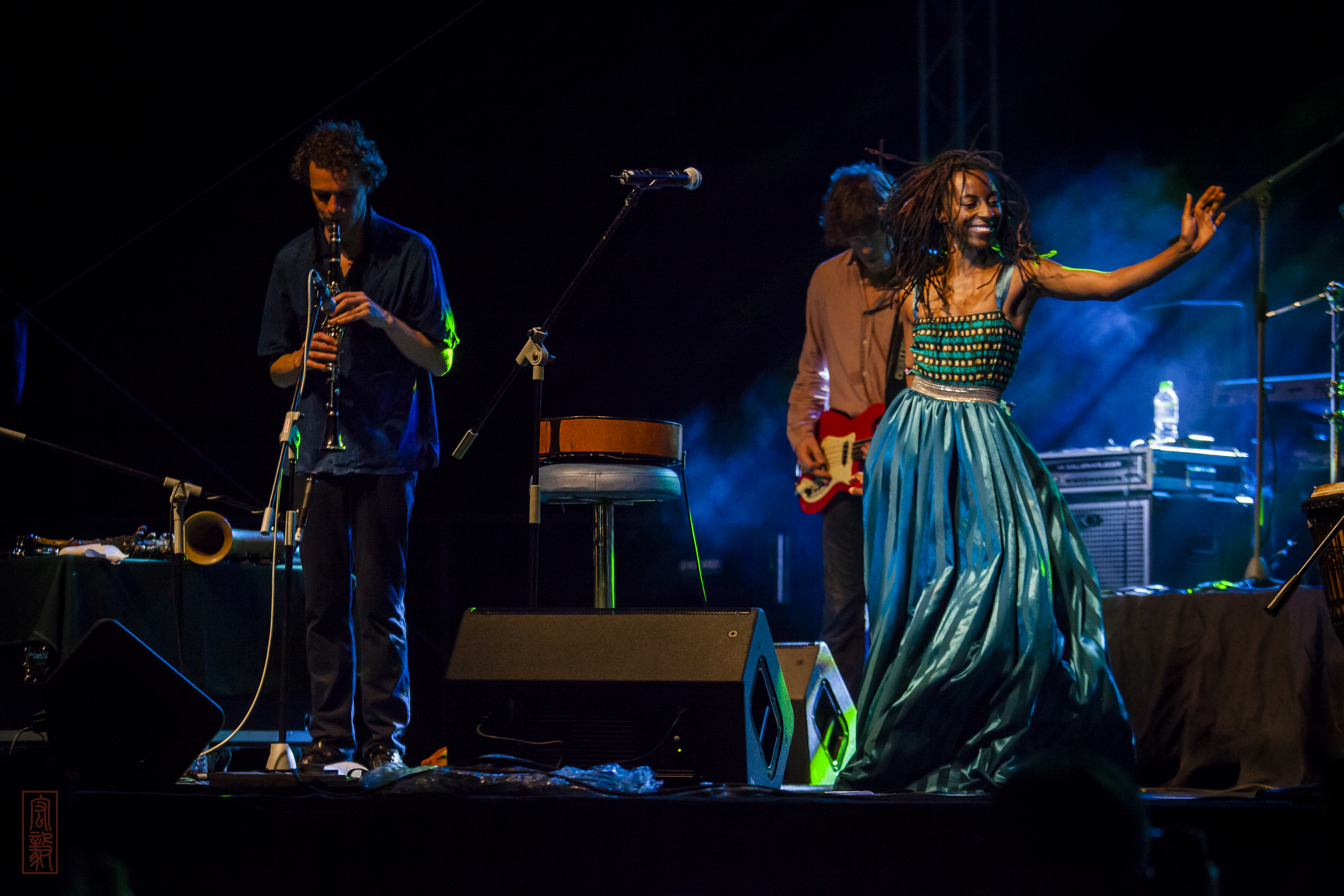
- 20141206-Penang Island Jazz Festival – Bay view Beach Resort2451

Background information
- Origin: Mozambique, Norway, Sweden, Zimbabwe
- Genres: Jazz; Traditional Zimbabwean; African; Scandinavian
- Years active: 2008 – present
- Label: Riverboat Records
- Members: Hope Masike; Calu Tsemane; Hallvard Godal; Putte Johander; Erik Nylander
- Website: www.monoswezi.com

Monoswezi is a trans-national music collective composed of Hope Masike (voice, mbira, percussion), Calu Tsemane (voice, percussion), Hallvard Godal (saxophone, clarinet, harmonium), Putte Johander (bass), and Erik Nylander (drums, percussion). The band's name is a portmanteau from the first few letters of the members’ respective nationalities: Mozambique, Norway, Sweden and Zimbabwe. Monoswezi is also a combination of the Greek word “mono”, meaning “one”, and “swezi”, which means “world” in a native South African dialect. Their music has been classified as a fusion between Scandinavian and African music, under the expansive “jazz” umbrella.

The band was born out of a cultural exchange program between Africa and Norway back in 2008, when Godal lived in Mozambique and met Tsemane. Soon after, Tsemane and Masike connected with Godal back in Norway and began making music together. Since then the band has produced 3 albums under Riverboat Records and tours internationally. Their first album, The Village, was nominated for the Songlines Music Awards in 2014.

== Discography ==
=== Albums ===
- 2026 Moyo
- 2021 Shanu
- 2017 A Je
- 2015 Monoswezi Yenga
- 2013 The Village
