= The Rough Guide to the Music of Morocco (2004 album) =

Compilation album by Various artists
- Released: 3 February 2004
- Genre: World, Moroccan
- Length: 71:08
- Label: World Music Network

Full series chronology
The Rough Guide to the Music of the Balkans (2003)	The Rough Guide to the Music of Morocco (2004)	The Rough Guide to the Music of Central Asia (2005)

The Rough Guide to the Music of Morocco is a world music compilation album originally released in 2004. Part of the World Music Network Rough Guides series, the release covers the music of Morocco, which had been receiving new-found attention on the world music circuit in the early 2000s. The compilation was curated by Andy Morgan, former manager of Tinariwen and organizer of the Festival in the Desert. Phil Stanton, co-founder of the World Music Network, was the producer. This album was followed by a second edition, which covered the same topic by showcasing different artists.

== Critical reception ==
Professional ratings
Review scores
Source	Rating
Robert Christgau	A-
AllMusic	4.5/5 stars

The compilation's release was met with positive reviews. Robert Christgau described "minimal" tunes and spare textures, noting inconsistency from track to track. This diversity was praised by AllMusic's Adam Greenberg, who called the curative decision to include all major genres "admirable".

== Track listing ==
No.	Title	Artist	Length
1.	"Zeye Meyel"	Nass Marrakech	6:05
2.	"Baba Aadi"	Jil Jilala	6:58
3.	"Bay-Bay"	Najm El Farah Essafi	6:20
4.	"Leilaa Lill"	B'net Marrakech	6:58
5.	"Touria"	Mohamed Amenzou	6:47
6.	"Mahmouna"	Nass El Ghiwane	8:51
7.	"Yedidim Hiou Zehirim"	Emil Zrihan	5:45
8.	"Hijra"	Dar Gnawa & U-Cef	5:31
9.	"Taala Fine Ghadi"	Fatna Bent El Houcine & Ouled Ben Aguida	4:47
10.	"Lala Aisha"	Hassan Hakmoun	6:07
11.	"Khaliou Loudid Lamimtou"	Mustapha Bourgogne	6:59
