= The Rough Guide to Bhangra (2010 album) =

Compilation album by Various artists
- Released: 30 August 2010
- Genre: World, Bhangra
- Length: 120:38
- Label: World Music Network

Full series chronology
The Rough Guide to African Street Party (2008)	The Rough Guide to Bhangra (2010)	The Rough Guide to Klezmer Revival (2008)

The Rough Guide to Bhangra is a world music compilation album originally released in 2010. Part of the World Music Network Rough Guides series, the release features bhangra, a form of Punjabi music. Disc One highlights artists from the 1980s to 2000s, and Disc Two features the British band Achanak. The album was compiled by DJ Ritu, a British-born musician, BBC Radio 3 host, and co-founder of Outcaste Records. Brad Haynes coordinated the project, Laurence Cedar mastered the work, and Phil Stanton was the producer. The release was preceded by a first edition a decade earlier.

The album features artists from India, Pakistan, England, and Scotland.

== Critical reception ==
Writing for BBC Music, Vibhuti Patel was dismissive of the album and label in general, calling it "more than a little rough", and the brand responsible for "several entry-level collections of world music" (this being the 202nd release in the series). Patel thought the album should be an historical overview, and lamented the omissions of Gurdas Maan, Malkit Singh, and B21. She also felt Disc Two should have been replaced by another various artist compilation, and wrote that the overall release "falls short of being a definitive introduction" (this is in marked contrast with the first edition, which Ted Swedenburg of PopMatters named "the definitive introduction").

== Track listing ==
=== Disc One ===
No.	Title	Artist	Length
1.	"Gerra De De"	DJ Dips Feat Miss Pooja	3:58
2.	"Meri Changi Taran"	Naseebo Lal	7:56
3.	"Boliyan"	Panjabi MC	4:10
4.	"Bangles"	Niraj Chag	4:02
5.	"Bol! Bol! Bol!"	Tigerstyle	4:23
6.	"Yaar Da Viah"	Dalvinder Singh	4:24
7.	"Dil Kugoo (Bhangra Mix)"	Shazia Mansoor	5:08
8.	"Nachle"	U Music	4:29
9.	"Mera Yaar Vajawe Dhol"	K.S. Bamrah	3:37
10.	"Bor Bor"	Partners In Rhyme	4:31
11.	"Tut Guhia"	Achanak	3:55
12.	"Fight This Feeling"	Khiza Feat Suman & Joginder	3:14
13.	"Har Gabroo"	H-Dhami	3:55
14.	"Jagoo"	Panjabi By Nature	5:29

=== Disc Two ===
All tracks on Disc Two are performed by Achanak, a seven-piece British band founded in 1989.

No.	Title	Length
1.	"Teri Muhabbeta Mar Sutia (Your Love Is Killing Me)"	3:24
2.	"Tut Guhia (Broken Jewelry)"	3:58
3.	"Iskh Mitta (Love Is Sweet)"	5:12
4.	"Dil Nao Lag Da (Ambient)"	4:49
5.	"Lak Noo Bhangra Mix (Purely Percussive)"	4:45
6.	"Aj Bhangra Punjabia Na Pauna (Let's Dance With A Dhol)"	3:56
7.	"Addji Marke (Let's Move Our Hips To The Pulsating Beat)"	4:28
8.	"Nakra D&B Mix (Heavy)"	5:24
9.	"Ek Tera Na Rkana (Dancing Queen)"	4:55
10.	"Dushman Da Badla (Freedom From Oppression)"	3:56
11.	"Achanak Boliyaan (Sonnets Of Dance)"	5:02
12.	"Bhangra Pa Bass Mix (Let Me Dance Please)"	2:53
13.	"Kuria Ne Suniya (Beautiful Woman Listen To Me)"	4:54
