= The Rough Guide to African Disco =

The Rough Guide To African Disco

Compilation album by Various artists
- Released: 15 April 2013
- Genres: World, African pop, disco
- Length: 96:56
- Label: World Music Network

Full series chronology
The Rough Guide to Arabic Revolution (2013)	The Rough Guide To African Disco (2013)	The Rough Guide to Acoustic Africa (2013)

The Rough Guide to African Disco is a world music compilation album originally released in 2013 featuring mainly 1970s and '80s African disco. Part of the World Music Network Rough Guides series, the album contains two discs: an overview of the genre on Disc One, and a "bonus" Disc Two highlighting Cameroonian artist Maloko. Disc One features five South African tracks, four Nigerian, two Ghanaian, and one each from Cameroon and France. The release was compiled by Dominic Raymond-Barker and Phil Stanton, co-founder of the World Music Network.

== Critical reception ==
Professional ratings
Review scores
Source	Rating
MSN Music (Expert Witness)	A-
PopMatters	6/10 stars
Time Out	4/5 stars

Gregory Heaney of AllMusic called the album "solid" and praised the World Music Network for increasing the world's funkiness. Robert Christgau rewarded the release with an "A−", saying it succeeded in finding the balance between "cheap commercialism and heartfelt ambition." While "The Dean" waxed poetic on Disc Two, David Maine of PopMatters pronounced it a stab at "accessibility for western ears" fallen flat. He did however call the "Afro-funk" and "Afro-pop" of Disc One worth exploring. Writing for TimeOut, Lydia Jenkin labelled the album "stunning".

== Track listing ==
=== Disc One ===
No.	Title	Artist (Country)	Length
1.	"A Brand New Wayo"	Mixed Grill (Nigeria)	5:01
2.	"Yesu San Bra"	Pat Thomas (Ghana)	3:51
3.	"Come On Home"	The Lijadu Sisters (Nigeria)	5:16
4.	"Kazet"	Mahlathini and the Mahotella Queens (South Africa)	3:46
5.	"Kwedini"	Yvonne Chaka Chaka (South Africa)	4:36
6.	"Ohue"	Sir Victor Uwaifo (Frankie Francis & Simbad edit) (Nigeria)	5:37
7.	"Be Africa"	Bibi Tanga & The Selenites (Central African Republic) (France)	4:15
8.	"Yekey Tenge"	Manu Dibango (Cameroon)	5:57
9.	"Dance The Body Music"	Osibisa (Ghana)	3:48
10.	"Tsa-oo"	Mango Groove (South Africa)	4:15
11.	"Oh Yeh Soweto"	Teaspoon & The Waves (South Africa)	4:14
12.	"Love Is A Natural Thing"	Tony Allen & The Afro Messengers (Nigeria)	9:08
13.	"ToiToi"	Marumo (South Africa)	3:38

=== Disc Two ===
Disc Two is a re-release of Maloko's Soul on Fire.

No.	Title	Length
1.	"In The Midnight Hour (Medley I)"	4:02
2.	"Stand By Me"	3:22
3.	"Wonderful World"	4:28
4.	"Words of Love"	2:39
5.	"In The Midnight Hour (Medley II)"	4:24
6.	"Direct Me"	5:51
7.	"Soul Man"	3:45
8.	"Cold Sweat"	5:02
