= Multiculti (album) =

Studio album by Sally Nyolo
- Released: 1998
- Label: Lusafrica; Tinder
- Producer: Sally Nyolo

Sally Nyolo chronology
Tribu (1996)	Multiculti (1998)	Beti (2000)

Multiculti is the second album by the Cameroonian musician Sally Nyolo, released in 1998. The title track was a hit in France. Nyolo supported the album with a North American tour.

== Production ==
The album was produced by Nyolo, who also wrote and arranged the songs. She sang in Eton, Arabic, French, Spanish, and English. Many of the songs are about growing up in the Cameroonian forest; others were inspired by living near a school, in Paris . It was Nyolo's intention to promote to a wide audience the bikutsi style of her homeland. Multiculti was recorded with help from Nyolo's former bandmates in Zap Mama, as well as Afro-French studio musicians.

== Critical reception ==
Professional ratings
Review scores
Source	Rating
Robert Christgau	(neither)
Edmonton Journal	4/5 stars
MusicHound World: The Essential Album Guide	4/5 stars
The Sydney Morning Herald	3.5/5 stars

JazzTimes called the album "suave and funk-lined, urbane and rootsy all at once," writing that "hybridizing is the operative process and philosophy on the album, including the title cut’s seductive Afro-Parisian-hip-hop feel." The Los Angeles Times deemed it "a delightful collection of acoustic music surging with the body-bending bikutsi rhythms of Cameroon, topped by Nyolo's crisp, melodic vocal harmonies." The San Diego Union-Tribune wrote: "Subtle yet rhythmic, her multilayered music boasts buoyant melodies, darting talking-drum accents and intricate call-and-response vocal exchanges."

The Edmonton Journal stated: "Heavy with hand percussion, bass and click guitar lines, it's spritely, uptempo music with choppy rhythms, thicker and less obviously influenced by western pop than say, Angelique Kidjo, but entirely entrancing either way." Rolling Stone praised the combination of "energized bikutsi dance rhythms with poetic storytelling." The Times noted that Nyolo "creates a rich African tapestry drawing on tribal chants and ambient sounds."

== Track listing ==
No.	Title	Length
1.	"Ndong (Interlude)"
2.	"Djini Djome"
3.	"Multiculti"
4.	"Make Up"
5.	"Bingo Bingole"
6.	"Semengue"
7.	"Foret (Interlude)"
8.	"Songuisseto"
9.	"Reggae in Japan"
10.	"Ibandouma"
11.	"Nkole (Téléphone) (Interlude)"
12.	"Ikaatiridong"
13.	"Solidarity"
14.	"Ngoni Ngueng"
15.	"Histoire (Interlude)"
