= Rhythm-Time: World Percussion =

Compilation album by Various artists
- Released: 22 June 1999
- Genre: World, Percussion
- Length: 74:08
- Label: World Music Network

Full series chronology
The Rough Guide to World Music: Africa, Europe and the Middle East (1999)	Rhythm-Time: World Percussion (1999)	The Rough Guide to the Music of the Gypsies (1999)

Rhythm-Time: World Percussion is a world music compilation album originally released in 1999. Part of the World Music Network Rough Guides series, the release features percussion, ranging from Brazilian batucada to Japanese taiko music. The compilation was produced by Phil Stanton, co-founder of the World Music Network, in partnership with New Internationalist magazine.

Countries represented in this compilation include South Africa, Cuba, Ghana, Zimbabwe, Brazil, Senegal, The Gambia, Egypt, Morocco, Italy, Nigeria, India and Japan.

== Critical reception ==
Professional ratings
Review scores
Source	Rating
AllMusic	3/5 stars

Tom Schulte of AllMusic called the package "unassuming" and the tracks a "veritable treasure of world music rhythms".

== Track listing ==
No.	Title	Artist (Country)	Length
1.	"Giya Kasiamore"	Amampondo & Airto Moreira (South Africa) (Brazil)	7:51
2.	"Mahakal"	Megadrums (United Nations)	3:12
3.	"Conga Sin Palabras"	Sin Palabras (Cuba)	4:00
4.	"Elegguá"	Los Muñequitos de Matanzas (Cuba)	3:16
5.	"Wo Ba Wo Ba Shue"	Nyanyo Addo (Ghana)	6:04
6.	"Chemutengure"	Dumisani Maraire & Ephat Mujuru (Zimbabwe)	5:58
7.	"Felix"	Arakatuba & Faze Action (Brazil) (United Kingdom)	7:48
8.	"Reuss/Tatou Laubé"	Mapathe Diop (Senegal)	2:23
9.	"Gis Gis"	Ifang Bondi (The Gambia)	4:32
10.	"Halawa Ya"	Mahmoud Fadl (Egypt)	2:48
11.	"Trance Beat"	Hassan Erraji & Arabesque (Morocco) (Germany)	3:40
12.	"Tarantella d'A Fatica"	Tamburi del Vesuvio (Italy)	3:55
13.	"Fuji Dr. Ewon"	Fuji Dub (Nigeria)	6:18
14.	"Lenguasá"	Pancho Quinto (Cuba)	4:49
15.	"Element"	Joji Hirota (Japan)	5:09
16.	"Konnakkol (Percussion Language)"	Karnataka College of Percussion (India)	2:25
