= Invisible System =

Invisible System is the pseudonym for the UK & Africa producer Dan Harper whose music involves a fusion of Ethiopian, dub, reggae, techno, trance, drum and bass, jungle, acid, psychedelic, folk, post-punk, goth and rock.

They have played at the Addis Ababa Music Festival, Ethiopia. Endorset Festival, UK. Thimbleberry Festival, supported the UK bands Dreadzone, The Beat, The Dub Pistols, Jah Wobble and also played Music Port Festival, Waveform Festival and Glastonbury Festival.

== Albums ==
Punt (Made in Ethiopia) was released in 2009. Guest musicians included Mahmoud Ahmed, Captain Sensible, Aklilu Bedane, Justin Adams, Dubulah, Juldeh Camara, Desta Fikra, Ozric Tentacles, and others.

The album has been played on BBC's World Service, Late Junction and Asian Network, on Radio New Zealand (Trevor Pagan), RRR Australia, BBC6 Music (Gideon Coe) and many European and US based stations, It reached the final of the Songlines World Music Awards 2010 and included on the CD to celebrate the finalists in the Best Newcomer category.

In April 2011 an album entitled Street Clan was released. Not only was this another Ethiopian fusion album as Punt, but it introduced Jamaican vocals and post-punk into the mix. It was released to international critical acclaim again scoring five and four star reviews in for example, The New York Times (Jon Pareles), fRoots Magazine (Jamie Renton), the BBC (Robin Denselow), Uncut (Nigel Williamson), World Music Network (TJ Nelson), The Daily Telegraph (Mark Hudson), The Financial Times (David Honigman), and in AllMusic (Chris Nicson). Guest musicians included Skip McDonald (On-U-Sound/African Head Charge/Little Axe/Realworld/Sugar Hill Gang/Mark Stewart and The Pop Group), Adrian Utley (Portishead), Stuart Fisher (Hole / Courtney Love), The Ozric Tentacles, Eat Static and others. It received radio airplay on BBC Radio 6 Music with Gideon Coe and was also on BBC3 Late Junction with Max Reinhardt, RRR Australia, Radio New Zealand with interviews, and national radio stations in the US and Europe including Italy, France, Spain and Germany. It reached no.25 in the World Music European Charts.

In January 2012, a download-only EP entitled The Cauldron was released with BBC Radio 6 Music airplay with Gideon Coe and European and US coverage. Reviews included a review with David Honigmann in The Financial Times.

Invisible System is the featured artist on Disc Two of The Rough Guide to the Music of Ethiopia (2012, World Music Network). This album is also available as a download only stand alone and had some reviews e.g. World Music Central; and in the Independent on Sunday alongside the rough guide. Robin Denselow who writes for The Guardian and the BBC also reviewed it.

Introducing Invisible System was also reviewed in Pop Matters alongside the subsequently released double live album Live and Raw. Live and Raw also was reviewed by David Honnigman in The Financial Times.

In 2013, Invisible System released their final Ethiopian fusion album alongside their UK and Jamaican strands. Guests included Zion Train, Baka Beyond, the members of IS who went on to perform with Dub Colossus and Juldeh Camara again better known for his work with Justin Adams as JuJu on Realworld Records; and more recently as a member of Robert Plant's band again alongside Justin Adams, The Space Shifters. It was entitled Tiga Tej Tibs and was reviewed in The Financial Times with David Honigmann in Songlines by Nige Tassell and given four stars by David Haslam in Rock N Reel / R2 Magazine. Scans of the reviews were found online.

He has a new UK-based offshoot Post Punk, Pay, Kraut style band called Invisible Eyes with Boswell who is a known Mutartis graffiti artist as well as the artist for Eat Static and Ozric Tentacles released.
