= Etran Finatawa =

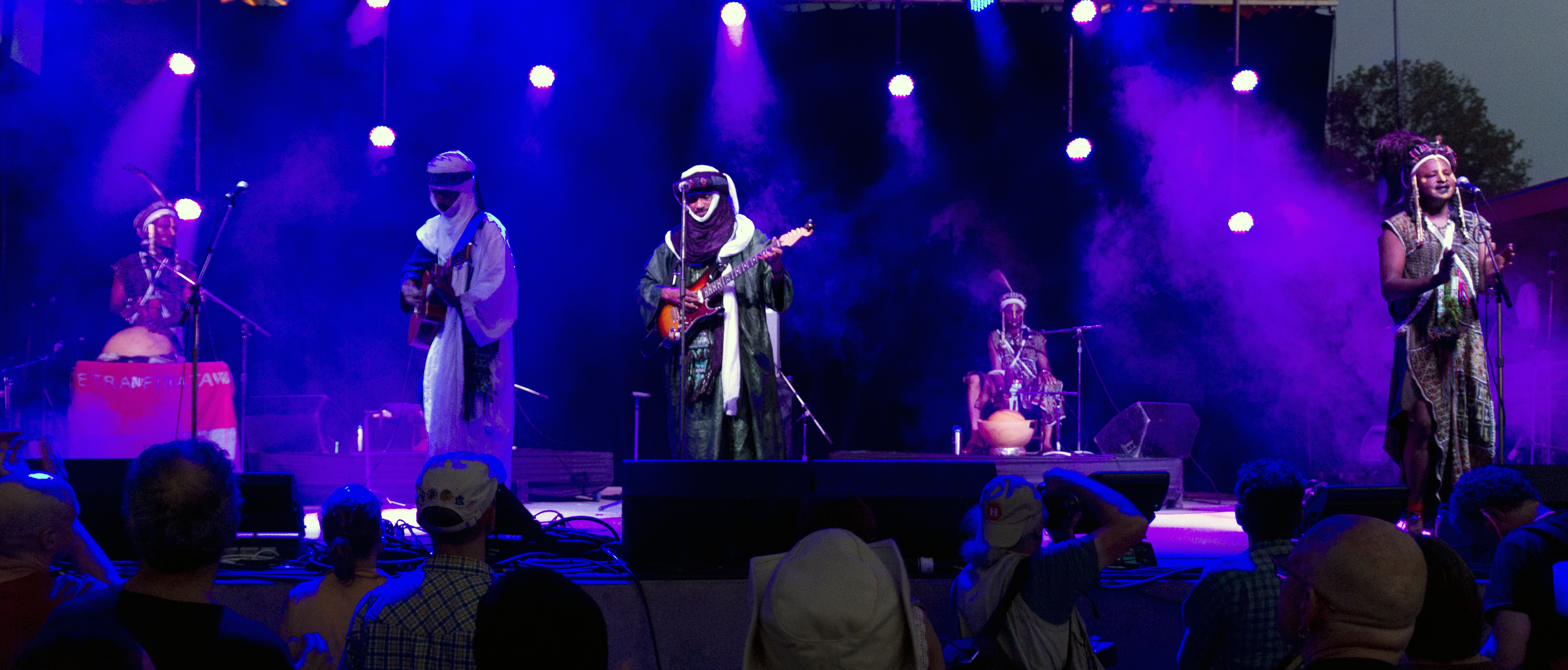
- Etran Finatawa performing at the 2011 Hillside Festival

Background information
- Origin: Niger
- Genres: Afro-beat / Blues / Roots Music / African Music
- Years active: 2004 to present
- Label: World Music Network/Riverboat Records
- Website: www.etranfinatawa.com

Etran Finatawa is a Niger-based band, formed in 2004 during the Festival au Désert near Timbuktu, Mali. The music of Etran Finatawa blends the traditional music of the Wodaabe and Tuareg people with western instruments such as the electric guitar.

Since 2005 they have toured extensively in Europe, the United States, Canada and Australia. In 2007, their debut album Introducing Etran Finatawa (2006) was nominated for a BBC Radio Award for World Music. They released their follow-up, Desert Crossroads, in 2008, and in 2010 released Tarkat Tajje/Let's Go. In 2013, the band released their fourth album, The Sahara Sessions.

The name of the band means "the stars of tradition".

== Discography ==
Studio albums

- Introducing Etran Finatawa (2006)
- Desert Crossroads (2008)
- Tarkat Tajje/Let's Go (2010)
- The Sahara Sessions (2013)

Contributing artist

- The Rough Guide to Desert Blues (2010, World Music Network)
- The Rough Guide to Acoustic Africa (2013, World Music Network)
- Etran - song by Disclosure (2020)
