= The Rough Guide to the Music of Morocco (2012 album) =

Compilation album by Various artists
- Released: 2012
- Genre: World, Moroccan
- Length: 104:52
- Label: World Music Network

Full series chronology
The Rough Guide to Fado (2012)	The Rough Guide to the Music of Morocco (2012)	The Rough Guide to African Roots Revival (2012)

The Rough Guide to the Music of Morocco is a world music compilation album originally released in 2012. Part of the World Music Network Rough Guides series, the release contains two discs: an overview of the music of Morocco—featuring such genres as Chaabi and Malhun—is found on Disc One, while Disc Two features the modern rural-urban fusion band Groupe Mazagan. The compilation was curated by Andy Morgan, former manager of Tinariwen and organizer of the Festival in the Desert. Brad Haynes and Rachel Jackson coordinated the project, and Phil Stanton, co-founder of the World Music Network, was the producer.

It is the second compilation by this name: the first edition, focusing on the same range of music with entirely different artists, was released in 2004.

== Critical reception ==
Professional ratings
Review scores
Source	Rating
Robert Christgau	A-
PopMatters	7/10 stars

The compilation's release was met with positive reviews. Robert Christgau called the record "more aggressive" than the first edition, praising the addition of Moroccan hip hop. We went on to include it in his top albums of 2012. Deanne Sole of PopMatters noted that all performers are men, almost entirely in groups. She did, though, see the appeal of the "bareness" and "forceful exposure" of the tracks.

== Track listing ==
=== Disc One ===
No.	Title	Artist	Length
1.	"Sah Raoui"	Salah Edin & Fnaire	4:19
2.	"Compagnie El Hamri/Ya Rijal L'bled"	Compagnies Musicales Du Tafilalet	8:28
3.	"El Aloua"	Amira Saqati	5:21
4.	"Iberdane"	Les Imazighen	6:50
5.	"Boolandrix"	U-Cef	5:19
6.	"Moulana (Notre Chant)"	Lemchaheb	5:23
7.	"Bania Bambara"	Gnawa Allstars & Maalem Said Damir	7:22
8.	"Jil Jdid"	H-Kayne	4:36
9.	"Mal Hbibi Malou"	Samy Elmaghribi	6:08
10.	"Ya Labess"	Groupe Mazagan	3:57
11.	"Mali Mal Hal M'Halmaz"	The Master Musicians of Joujouka	5:47

=== Disc Two ===
All tracks on Disc Two are by Groupe Mazagan, whose music has been described as "chaabi-groove".

No.	Title	Length
1.	"Abdelillah"	3:57
2.	"Ayli Ayli"	4:25
3.	"La Vignette"	4:21
4.	"Atay"	3:50
5.	"Ya Sidi Chafi [Duo]"	4:10
6.	"Allah Allah"	3:09
7.	"Sogui Belati"	4:13
8.	"Salamo Salam"	3:38
9.	"Asmae Allah"	2:17
10.	"Instrumental"	3:08
11.	"Ayli Ayli [Solo]"	4:14
