= Nuru Kane =

Senegalese singer/songwriter

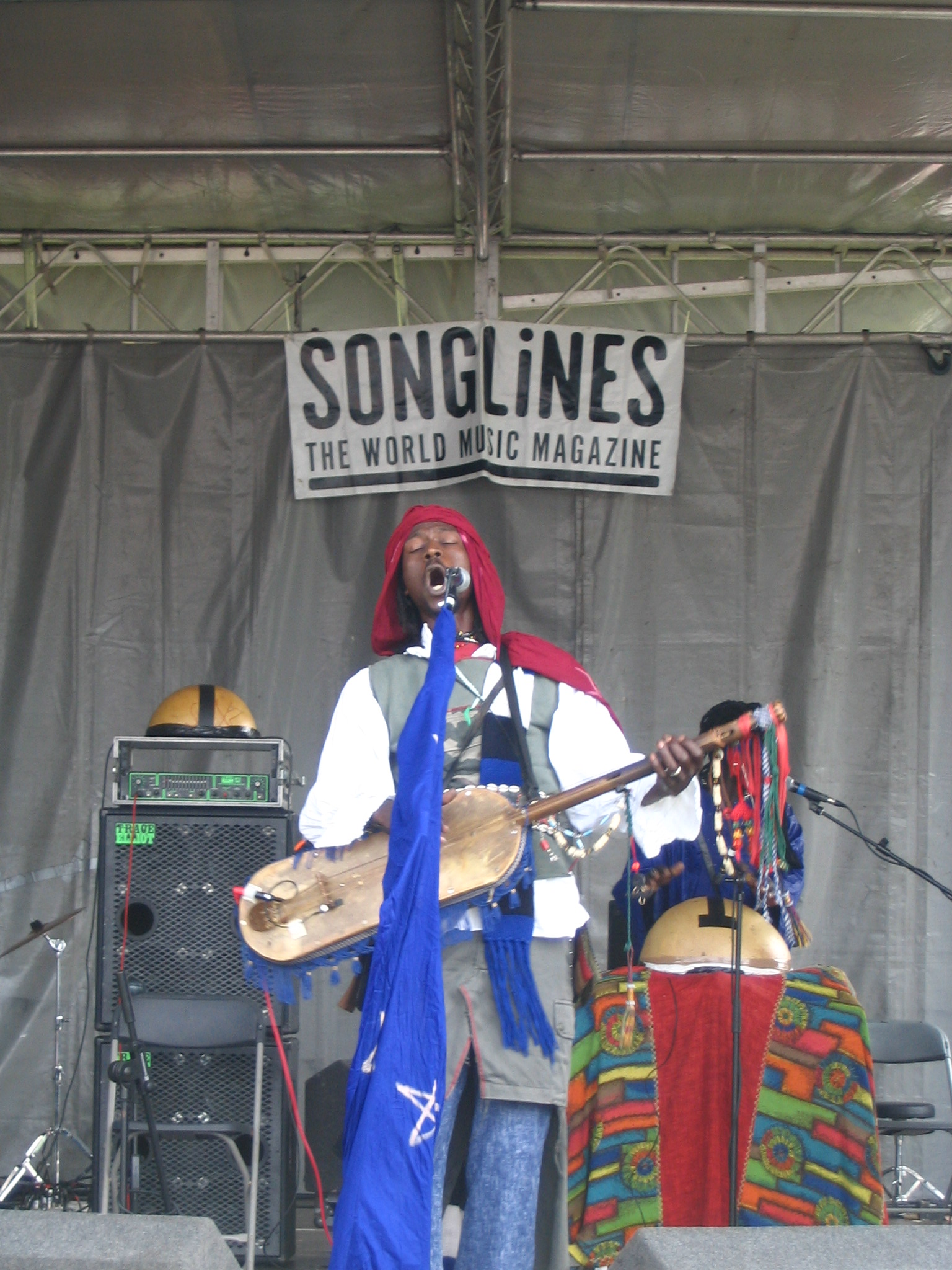
- Nuru Kane at Africa Oyé 2006

Background information
- Origin: Dakar
- Genres: African Blues; Gnawa; Griot
- Years active: 2004–present
- Labels: Riverboat Records, World Music Network

Nuru Kane (born Papa Nouroudine Kane) is a Senegalese singer/songwriter who plays guitar, bass and guimbri, a three-stringed bass in the band Bayefall Gnawa.

== Biography ==
Nuru's debut CD, Sigil, which was released in the UK on March 14, 2006 and the rest of the world on April 24 by Riverboat Records and World Music Network, included griot, gnawa, and blues influences.

In 2013, he released Exile by Riverboat Records and World Music Network.

Nuru Kane played with his band Bayefall Gnawa at the 2004 Festival in the Desert in Mali, at the 2006 Africa Oye, as well as at the Oslo World Music Festival 2010 in Norway. Two of Nuru's songs, appear on soundtracks: Goree in the film The Mechanic (2011) at the graveyard scene and Toub in the film Wonderful World.

== Discography ==
Albums

- Sigil (2006)
- Number One Bus (2010)
- Exile (2013)
- Mayam (2021)

Contributing artist

- The Rough Guide to the Music of Senegal (2013, World Music Network)
- The Rough Guide to Acoustic Africa (2013, World Music Network)
