= Scott Holstein =

American singer-songwriter

Scott Holstein (born May 5, 1974) is an American country and bluegrass singer-songwriter.

Holstein was born in Boone County, West Virginia and lives in Nashville, Tennessee. His bluegrass and country music is influenced by Ralph Stanley, Larry Sparks, and Keith Whitley. He writes his own music, and he is a baritone singer. He released his first full-length album, Cold Coal Town, in 2011. Contributing artists include Don Rigsby of the Lonesome River Band, Grammy Award winner Randy Kohrs, Clay Hess of Ricky Skaggs & Kentucky Thunder, Aaron Ramsey of Mountain Heart, Jay Weaver, Tim Crouch and Scott Vestal from the Sam Bush Band.

== Discography ==
- Cold Coal Town, Coal Records, Nashville, 2011
