= Dar Gnawa =

Dar Gnawa is a historic home and cultural site in the old city of Tangier dedicated to the musical traditions of Gnawa. It is the home of artist M’alem Abdellah El Gourd.

It became the first officially recognized center for Gnawa music in 1980.

== History ==
Artists started meeting at Dar Gnawa in the 1960s. In 1967, El Gourd met Randy Weston, whose music and scholarship promoted the now accepted idea that jazz is fundamentally African music. The two played at Dar Gnawa for years before embarking on a world tour together. Other artists who performed with El Gourd include Dexter Gordon, Odetta, and Billy Harper.

Dar Gnawa became the first officially recognized center for Gnawa music in 1980.

In 2021, the El Gourd family moved out of the house, which was in a state of disrepair and at risk of collapse, in order for necessary renovations. In 2023, Dar Gnawa reopened to receive guests after renovations were completed.

== Architecture ==
Dar Gnawa is a Moorish-style house that represents a mix of architectural styles, reflecting various international and Mediterranean influences. Behind a traditional Moroccan door, there is an interior courtyard with a stairwell of Italian marble with zellij tiles. Elsewhere, there are Italian doors and Spanish and Portuguese tiles.
