= Mamane Barka =

Nigerien musician (died 2018)

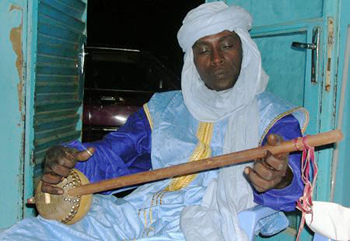
- Malam Mamane Barka playing an ngurmi African lute.

Background information
- Born: Malam Mamane Barka; 1958/1959; Tesker, Niger
- Died: 21 November 2018 (aged 59) Niamey, Niger
- Occupation: Musician
- Instruments: Biram, Ngurumi
- Label: World Music Network

Malam Mamane Barka (1958/1959 – 21 November 2018) was a Nigerien musician, and one of the world's most prominent players of the biram African harp. He died on 21 November 2018, aged 59.

== Biography ==
Malam Mamane Barka was born in 1958 or 1959 in Tesker, a town in the east of the then autonomous republic of Niger. He came from the nomadic people of Toubou. As a player of the Ngurumi, a two-string plucked instrument, he gained popularity in his homeland and neighboring Nigeria. In 2002 he decided to devote himself to the study of Biram. It is a five-stringed instrument used by the Boudouma people, a fishing community on Lake Chad, for traditional songs.
