= Samba Touré =

Malian singer and guitarist

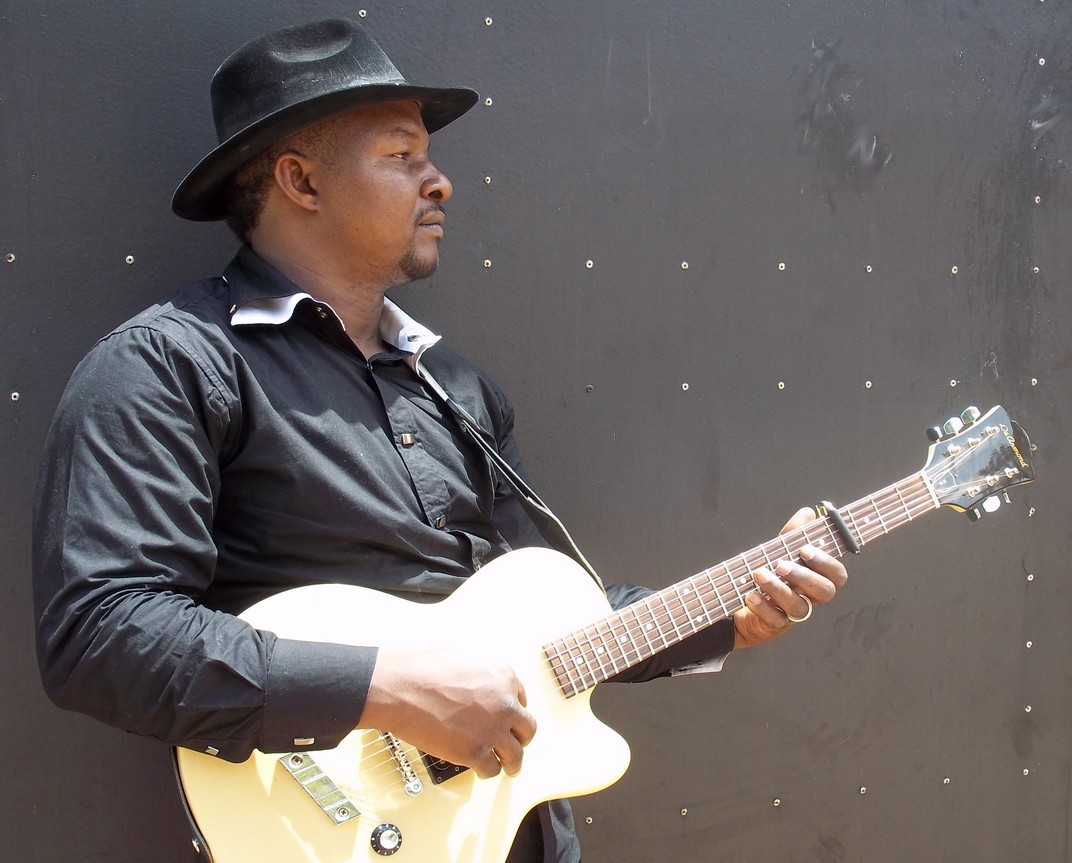

Background information
- Born: June 15, 1968 (age 57); Diré, Tomboctou Region, Mali
- Origin: Bamako, Mali
- Genres: Songhai music, desert blues
- Occupations: Singer, guitarist
- Years active: 1993-present

Samba Touré (born June 15, 1968) is a Malian singer and guitarist. He has released numerous albums, many of which have been internally renown. He has also toured across Africa, the United States and Europe several times. Touré has been repeatedly described as "anti-Griot" for the ways he breaks away from West African musical traditions.

Touré has collaborated with a large number of artists, both Malian and international. They include: Oumou Sangaré, Toumani Diabaté, Afel Bocoum, Bassekou Kouyate, Ahmed Ag Kaedy, Aziza Brahim, and Tartit. He has also toured with a number of notable musicians, including B. B. King, Ernst Reijseger, Matthieu Chedid, Vieux Farka Touré, Bonnie Raitt, Jackson Browne, Angélique Kidjo, and Songhoy Blues.

== Early life ==
Touré was born in Diré, in the Tomboctou Region. Shortly before he was born, his father died, leaving his mother to raise him and his brother, Ibrahima Séré, alone. His mother couldn't afford for Touré to attend school. As his mother was a musician, he learned music at a young age. His mother sang alongside Ali Farka Touré.

Touré once met Ali Farka Touré in a market in Niafunké when he was eight year old. Touré later credited this interaction as having created a lasting impression on him.

== Career ==
=== Early career ===
At age 25, Touré moved to Mali's capital, Bamako. Inspired by soukous from Zaire, Touré formed the band Farafina Lolo (African Star), featuring his brother playing drums and Baba Simaga playing bass guitar. Touré performed as the singer.

While playing in Farafina Lolo, Touré brought a cassette of demos to Ali Farka Touré. Ali Farka Touré was impressed, but recommended that Touré play traditional Songhai music and desert blues. Ali Farka Touré began to mentor him. Ali Farka Touré also provided Touré with equipment to play music. Due to Ali Farka Touré's training, in 1994, Touré began playing guitar, first acoustic, then later electric.

In the mid-1990s, Farafina Lolo broke up.

=== Commercial success ===
Following the breakup of Farafina Lolo, Touré joined another band, Super Lolo. He soon left the band to work as a composer.

In 1997, Ali Farka Touré hired Touré as a member of his band. In Ali Farka Touré's band, Touré toured Europe and the USA. Following his time performing with Ali Farka Touré, Touré returned to Mali and released his first album, titled Fondo. Fondo which saw commercial success in Mali, including the single Anbafo.

In 2005, Touré played on the album Taama, by Amadou Guitteye. He composed two tracks and played alongside Toumani Diabaté, Vieux Farka Touré, and Baba Sissoko.

In 2007, Touré released a new album, Aïto, and toured across West Africa with his backing band, called Fondo, to promote it.

In 2008, Touré signed to the label World Music Network. The following year, he released the album Songhaï Blues: Homage to Ali Farka Touré, which was a compilation of songs from his first two albums. This was his first album released outside of Mali. Due to the influence that Ali Farka Touré had on Touré, he was seen as Ali Farka Touré's successor. In 2010, Touré joined Toumani Diabaté on his Ali Farka Touré Variations Tour.

In 2011, Touré released the album Crocodile Blues on Riverboat Records, which won the Tamani d’Or Malian Award for best international album. Hugo Race featured on the album. In 2012, Touré toured Europe.

In 2013, Touré released the album Albala on the label Glitterbeat Records. In 2015, he released the album Gandadiko. Gandadiko was inspired by the Mali War. Gandadiko reached #2 on the World Music Charts Europe. The album was followed by a European tour in 2015 and 2016.

Touré released several more albums on Glitterbeat Records. In 2018, he released the album Wande. In 2021, he released the album Binga. Binga won the award for Best Artist of the Year at the 2021 Songlines Music Awards. In 2024, he released the album Baarakelaw. Baarakelaw was recorded during an energy crisis in 2023, which made recording difficult as power outages were frequent and unpredictable.

== Personal life ==
Touré's wife passed away during his 2023 European tour.

== Discography ==
- 2003 - Fondo (Camara Production)
- 2007 - Aïto (Seydoni Mali)
- 2009 - Songhaï Blues: Homage to Ali Farka Touré (Riverboat Records)
- 2011 - Crocodile Blues (Riverboat Records)
- 2013 - Albala (Glitterbeat Records)
- 2018 - Wande (Glitterbeat Records)
- 2021 - Binga (Glitterbeat Records)
- 2024 - Baarakelaw (Glitterbeat Records)
