= World Music Network =

- Founder: Phil Stanton, Sandra Alayón-Stanton
- Genre: World Music
- Country of origin: United Kingdom
- Location: London
- Official website: www.worldmusic.net

World Music Network is a UK-based record label specializing in world music.

The World Music Network website features news, reviews, live music listings, and guide sections on world music. It also features an online "Battle of the Bands" competition.

== History ==
Founded in 1994 by husband-and-wife team Phil Stanton and Colombian-born Sandra Alayón-Stanton, World Music Network consists of four record labels – Music Rough Guides, Riverboat Records, Introducing and Think Global.

Accolades include a 2009 Grammy Award nomination for Debashish Bhattacharya – who was also awarded the BBC Best Asian Artist award in 2008 – a WMCE Top Label award and more Songlines (magazine) 'Top of the World’ releases than any other independent world music label.

World Music Network, along with Riverboat Records, was presented with the WOMEX Label Award in 2013.

WMN is announced winner of the WOMEX 2013 Label Award.

Following on from the death of founder Phil Stanton in 2019, World Music Network has been managed by Neil Record, John Ditchfield and Phil's daughter India Stanton.

== Labels ==
=== Music Rough Guides ===
Music Rough Guides has been releasing the Rough Guide music series in association with the Rough Guides travel book publishers since 1994, when the first world music book and album in that series were released.

Since then, Music Rough Guides have covered destinations as diverse as Afghanistan, Ethiopia, Japan, and Hungary. They have also covered musical styles such as merengue music, klezmer, salsa and Bollywood.

=== Riverboat Records ===
Since 1989 Riverboat Records have produced artists from around the world. Releases in recent years include those by the artists; Debashish Bhattacharya, Mory Kante, Nuru Kane, Ramzi Aburedwan, SambaSunda, Kristi Stassinopoulou & Stathis Kalyviotis and 'Gaelic Americana' artist Kyle Carey.

=== Introducing ===
A separate artist label to Riverboat Records, Introducing was launched by World Music Network in 2004, out of a desire to promote exposure for previously undiscovered musical talent from around the world. Introducing showcases artists previously unreleased or unavailable outside of their own country.

The Introducing label has had a number of releases including features for Ethiopian reggae-fusion project Invisible System, and Saharan blues band Etran Finatawa.

Other projects include albums from Miami Latin hip-hop collective Spam Allstars, South African maskanda player Shiyani Ngcobo, Chinese folk band Hanggai and a release by the desert blues master Mamane Barka.

=== Think Global ===
World Music Network has released a number of fundraising albums released in association with Amnesty International and Oxfam.

The Think Global series aims to promote music that reduces poverty, defends human rights and encourages protecting the environment. Releases include Think Global: Women Of Africa and Think Global: Tango.

== Battle of the Bands ==
In the Battle of the Bands section of World Music Network's website, musicians are invited to post their best original track and build their page with photos and text. Members of the public and World Music Network staff then review and vote for the winner. Each winner gets to have their material featured on future projects and a link to the winning track also gets sent to all the tens of thousands of people on World Music Network's mailing lists. Winners have included Giuliano Modarelli and Julaba Kunda (featuring Gambian griot Juldeh Camara).
