= T'heydinn =

Moorish epic of Mauritania

- Medium: Poetry and music
- Originating culture: Mauritanian
- Originating era: 17th century–present

Moorish epic T'heydinn
- UNESCO Intangible Cultural Heritage
- Country: Mauritania
- Reference: 00524
- Region: Arab States

Inscription history
- Inscription: 2011 (6th session)
- List: Need of Urgent Safeguarding

T'heydinn or T'heydinne (Arabic: التهيدين, romanized: al-T'haydīn, variously also called Al Batt Likbir and Al Rasm) is a Moorish epic ensemble of Mauritania. It is an important literary and artistic manifestation of the Hassaniya language and was, in 2011, added to the UNESCO's Intangible Cultural Heritage List.

== Origins ==
The T’heydinn dates back to the 17th century and contains dozens of poems that praise the exploits of Moorish emirs and sultans and narrates events and traditions that trace the social, cultural and historical evolution of the Moors. The T'heydinn talk of the intermingling of the two main elements of Moorish society today, the Beni Hassan, the descendants of the Beni Hilal who migrated from the Arabian Peninsula, and the Sanhaja, the ancient Berber inhabitants of the Maghreb. It is performed by griots (or iggawen in Hassaniya) who are singers who have acquired their art by directly imitating the musical talents of their ancestors.

== Griots ==
The T'heydinn is an oral history of each Moorish tribe which is recited and handed down the generations by the tribe's griots through music and poetry. In traditional Moorish society, each tribe maintained its griots on a gabdh, a kind of lifelong annual pension. Changes in lifestyle have meant this no longer the case and the T'heydin is today an endangered oral culture. Most of the griots today are elderly, with rapidly diminishing numbers and very few youngsters show an interest in taking up the griots lifestyle. The T'heydin is an oral tradition that is handed down the generations through the imitation of the musical talents of the ancestors and is performed on festive occasions with musical accompaniment. The griots live in all regions of Mauritania, although some regions are better known for their griot families. The regions of Hodh, Tagant-Assaba, Trarza-Brakna and Adrar are particularly well known for its griots. The population of griots is currently estimated to stand at over a thousand.

The griots belong to specific families and almost form a musical caste within Mauritanian society. T’heydinn poems have also been composed by poets not belonging to such families. Griots hand down their knowledge from father to son. The father or a qualified relative initiates the young griot into playing musical instruments and later into the arts of music and poetry, culminating in his initiation into the art of the T’heydinn through recitation and mastery of the family’s own heritage. During this period of apprenticeship, the apprentice performer accompanies his father at all events, ceremonies and performances where he can turn practice and acquire new skills on the job. Every griot family guards its own T’heydinn repertoire as it distinguishes it from other griot families. A griot in possession of the whole epic is respected by all the other griot families and termed a 'bearer of the T’heydinn epic'.

== Music ==
The T’heydinn is performed at social events such as weddings, reconciliation ceremonies and invitations. The recitation of the epic and its accompanying music provides for elaborate and sophisticated entertainment. The main musical instruments accompanying the recitation are the tidinet, a six-stringed lute and the ardin, a thirteen-stringed harp which are played to rouse the audience. Other musical elements employed include the tbal, a kettledrum, ululations, hand-clapping and lip vibrations (tberbir).

== Role in society ==
The T’heydinn acts to strengthen social ties between griots and their communities and between the various communities themselves. It extols values such as honour, courage, generosity, honesty, endurance, magnanimity, rectitude and justice. It provides an opportunity for regional tribal and family reunions and promotes a culture of social peace and mutual assistance among communities based on the values it preaches.

== A dying tradition ==
Today, most griots are old and they seldom perform even as their numbers are falling. Also these recitations no longer produce an adequate income and many young griots no longer take up the T’heydinn as a career. In recent years some griot organizations have been formed with the aim of imparting the T'heydinn to the younger generation and the Mauritanian Institute of Music has taken up the task of disseminating the art. Purists also point to how the original musical form of the T'heydinn, the faghu, is increasingly being replaced by lighter musical forms such as the liyyinn, destroying its original musical basis. Being solely an oral tradition, there are no manuals or catalogues of the T'heydinn which puts it at a greater risk of extinction.

== See also ==
- Al-Sirah Al-Hilaliyyah
- Arabic epic literature
- Music of Mauritania
