= Lojo =

Lojo may refer to:

- Lohja (Finnish; Swedish: Lojo), a town in Finland
- Lo'Jo, a French band
