= Amadjar =

Studio album by Tinariwen
- Released: 6 September 2019
- Recorded: Western Sahara; Nouakchott, Mauritania
- Genre: African blues, world
- Length: 54:13
- Label: Anti/Epitaph

Tinariwen chronology
Elwan (2017)	Amadjar (2019)	Amatssou (2023)

Professional ratings
Review scores
Source	Rating
AllMusic	4/5 stars
The Guardian	4/5 stars

Amadjar is the eighth album by the Tuareg band Tinariwen, released on September 6, 2019. The album's title means "the foreign traveler" in the Tamashek language. The album features guest appearances by Noura Mint Seymali, Micah Nelson, Cass McCombs, Stephen O'Malley, Warren Ellis, and Rodolphe Burger. The album reached number 74 on the Ultratop albums chart in Belgium.

== Background ==
In 2018, Tinariwen finished an international tour in support of their previous album, Elwan. They were unable to return to their home area in northern Mali due to sectarian violence and threats from Islamist militants. The group instead decamped in Morocco and embarked on a multi-month journey through Western Sahara and Mauritania, collaborating with local musicians at several stops along the way and writing songs while camped out in the desert. Upon arriving in Nouakchott they were hosted by Mauritanian singer/griot Noura Mint Seymali and her husband Jeiche Ould Chighaly. The album was recorded outdoors in the Nouakchott area with mobile equipment, with additional overdubs recorded at studios in France and Morocco. The Guardian noted that the album's unusual genesis "places the listener entirely within the nomadic Tinariwen universe." The album's lyrics reflect the group's recent struggles in trying to return to their homeland, their journey through Western Sahara and Mauritania, and their experiences as an unlikely international touring act.

== Reception ==
The album received positive reviews from critics. AllMusic praised the album as "a testament to their unyielding collaborative spirit, and on this hybrid of an album, they again summon a common musical language while sounding as authentic as ever." In the words of PopMatters, "No one puts the soul of the Sahara into music so intimately and ingeniously as Tinariwen, and Amadjar is a particularly well-polished jewel." The A.V. Club said that the album is possibly the best of Tinariwen's career, as "droning songs of interlocking (and mostly acoustic) guitar come together with an appealing slowness, as if each element is steadily wandering in from the wilderness, curious about the noise and ready to join in." The Times of London described the album as having "a sound that feels ancient, empty and slightly scary." Riff Magazine praised the album as "the closest anyone will get to the true essence of what Tinariwen represent as a cultural and musical force." Glide Magazine said "Amadjar brims with a true roots essence" and "speaks of unity and togetherness, an understanding that the future needs to be fought together in community and harmony."

== Track listing ==
No.	Title	Writer(s)	Length
1.	"Tenere Maloulat"	Ibrahim Ag Alhabib	3:43
2.	"Zawal"	Abdallah Ag Alhousseyni	4:04
3.	"Amalouna"	Ibrahim Ag Alhabib / Noura Mint Seymali	4:01
4.	"Taqkal Tarha"	Ibrahim Ag Alhabib	3:59
5.	"Anina"	Abdallah Ag Alhousseyni	3:43
6.	"Madjam Mahilkamen"	Alhassane Ag Touhami	3:47
7.	"Takount"	Abdallah Ag Alhousseyni	3:11
8.	"Iklam Dglour"	Ibrahim Ag Alhabib	4:35
9.	"Kel Tinawen"	Ibrahim Ag Alhabib	3:57
10.	"Itous Ohar"	Ibrahim Ag Alhabib	4:19
11.	"Mhadjar Yassouf Idjan"	Ibrahim Ag Alhabib	4:22
12.	"Wartilla"	Abdallah Ag Alhousseyni	5:36
13.	"Lalla"	Abdallah Ag Alhousseyni	4:56
Total length:			54:13

== Personnel ==
All information from album liner notes.

- Ibrahim Ag Alhabib – lead vocals and lead guitar (tracks 1, 3, 4, 8, 9, 10, 11)
- Abdallah Ag Alhousseyni – lead vocals and lead guitar (tracks 2, 5, 7, 12, 13), backing vocals (all tracks)
- Alhassane Ag Touhami – lead vocals and lead guitar (track 6), backing vocals (all tracks)
- Eyadou Ag Leche – bass (all tracks), guitar (tracks 4, 9), backing vocals (all tracks)
- Elaga Ag Hamid – guitar (all tracks), backing vocals (all tracks)
- Said Ag Ayad – percussion (all tracks), backing vocals (all tracks), guitar (tracks 6, 9)
- Noura Mint Seymali – lead vocals (track 3), ardin (tracks 2, 3, 7), backing vocals (track 7)
- Amar Chaoui – percussion (all tracks)
- Lala, Aicha – backing vocals (tracks 1, 4, 5, 6, 9, 10, 11)
- Rodolph Burger – guitar (track 8)
- Warren Ellis – violin loops (tracks 1, 2, 8, 11, 12)
- Cass McCombs – guitar (tracks 9, 10), backing vocals (track 9)
- Micah Nelson – charango, mandolin (track 4)
- Stephen O'Malley – guitar (tracks 3, 10, 12)
- Jeiche Ould Chighaly – guitar (track 2)

== Charts ==
Chart (2019)	Peak position
Belgian Albums (Ultratop Flanders)	74
