= Imidiwan: Companions =

Studio album by Tinariwen
- Released: 29 June 2009
- Genre: Desert blues; folk; world
- Label: Independiente

Tinariwen chronology
Aman Iman (2007)	Imidiwan: Companions (2009)	Tassili (2011)

Professional ratings
Aggregate scores
Source	Rating
Metacritic	84/100
Review scores
Source	Rating
AllMusic	3.5/5 stars
Clash	8/10
Cokemachineglow	79%
Entertainment Weekly	A
The Guardian	4/5 stars
musicOMH	4.5/5 stars
Pitchfork	7.6/10
PopMatters	8/10
Rolling Stone	3.5/5 stars
Spin	4/5 stars

Imidiwan: Companions, released 29 June 2009, is the fourth studio album by Tuareg band Tinariwen. The album saw the band reunite with Jean-Paul Romann, the producer of their 2001 album The Radio Tisdas Sessions. Some editions of the album include a DVD featuring a 30-minute documentary about the band.

== Themes ==
Joe Tangari of Pitchfork discussed how the band experienced much of the world outside the desert and how it has influenced the new direction of this album. He said "lyrically the songs, sung in Tamashek, visit themes of liberation and cultural-historical pride". Later he stated that it contains assuf "an untranslatable word with implications of homesickness, loneliness, and sadness; it also refers to the nighttime world beyond the light of the campfire."

== Critical reception ==
The album received generally positive reviews. The Guardian gave the album 4 out of 5 stars, saying "Tinariwen just keep on keepin' on, relentless and brilliant as the Saharan sun." The Daily Telegraph also gave the album 4 stars, saying that the band are "...the nearest thing the modern world provides to a real blues feel."

Imidiwan also won the 2009 Uncut Music Award for being "the most inspiring and richly rewarding album of the last 12 months".

== Track listing ==
No.	Title	Writer(s)	Length
1.	"Imidiwan Afrik Tendam"	Ibrahim Ag Alhabib	3:32
2.	"Lulla"	Ibrahim Ag Alhabib	3:49
3.	"Tenhert"	Abdallah Ag Alhousseyni	5:28
4.	"Enseqi Ehad Didagh"	Ibrahim Ag Alhabib	5:40
5.	"Tahult In"	Alhassane Ag Touhami	4:10
6.	"Tamudjeras Assis"	Mohammed Ag Itlale ("Japonais")	4:51
7.	"Intitlayaghen"	Abdallah Ag Alhousseyni	4:49
8.	"Imazaghen N Adagh"	Abdallah Ag Lamida ("Intidao")	3:46
9.	"Tenalle Chegret"	Ibrahim Ag Alhabib	5:43
10.	"Kel Tamashek"	Abdallah Ag Alhousseyni	3:16
11.	"Assuf Ag Assuf"	Ibrahim Ag Alhabib	4:54
12.	"Chabiba"	Ibrahim Ag Alhabib	3:21
13.	"Ere Tasfata Adounia"	Alhassane Ag Touhami	4:53
14.	"Desert Wind"	Ibrahim Ag Alhabib	4:19

Note: "Desert Wind," an instrumental, was included as a bonus track in some editions of the album.

== Personnel ==
All information from album liner notes.

- Ibrahim Ag Alhabib – lead vocals and lead guitar (tracks 1, 2, 4, 9, 11, 12), backing vocals (track 10), other instruments (track 14)
- Abdallah Ag Alhousseyni – lead vocals and lead guitar (tracks 3, 7, 10)
- Alhassane Ag Touhami – lead vocals and lead guitar (tracks 5, 13), backing vocals (tracks 1, 2, 4, 9, 10, 12)
- Mohammed Ag Itlale ("Japonais") – lead vocals and lead guitar (track 6), backing vocals (tracks 1, 2, 4)
- Abdallah Ag Lamida ("Intidao") – lead vocals and lead guitar (track 8), guitar (tracks 1, 3, 12), backing vocals (tracks 4, 5, 6, 9, 10, 12, 13)
- Eyadou Ag Leche – bass (all tracks except 10, 11, 14), guitar (tracks 3, 5, 6, 8, 13), backing vocals (tracks 5, 6, 8, 9, 13), percussion (tracks 3, 6, 7, 8, 13)
- Elaga Ag Hamid – guitar (all tracks except 7, 10, 14), backing vocals (tracks 1, 13), percussion (track 5)
- Said Ag Ayad – percussion (tracks 1, 2, 4, 5, 8, 9, 12, 13)
- Liya Ag Ablil ("Diara") – guitar (tracks 1, 2, 3, 4, 7, 9, 12, 13)
- Sanou Ag Ahmed – percussion (tracks 1, 2, 4, 9, 12), guitar (tracks 8, 12), backing vocals (tracks 1, 2, 4, 6, 8)
- Fatma – percussion (track 1), backing vocals (tracks 2, 3, 4, 5, 7, 9, 12, 13)
- Mohammed – percussion (tracks 1, 2, 3, 4, 5, 8, 11, 12, 13), backing vocals (track 12)
- Matthieu Rousseau – percussion (all tracks except 8, 10, 14)
- Tende of Tessalit – percussion (track 10)
- Wounou Walet Sidati – backing vocals (tracks 2, 3, 4, 5, 7, 9, 12, 13)
- Dayasso – backing vocals (tracks 2, 4, 12)
- Aroun – backing vocals (tracks 1, 9)
- Baka – backing vocals (track 2)
- Moustapha – backing vocals (track 2)
- Abdallah – backing vocals (track 2)
- Ousman, Al Hassan, Fatimata – children's vocals (track 1)
