= Unwired: Africa =

Compilation album by Various artists
- Released: 26 September 2000
- Genre: World, acoustic, African
- Length: 72:22
- Label: World Music Network

Full series chronology
| Oxfam Salsa (2000) | Unwired: Africa (2000) | The Rough Guide to the Music of Marrabenta Mozambique (2001) |

Unwired: Africa is a world music benefit compilation album originally released in 2000, with proceeds going to Amnesty International. Part of the World Music Network Rough Guides series, the release features African acoustic music, from traditional to pop. The compilation was produced and compiled by Phil Stanton, co-founder of the World Music Network. Catherine Steinmann wrote the liner notes.

Countries represented in this compilation include Mozambique, Zimbabwe, the DRC, Cape Verde, Sudan, Mali, Guinea, Mauritania, Egypt, Madagascar, and South Africa.

== Critical reception ==
Professional ratings
Review scores
| Source | Rating |
|---|---|
| Allmusic | 4.5/5 stars |

Writing for AllMusic, Bret Love called the album "consistently excellent" and "a beautiful compilation for those interested in the lighter side of African music".

== Track listing ==
| No. | Title | Artist (Country) | Length |
|---|---|---|---|
| 1. | "Masikini" | Eyuphuro (Mozambique) | 5:11 |
| 2. | "Kayini Wura" | Oumou Sangare (Mali) | 5:59 |
| 3. | "Sikulu" | Mose Se Sengo (Democratic Republic of the Congo) | 7:08 |
| 4. | "Valsa Azul" | Simentera (Cape Verde) | 3:37 |
| 5. | "Komssou" | Setona (Sudan) | 4:13 |
| 6. | "Yamfa" | Toumani Diabaté & Ballaké Sissoko (Mali) | 5:10 |
| 7. | "Jaman Moro" | Afel Bocoum (Mali) | 4:15 |
| 8. | "Midje" | Momo Wandel Soumah (Guinea) | 5:07 |
| 9. | "Hassaniya Song for Dancing" | Khalifa Ould Eide & Dimi Mint Abba (Mauritania) | 5:22 |
| 10. | "Elleya Misafir" | Salamat (Egypt) | 6:46 |
| 11. | "Retany" | Tarika (Madagascar) | 3:44 |
| 12. | "Mwana Wamambo" | Oliver Mtukudzi (Zimbabwe) | 5:35 |
| 13. | "Mukanga Poto" | Spirit Talk Mbira (Zimbabwe) | 5:57 |
| 14. | "Eleventh Hour" | Abdullah Ibrahim (South Africa) | 4:18 |
