= Hoggar =

Studio album by Tinariwen
- Released: 13 March 2026
- Genres: African blues; world
- Length: 45:00
- Label: Wedge Records
- Producer: Patrick Votan

Tinariwen chronology
Amatssou (2023)	Hoggar (2026)

Hoggar is the tenth album by the Tuareg band Tinariwen, released on 13 March 2026. The album features guest contributions from Swedish singer/guitarist José González and Sudanese singer and oud player Sulafa Elyas. The first single from the album was "Sagherat Assani", an adaptation of a traditional Sudanese song featuring Elyas. The album was accompanied by an international tour, but with no dates in North America due to travel bans directed at the home nations of several Tinariwen members.

== Background ==
After touring internationally in support of their previous album Amatssou, members of Tinariwen were forced to flee their home base in northern Mali and relocate to Algeria, due to Russian-backed mercenaries with the Wagner Group participating in the area's long-running conflicts. Members of Tinariwen are among many residents of the region that have been displaced by the recent conflicts, and many of the album's lyrics discuss these events. The album was recorded in Tamanrasset, Algeria, a former home of founding member Ibrahim Ag Alhabib. The album is titled after the Hoggar Mountains of southern Algeria, a symbolic refuge for the Tuareg people.

The album was produced by Patrick Votan, who structured the album as a showcase of the multiple generations of musicians and singers who have participated in Tinariwen recordings since the collective was founded in the late 1970s. Founding members Ibrahim Ag Alhabib, Abdallah Ag Alhousseyni, and Alhassane Ag Touhami sing on each other's songs after not having done so for the past several albums, while early member Liya Ag Ablil participated for the first time in more than two decades. The song "Sagherat Assani" is a tribute to former member Mohammed "Japonais" Ag Itlale, who died in 2021. Former member Iyad Moussa Ben Abderahmane, now leader of the Algerian rock group Imarhan, makes his first appearance with Tinariwen in several years. Younger members of the collective were given enhanced roles to "pass the torch onto a younger generation".

Longtime admirer José González added Spanish vocals to the track "Imidiwan Takyadam". While women have provided backing vocals for Tinariwen periodically over the group's career, Hoggar adds prominence to women's vocals to highlight the recent difficulties faced by Tuareg women in music.

== Critical reception ==
Professional ratings
Aggregate scores
Source	Rating
Metacritic	89/100
Review scores
Source	Rating
Far Out	4.5/5 stars
Louder Than War	4/5 stars
PopMatters	9/10
Uncut	4.5/5 stars

According to the review aggregator Metacritic, Hoggar received "universal acclaim" based on a weighted average score of 89 out of 100 from 5 critic scores.

Music Custodian described the album as "cultural testimony" on the ongoing conflicts in the group's homeland, and as "a marker of continuity" connecting the past and future visions of the collective. According to The Blues Magazine, "the album stands as a symbol of homeland and endurance—much like Tinariwen themselves." In the words of Glide Magazine, "Hoggar is a gift. It represents an opportunity to hear something unfamiliar, something old, whose very language is a different kind of sound. If you are unfamiliar with the band’s music, this release may be the perfect place to start."

In the words of Spectrum Culture, Hoggar "feels like a fresh start for Tinariwen as well as a deepening and a refinement of what has made the Bedouin [sic] supergroup such an international sensation." Louder Than War noted that the album "surprises with renewed warmth, intimacy and a fierce political edge." Far Out described the album as one of Tinariwen's best, and concluded "You sense them all sitting around a campfire, passionately calling for change in these touching songs of unrest, wearied by how often they have been called to carry the torch for peace, but emboldened by the wisdom of age and the will of the ways of the world."

== Track listing ==
No.	Title	Writer(s)	Length
1.	"Amidinim Ehaf Solan"	Alhassane Ag Touhami	3:22
2.	"Imidiwan Takyadam"	Ibrahim Ag Alhabib, José González	4:16
3.	"Erghad Afewo"	Ibrahim Ag Alhabib	3:34
4.	"Tad Adounya"	Eyadou Ag Leche, Iyad Moussa Ben Abderrahmane	6:36
5.	"Asstaghfero Allah"	Ibrahim Ag Alhabib	3:23
6.	"Sagherat Assani"	Abdallah Ag Alhousseyni, Sulafa Elyas	3:28
7.	"N’ak Tenere Iyat"	Abdallah Ag Alhousseyni	4:14
8.	"Amidinin Wadar Nohar"	Ibrahim Ag Alhabib	3:12
9.	"Khay Erilan"	Alhassane Ag Touhami	4:50
10.	"Dounia Tau Ray"	Ibrahim Ag Alhabib	4:00
11.	"Aba Malik"	Abdallah Ag Alhousseyni	4:05
Total length:			45:00

== Personnel ==
- Ibrahim Ag Alhabib – lead vocals and lead guitar (tracks 2, 3, 5, 8, 10), backing vocals (all tracks)
- Abdallah Ag Alhousseyni – lead vocals and lead guitar (tracks 6, 7, 11), backing vocals (all tracks)
- Alhassane Ag Touhami – lead vocals and lead guitar (track 1, 9), backing vocals (all tracks)
- Eyadou Ag Leche – bass, backing vocals (all tracks)
- Elaga Ag Hamid – guitar, backing vocals (all tracks)
- Sanou Ag Ahmed – guitar, backing vocals (all tracks)
- Said Ag Ayad – percussion, backing vocals (all tracks)
- Haiballah Akhamouk – percussion, backing vocals (all tracks)
- Anana Harouna, Nounou Kaola, Wonou Walet Sidati, Hardou, Djelle – backing vocals, claps (all tracks)
- Liya Ag Ablil – guitar (track 1, 2, 5, 6, 8, 10)
- José González – vocals, guitar (track 2)
- Emile Papandreou – e-bow (track 3)
- Iyad Moussa Ben Abderahmane – lead vocals, lead guitar (track 4)
- Abdelkader Ourzig – guitar (tracks 4, 6)
- Sulafa Elyas – vocals, oud (track 6)
- Hicham Bouhasse – guitar (track 9)
