= Momo Wandel Soumah =

Guinean musician

- Born: 1926
- Origin: Labé, Guinea
- Died: June 15, 2003 (aged 76–77) Dixinn, Conakry, Guinea
- Genres: Jazz, African traditional
- Occupations: Musician, singer, composer, musical director
- Instruments: Tenor saxophone, Alto saxophone, Clarinet, Banjo, Mandolin
- Years active: 1951–2003
- Labels: Buda Musique, Fonti Musicali

Momo Wandel Soumah (1926 – June 15, 2003) was a singer, composer, and saxophonist from Guinea, recognisable by his characteristic gravelly voice.

Soumah started out in the 1950s playing in dance bands, but moved to modern Guinean music following the cultural revolution. He was a part of the greatly influential Syli Orchestra (originally Syli Orchestre National) who were formed under the instruction of the first elected president Sekou Toure. The group of Guinea's elite musicians were selected to travel throughout Guinea and inspire and instruct musicians across the country and help set up the regional orchestras that were key to Sekou Toure's 'Authenticité' programme to promote and proliferate 'authentic' Guinean traditional music after colonial rule. From the mid 1980s Soumah developed an idiosyncratic blend of jazz and African traditional music.

He died suddenly on June 15, 2003. At the time of his death Soumah was musical director of Circus Baobab.

== Discography ==
- Matchowé (1992)
- Afro Swing (2001)
- Momo Le Doyen (soundtrack, 2007)

Contributing artist

- Unwired: Africa (2000, World Music Network)
- Desert Blues 2 (2002, Network)

== See also ==
- Momo le doyen a film by Laurent Chevalier, 2006
