= Tassili (album) =

Studio album by Tinariwen
- Released: 29 August 2011
- Recorded: 1–20 November 2010, Tassili n'Ajjer, south-east Algeria
- Genres: African blues; world
- Label: Anti-
- Producers: Ian Brennan, Jean Paul Romann

Tinariwen chronology
Imidiwan: Companions (2009)	Tassili (2011)	Emmaar (2014)

Tassili is the fifth album by the Tuareg-Berber band Tinariwen, recorded in Tassili n'Ajjer, an Algerian national park in 2011. The album marked a major departure from previous recordings. The producer, Ian Brennan, stated that it "was the least overdubbed, most live, band-centric and song-oriented record they have done.”

The album won a Grammy Award for Best World Music Album in 2012.

== Recording sessions ==
The album was recorded during a three-week session in the rocky desert near Djanet, a town on the southern rim of the Tassili n'Ajjer plateau, in southeastern Algeria. It was this protected region from which the group derived the album's name. The plateau served as an alternate location to record the album after Tessalit, the band's home town in northern Mali, proved to be too precarious due to renewed conflict.

The region's close proximity to Libya made it a place of relative safe passage for Kel Tamashek fighters who traveled from the refugee camps in Libya to the battlefront of northern Mali during the 1980s and the Tuareg Rebellion during the early 1990s. It was during this time that the group's founding members first came to play together as political exiles in tents and around campfires of refugee settlements.

The rehearsals for and recording of the album were conducted in similar way to those original performances.

"We wanted to go back to our origins, to the experience of [being exiled]... Those were times when we would sit around a campfire, singing songs and passing around a guitar. Tinariwen was born in that movement, in that atmosphere, so what you hear on ‘Tassili’ is the feeling of ishumar."

— Eyadou ag Leche, The New York Times

Tinariwen, in addition to largely substituting both acoustic guitars and unamplified percussion for their usual electric guitars (reflecting their return to an older way of life), also transported hundreds of pounds of recording equipment and other gear to a canyon deep in the desert (running off a generator placed far enough from the microphones in the main tent to prevent noise pollution).

Gregory Davis and Roger Lewis of the Dirty Dozen Brass Band, with arrangement by Ian Brennan, contributed to the fourth track "Ya Messinagh". Kyp Malone and Tunde Adebimpe from the American art rock band, TV on the Radio, traveled to the isolated recording site, staying eight days and contributing backing vocal harmonies on five tracks and lead vocals on one track. They had first met Tinariwen two years before at the Coachella festival in California when the two bands were on the same bill. Nels Cline, the guitarist from the American alternative rock band Wilco, played on the first track, "Imidiwan Ma Tenam".

The album was mixed by David Odlum at Studio Soyuz in Paris during February 2011 and at Studio Black Box in Angers during March 2011. It was mastered by John Golden at the Golden Mastering recording studio in Ventura, California during April 2011.

== Reception ==
Professional ratings
Aggregate scores
Source	Rating
Metacritic	(80/100)
Review scores
Source	Rating
Antiquiet	(5/5)
Pitchfork	(7.8/10)
The Guardian	4/5 stars
The Observer	4/5 stars
Rolling Stone	3.5/5 stars
Paste	(8.2/10)
AllMusic	4/5 stars
Spin	8/10 stars
PopMatters	9/10 stars

Bob Boilen stated in a review of the album for NPR Music that "Tinariwen is just about the best guitar-based rock band of the 21st century."

Elysa Gardner of USA Today gave the album 2.5 stars out of 4. At Metacritic, which assigns a normalised rating out of 100 to reviews from mainstream critics, the album received a score of 80, based on 37 reviews, indicating "generally favorable reviews". Uncut placed the album at number 18 on its list of the top 50 albums of 2011.

Mojo placed the album at number 35 on its list of "Top 50 albums of 2011."

On 12 February 2012, the album won a Grammy Award for Best World Music Album.

== Track listing ==
No.	Title	Writer(s)	Length
1.	"Imidiwan Ma Tenam"	Ibrahim Ag Alhabib	4:41
2.	"Asuf D Alwa"	Ibrahim Ag Alhabib	4:14
3.	"Tenere Taqhim Tossam"	Ibrahim Ag Alhabib, Tunde Adebimpe, Kyp Malone, Eyadou Ag Leche	4:13
4.	"Ya Messinagh"	Ibrahim Ag Alhabib	5:30
5.	"Walla Illa"	Ibrahim Ag Alhabib	4:54
6.	"Tameyawt"	Ibrahim Ag Alhabib	4:39
7.	"Imidiwan Win Sahara"	Ibrahim Ag Alhabib	3:45
8.	"Tamiditin Tan Ufrawan"	Ibrahim Ag Alhabib	3:04
9.	"Tiliaden Osamant"	Ibrahim Ag Alhabib	3:26
10.	"Djeredjere"	Liya Ag Ablil, Ahmed, Keddou Ag Ossad	4:38
11.	"Iswegh Attay"	Sanou Ag Ahmed	5:50
12.	"Takest Tamidaret"	Abdallah Ag Alhousseyni	4:41
Total length:			53:30

Note: A two-disc special edition of the album includes a bonus disc with the tracks "Djegh Ishilan", "El Huria Telitwar", "Kud Edazamin", and "Nak Ezzaragh Tinariwen".

== Personnel ==
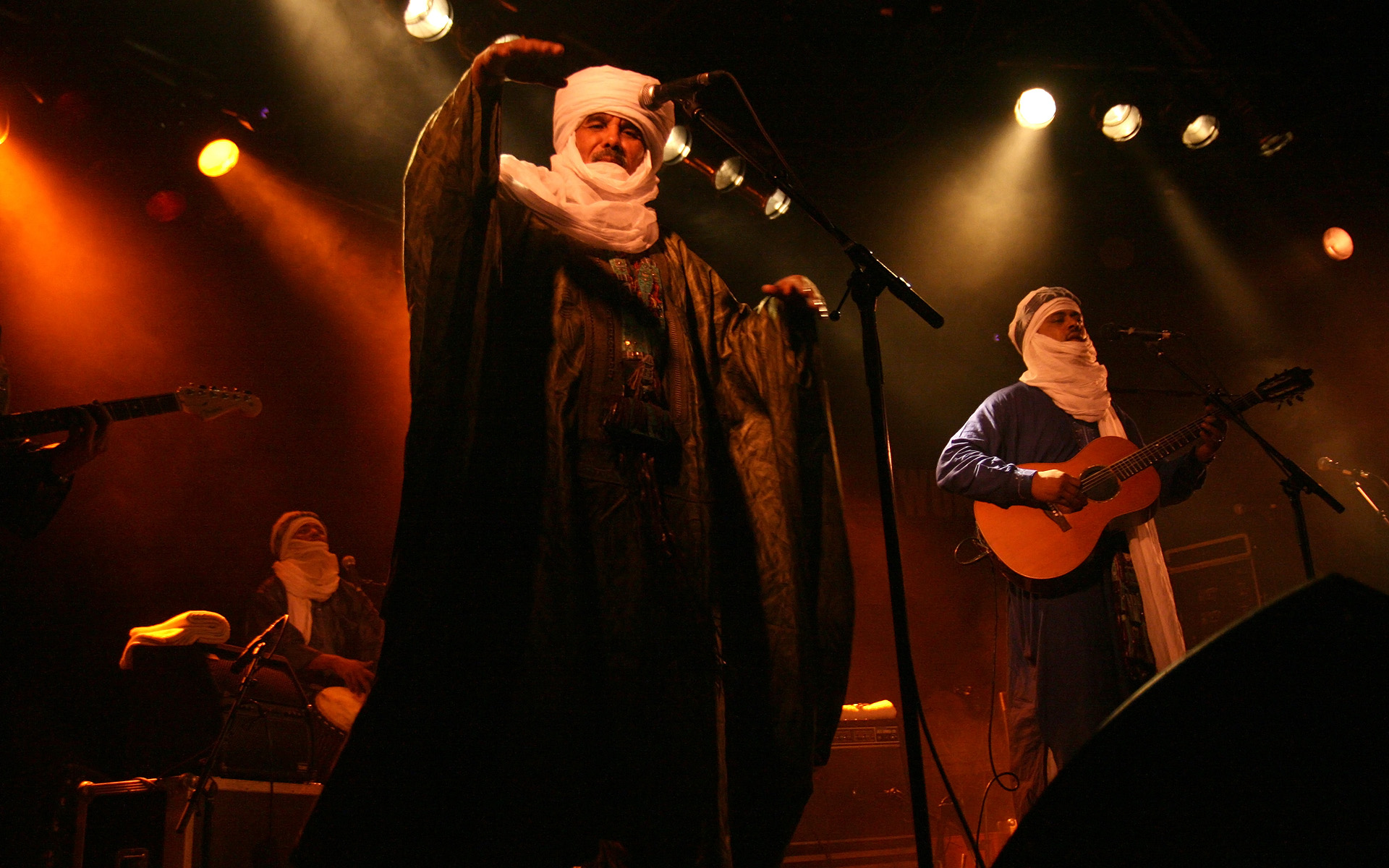
Alhassane Ag Touhami (center) and Abdallah Ag Alhousseyni (right) performing with Tinariwen in Vienna, 2011.

All information from album liner notes.

- Ibrahim Ag Alhabib – lead vocals and lead guitar (except track 12)
- Abdallah Ag Alhousseyni – lead vocals and lead guitar (track 12)
- Alhassane Ag Touhami –backing vocals (all tracks)
- Eyadou Ag Leche – bass, guitar, percussion, backing vocals (all tracks), lead vocals (track 3)
- Elaga Ag Hamid – guitar, backing vocals (all tracks)
- Said Ag Ayad – percussion, backing vocals (all tracks)
- Mohamad Ag Tahada – percussion, backing vocals (all tracks)
- Mustapha Ag Ahmed – backing vocals (all tracks)
- Aroune Ag Alhabib – guitar, backing vocals (track 11)
- Kyp Malone – guitar (tracks 3, 5, 11), vocals (tracks 2, 11)
- Tunde Adebimpe – vocals (tracks 3, 5, 7)
- Nels Cline – guitar (track 1)
- Dirty Dozen Brass Band – horns (track 4)
