= The Radio Tisdas Sessions =

Studio album by Tinariwen
- Released: 6 August 2001
- Recorded: January 2000
- Studio: Radio Tisdas, Kidal
- Genre: Blues; rock; folk; world
- Label: Wayward
- Producer: Justin Adams; Lo'Jo

Tinariwen chronology
Ténéré (1993)	The Radio Tisdas Sessions (2001)	Amassakoul (2004)

Professional ratings
Review scores
Source	Rating
AllMusic	4/5 stars
Robert Christgau	B+

The Radio Tisdas Sessions is a 2001 album by the Malian group Tinariwen. The album was recorded at Kidal's local Tuareg station, Radio Tisdas, by producers Justin Adams and Lo'Jo. While Tinariwen had previously recorded several cassette-only albums for regional markets, The Radio Tisdas Sessions was their first on CD and their first to be distributed worldwide.

== Track listing ==
No.	Title	Length
1.	"Le Chant des Fauves"	7:30
2.	"Nar Djenetbouba"	4:44
3.	"Imidiwaren"	6:24
4.	"Zin es Gourmeden"	5:19
5.	"Afours Afours"	5:24
6.	"Tessalit"	3:56
7.	"Kheddou Kheddou"	6:10
8.	"Mataraden Anexan"	5:45
9.	"Bismillah"	4:20
10.	"Tin-Essako" (recorded live at Le Festival au Désert in Tin-Essako, Mali)	3:11
