= Music of Mauritania =

The music of Mauritania comes predominantly from the country's largest ethnic group: the Moors. In Moorish society musicians occupy the lowest caste, iggawin. Musicians from this caste used song to praise successful warriors as well as their patrons. Iggawin also had the traditional role of messengers, spreading news between villages. In modern Mauritania, professional musicians are paid by anybody to perform; affluent patrons sometimes record the entertainment, rather than the musicians themselves, and are then considered to own the recording.

== Instruments ==
Traditional instruments include an hourglass-shaped four-stringed lute called the tidinit and the woman's kora-like ardin. Percussion instruments include the tbal (a kettle drum) and daghumma (a rattle).

== Types of Mauritanian music ==
There are three "ways" to play music in the Mauritanian tradition:

- Al-bayda - the white way, associated with delicate and refined music, and the Bidan (North African Moors)
- Al-kahla - the black way, associated with roots and masculine music, and the Haratin (Sub-Saharan Moors)
- l'-gnaydiya - the mixed or "spotted" way

Music progresses through five modes (a system with origins in Arabic music): karr, fagu (both black), lakhal, labyad (both white, and corresponding to a period of one's life or an emotion) and lebtyat (white, a spiritual mode relating to the afterlife). There are further submodes, making for a complicated system, one to which nearly all male musicians conform. Female musicians are rare and are not bound by the same set of rules.

== Musicians ==
In spite of the rarity of female musicians in Mauritania, the most famous Moorish musician is a woman, Dimi Mint Abba. Dimi's parents were both musicians (her father had been asked to compose the Mauritanian national anthem), and she began playing at an early age. Her professional career began in 1976, when she sang on the radio and then competed, the following year, in the Umm Kulthum Contest in Tunis.

Another popular female musician is Malouma, who is also a respected politician and social activist ("Desert of Eden," Shanachie Records [U.S.], 1998).

Another esteemed female musician is Noura Mint Seymali.

Mauritania has also rappers in the Hip-hop movement. Professional Hip-hop started in the late 2000s.

== See also ==
- Arabic music
- Arabic pop music
