= Tidinet =

String instrument

The tidinet is a type of string instrument from Mauritania and other regions in North Africa. It is most often only played by men. The tidinet resembles a small guitar and is used by griots.

It is similar in appearance to the tahardant, or ahardin (not to be confused with ardin).
