= Kel Tinariwen =

Studio album by Tinariwen
- Released: 1992
- Recorded: 1991
- Studio: JBZ Studios, Abidjan, Côte d'Ivoire
- Genre: Desert blues
- Length: 36:13
- Language: French, Tamasheq

Tinariwen chronology
Kel Tinariwen (1992)	Ténéré (1993)

Kel Tinariwen is the debut album by Malian desert blues group Tinariwen, released in 1992 and re-released in 2022 by Wedge Records. It has received generally favorable reviews.

== Reception ==
According to the review aggregator Metacritic, Kel Tinariwen received "generally favorable reviews" based on a weighted average score of 67 out of 100 from four critic scores. Editors at AllMusic rated this album 4 out of 5 stars, with critic Matt Collar writing that the influence of Western pop/rock artists along with African ones and with "that vibrant mix of influences you can really hear on the twangy, soulful cuts... which really do sound like Van Morrison or Bob Dylan collaborating with a Malian band" and the album's sound is also reminiscent of David Byrne work with Talking Heads and Luaka Bop. The site also listed this among their favorite archival releases of 2022. Mojo's David Hutcheon gave this album 2 out of 5 stars, calling it "inessential recordings" with poor arrangements". Writing for PopMatters, Adriane Pontecorvo rated this album a 9 out of 10, writing that listening to it "30 years after its release feels a little surreal" for seeing the synthpop influences on this release and the band's evolution, but noting that this "serves as a testament to their artistic strength".

== Track listing ==
1. "À l’Histoire" – 5:01
2. "Mas Azalene Wi Amoutenene" – 4:13
3. "Adounia Tarha" – 4:31
4. "Matadjem Yinmexan" – 4:20
5. "Amoud Falas Aljalat" – 4:22
6. "Ayat Sendad Eghlalane" – 4:07
7. "Tenidagh Hegh Dejredjere" – 4:39
8. "Arghane Manine" – 5:00

== Personnel ==
Tinariwen

- Liya ‘Diarra’ Ag Ablil – bass guitar, lead guitar, lead vocals, backing vocals
- Abdallah Ag Alhousseyni – lead guitar, lead vocals, backing vocals
- Kedou Ag Ossad – lead guitar, lead vocals, backing vocals
- Hassan ‘Abin Abin’ Ag Touhami – lead guitar, lead vocals, backing vocals

Other personnel

- Lala Casanova – lyrics translation
- François Gravouil – project management
- Pierre Houon – keyboards, drum programming, recording, engineering, mixing
- Andy Morgan – English lyrics translation
- Thibault Proux – design (2022 re-release)
- Keltoum Sennhauser – lead vocals, backing vocals, executive production, liner notes
- Hassan Ag Touhami – rhythm guitar
- Patrick Vo-Tan – production (2022 re-release)
- Benjamin Weber – mastering

== See also ==
- List of 1992 albums
