= Elwan =

Studio album by Tinariwen
- Released: 10 February 2017
- Recorded: United States, France, Morocco
- Genres: African blues, desert blues, world
- Length: 46:10
- Labels: Anti-, Epitaph

Tinariwen chronology
Emmaar (2014)	Elwan (2017)	Amadjar (2019)

Professional ratings
Aggregate scores
Source	Rating
Metacritic	86/100
Review scores
Source	Rating
AllMusic	4/5 stars
Exclaim!	8/10
The Guardian	4/5 stars
Pitchfork	8.2/10

Elwan is the seventh album by the Tuareg band Tinariwen, released in 2017. The title means "elephants" in Tamashek and the term is used as a metaphor for militias and corporations that have trampled the fragile natural and human ecosystems of the desert. The album was partially recorded in Joshua Tree National Park (as was its predecessor Emmaar) with additional recording in Paris, France and M'hamed El Ghizlane, Morocco. The album includes guest appearances by Matt Sweeney, Kurt Vile, Mark Lanegan, and Alain Johannes. One reviewer called the album "devastatingly beautiful," and another described the album as "musing on the values of ancestry, unity and fellowship, driven by the infectiously hypnotic cyclical guitar grooves that wind like creepers around their poetic imagery." AllMusic named Elwan as one of the best albums of 2017.

== Track listing ==
No.	Title	Writer(s)	Length
1.	"Tiwàyyen"	Ibrahim Ag Alhabib / Eyadou Ag Leche	3:45
2.	"Sastanàqqàm"	Abdallah Ag Alhousseyni	3:24
3.	"Nizzagh Ijbal"	Abdallah Ag Alhousseyni	3:39
4.	"Hayati"	Ibrahim Ag Alhabib / Moulay El Wafi	3:23
5.	"Ittus"	Hassan Ag Touhami	3:45
6.	"Ténéré Tàqqàl"	Ibrahim Ag Alhabib	4:25
7.	"Imidiwàn n-àkall-in"	Ibrahim Ag Alhabib	3:33
8.	"Talyat"	Ibrahim Ag Alhabib	4:14
9.	"Assàwt"	Abdallah Ag Alhousseyni	3:39
10.	"Arhegh ad annàgh"	Ibrahim Ag Alhabib	2:47
11.	"Nànnuflày"	Eyadou Ag Leche / Mark Lanegan	5:03
12.	"Fog Edaghàn (Intro Flute)"	Tinariwen	1:26
13.	"Fog Edaghàn"	Tinariwen	3:07

Note: Tracks 12–13 are bonus tracks in some editions of the album.

== Personnel ==
All information from album liner notes.

- Ibrahim Ag Alhabib – lead vocals and lead guitar (1, 4, 6, 7, 10, 11)
- Abdallah Ag Alhousseyni – lead vocals and lead guitar (2, 3, 8, 9); backing vocals, claps
- Alhassane Ag Touhami – lead vocals and lead guitar (5); backing vocals, claps
- Eyadou Ag Leche – bass, backing vocals, claps; electric guitar (1, 6); guembri (7)
- Elaga Ag Hamid – guitars, backing vocals, claps
- Said Ag Ayad – djembe, calebasse, backing vocals
- Iyad Moussa Ben Abderahmane – electric guitars (1, 4, 8, 11); backing vocals (4)
- Mina Walet Oumar – you-you vocal (1, 7)
- Said Laghferi, Abdul Wahab Cheich, M'Bark Bellal, Melghaynine Sifori (the kids from M'hamid) – backing vocals (7, 10)
- Abdelkader Ourzig, Tahar Khaldi, Hicham Bouhasse, Haiballah Akhamouk – backing vocals (4)
- The Gangas de Tagounite (Ohga Bilal, Erzgi Mohamed, Ohga Aziz, Ergbi Abdil Latif) – tambours and percussion (3, 6, 7, 10)
- Amar Chaoui – additional percussion
- Kurt Vile – electric guitar (1, 11)
- Matt Sweeney – electric guitar (1, 8)
- Alain Johannes – guitar (8)
- Mark Lanegan – vocals (11)

== Charts ==
Chart	Peak position
Belgian Albums (Ultratop Flanders)	31
Belgian Albums (Ultratop Wallonia)	68
French Albums (SNEP)	87
Dutch Albums (Album Top 100)	104
US Heatseekers Albums (Billboard)	10
US Independent Albums (Billboard)	36
