= Tinariwen =

Collective of Tuareg musicians from the southern Sahara Desert

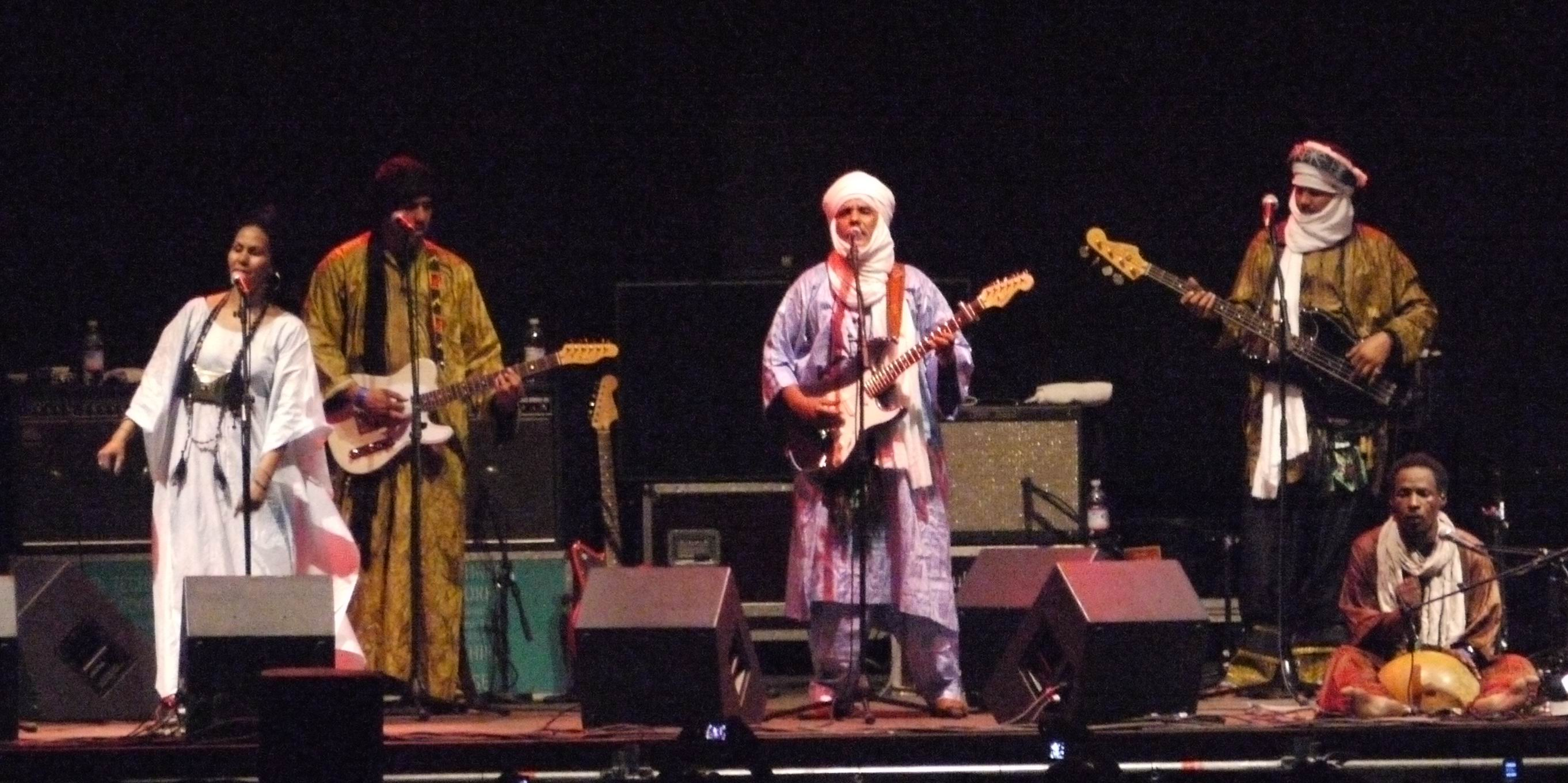
- Tinariwen performing in Nuremberg, 2010

Background information
- Origin: Tamanrasset, Algeria; Tessalit, Mali
- Genres: Tishoumaren; world; blues; folk; rock
- Years active: 1979–present
- Labels: Independiente, EMMA Productions, Tribal Union, Wayward Records, Outside Music, World Village Records, Anti, Epitaph
- Website: www.tinariwen.com

Tinariwen (Tamasheq: ⵜⵏⵔⵓⵏ; with vowels ⵜⵉⵏⴰⵔⵉⵡⵉⵏ; plural of ténéré meaning "desert") is a collective of Tuareg musicians from the Sahara region of southern Algeria and of northern Mali, in the region of Azawad. Considered pioneers of desert blues, the group's guitar-driven style combines traditional Tuareg and African music with Western rock music. The collective first convened in the late 1970s and released their first studio album in the early 1990s. They began touring internationally in the early 2000s.

The group was founded by Ibrahim Ag Alhabib; he and bandmates Alhassane Ag Touhami and Abdallah Ag Alhousseyni have all been present since 1979. Tinariwen first started to gain a following outside the Sahara region in 2001 with the release of the album The Radio Tisdas Sessions. Their most recent album Hoggar was released in 2026.

The group has been nominated for Grammy Awards three times, and their 2012 album Tassili won the award for Best World Music Album in 2012. NPR calls the group "music's true rebels", AllMusic deems the group's music "a grassroots voice of rebellion", and Slate calls the group "rock 'n' roll rebels whose rebellion, for once, wasn't just metaphorical".

== Biography ==
=== Background ===
At four years old, Ibrahim Ag Alhabib witnessed the execution of his father, a Tuareg rebel, during a 1963 uprising in Mali. After seeing a western film in which a cowboy played a guitar, Ag Alhabib built his own guitar out of "an oil can, a stick and a bicycle brake wire", according to future bandmate Abdallah Ag Alhousseyni. During his childhood, Ag Alhabib lived in Algeria in refugee camps near Bordj Badji Mokhtar and in the deserts around the southern city of Tamanrasset. It was in Tamanrasset where he was given a guitar by an Algerian man, who also taught Ibrahim how to play the Algerian style of Tergui music.

Later, Ag Alhabib resided in Algeria and Libya with other Tuareg exiles. He acquired his first real acoustic guitar in 1979. During this period he formed a band with Alhassane Ag Touhami and brothers Inteyeden and Liya Ag Ablil to play at parties and weddings. While the group had no official name, people began to call them Kel Tinariwen, which in the Tamashek language translates as "The People of the Deserts" or "The Desert Boys".

In 1980 Libyan ruler Muammar al-Gaddafi put out a decree inviting all young Tuareg men who were living illegally in Libya to receive full military training. Gaddafi dreamed of forming a Saharan regiment, made up of young Tuareg fighters, to further his territorial ambitions in Chad, Niger, and elsewhere in the region. Ag Alhabib and his bandmates answered the call and received nine months of training. During such exercises, the band met additional Tuareg musicians and formed a loosely-organized collective to create songs about the issues facing the Tuareg people. They built a makeshift studio and vowed to record music for free for anyone who supplied a blank cassette tape. The resulting homemade cassettes were traded widely throughout the Sahara region.

In 1989 the collective left Libya and moved to Ag Alhabib's home country of Mali, where he returned to his home village of Tessalit for the first time in 26 years. In 1990 the Tuareg people of Mali revolted against the government, with some of the musicians of the collective participating as rebel fighters, including Iyad Ag Ghaly, who would later establish and lead the Jama'at Nusrat al-Islam wal-Muslimin (JNIM). After a peace agreement known as the Tamanrasset Accords was reached in January 1991, the musicians left the rebel movement and devoted themselves to music full-time. In 1991, some members of Tinariwen went to Abidjan, Côte d'Ivoire, to record a cassette at JBZ Studios and the album Kel Tinariwen was released later that year. They played occasional gigs for far-flung Tuareg communities throughout the Sahara region, gaining word-of-mouth popularity among the Tuareg people.

=== 1998–2009: International recognition ===
In 1993, the Tuareg humanitarian Manny Ansar became the group's manager. Ansar initially organized concerts for the collective in Bamako, until realizing that there was international demand for Tuareg music. Tinariwen was then organized as an official band with about a dozen named members. In 1998, Tinariwen came to the attention of the French world music ensemble Lo'Jo and their manager Philippe Brix. That group traveled to a music festival in Bamako and met two members of the Tinariwen collective. In 1999, some members of Tinariwen traveled to France and performed with Lo'Jo under the name Azawad.

In 2001, Ansar organized the inaugural Festival au Désert in Tin Essako, Mali. The concert was in collaboration with Lo'Jo and the Belgian Sfinks Festival, with Tinariwen headlining. Their debut full-length album, The Radio Tisdas Sessions, was recorded by Justin Adams and Jean-Paul Romann at the radio station of the same name in Kidal, Mali (the only Tamashek-speaking station in the region) and released in 2001. It was Tinariwen's first recording to be released outside of northern Africa.

Since 2001 Tinariwen have toured regularly in Europe, North America, Asia, and Australia. Also since 2001 the collective has added several younger Tuareg musicians who did not live through the military conflicts experienced by the older members but have contributed to the collective's multi-generational evolution. Newer members include bassist Eyadou Ag Leche, percussionist Said Ag Ayad, guitarist Elaga Ag Hamid, and guitarist Abdallah Ag Lamida.

Their 2004 album Amassakoul ("The Traveller" in Tamashek) and their 2007 album Aman Iman ("Water Is Life") were released worldwide and gained the notice of celebrity fans including Carlos Santana, Robert Plant, Bono, the Edge, Thom Yorke, Chris Martin, Henry Rollins, Brian Eno, and members of TV on the Radio. In 2005, Tinariwen received a BBC Award for World Music, and in 2008 they received Germany's prestigious Praetorius Music Prize. The band's 2009 album Imidiwan: Companions was recorded in a mobile studio by Jean-Paul Romann in Tessalit. The band's UK debut was in Liverpool, at the Africa Oye festival in 2004. The band also appeared at the Glastonbury Festival in 2004, and again in 2009.

=== 2010s ===
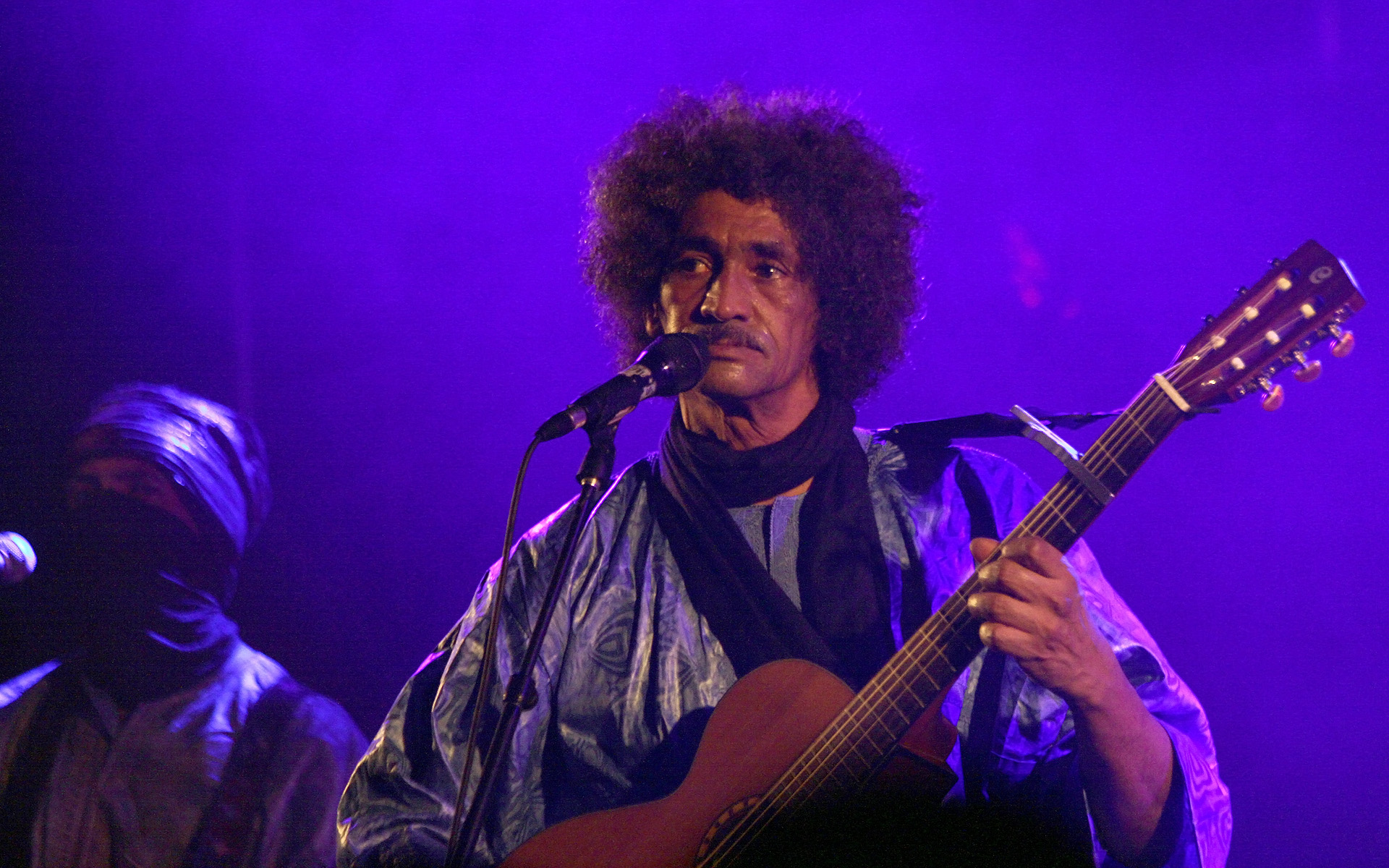
Ibrahim Ag Alhabib performing with Tinariwen in Vienna in 2011

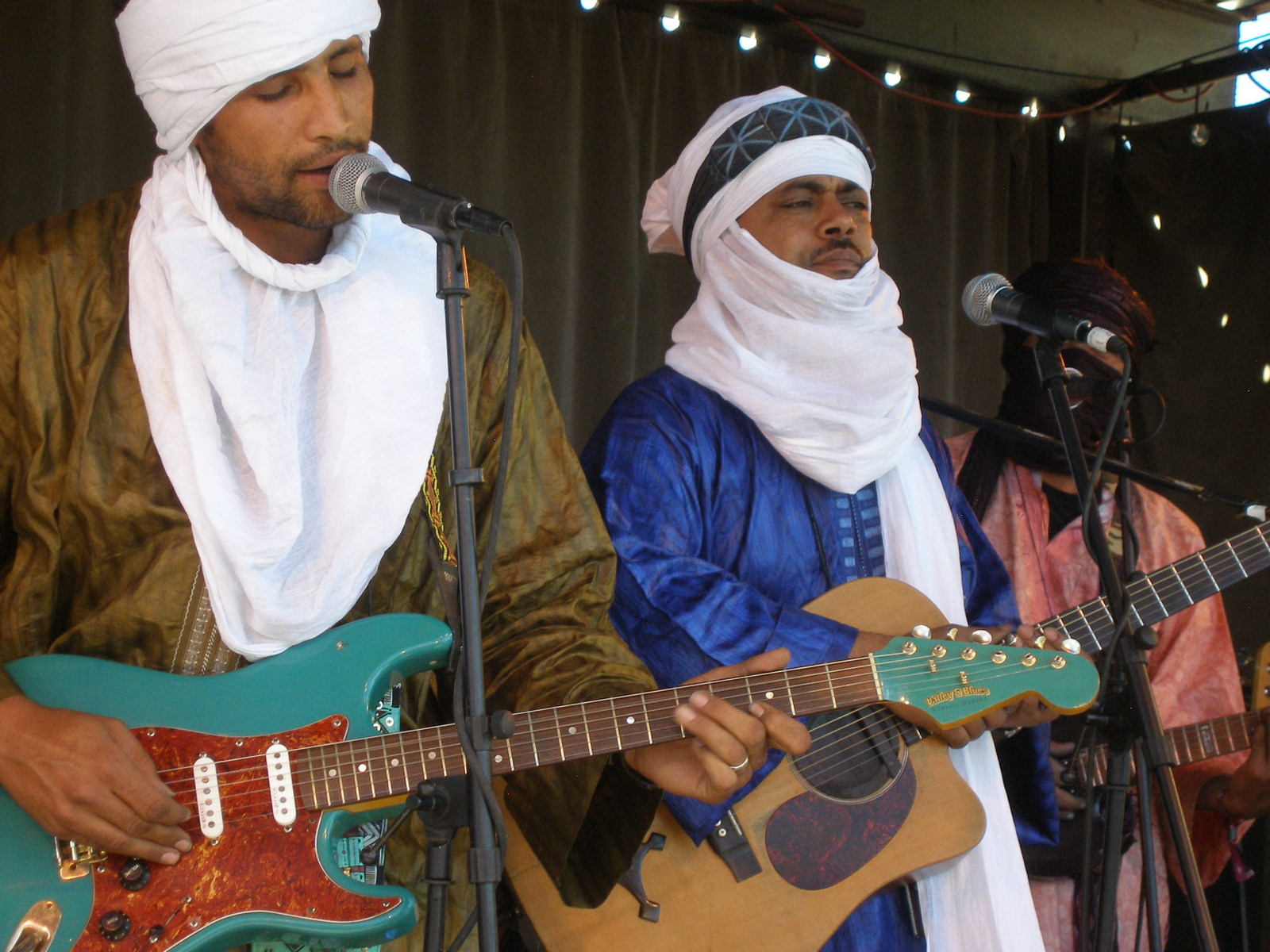
Tinariwen performing in 2011

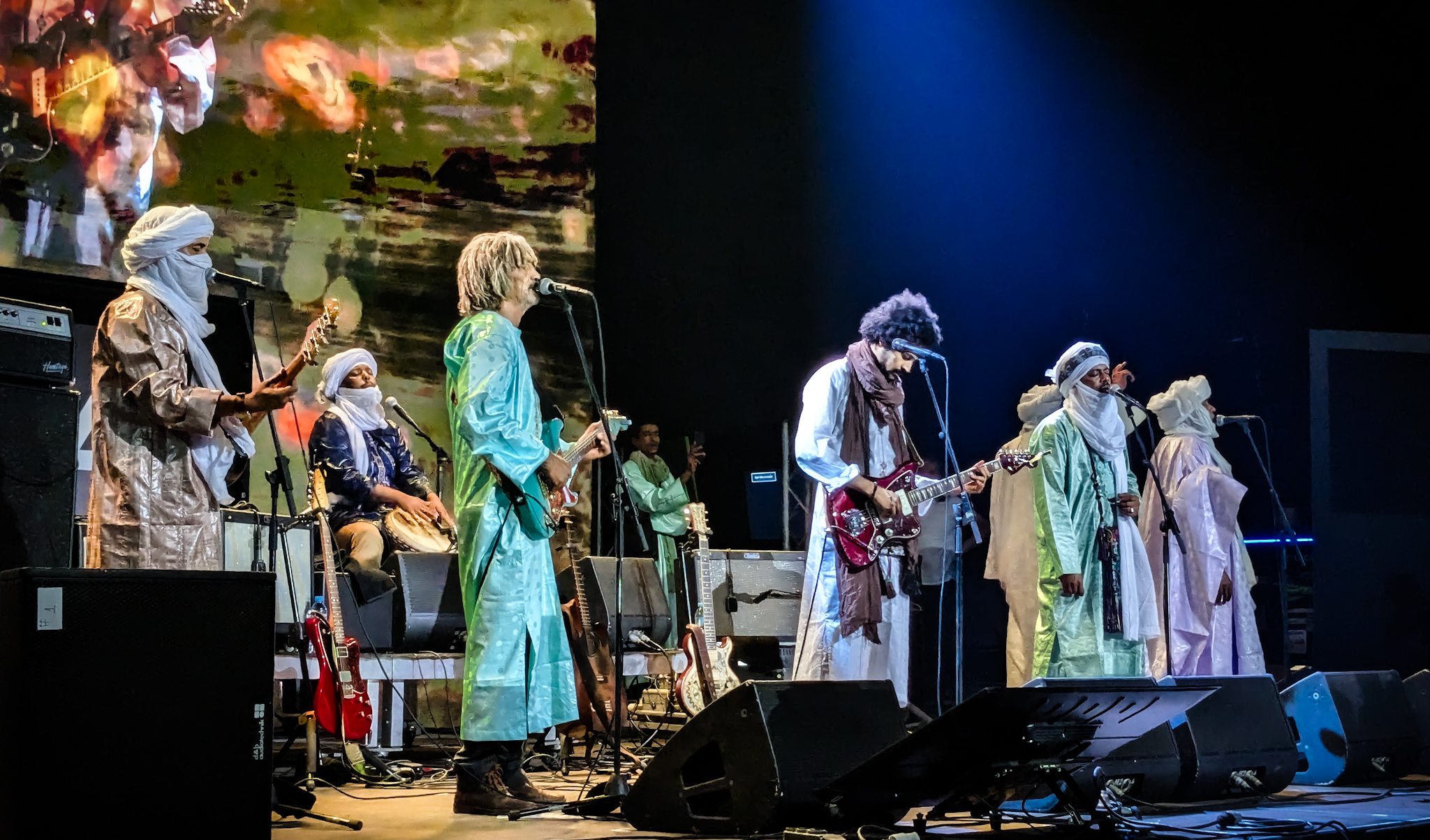
Tinariwen in Algiers 2024

In 2010, Tinariwen represented Algeria in the opening ceremony of the 2010 FIFA World Cup in South Africa, and completed a lengthy American tour. The band released their fifth album Tassili in 2011, featuring guest appearances by Nels Cline, The Dirty Dozen Brass Band, and Tunde Adebimpe and Kyp Malone of TV on the Radio. Ian Brennan produced the album. The album won the Award for Best World Music Album at the 54th Grammy Awards. Their world tour in 2011 included performances at the End of the Road Festival and All Tomorrow's Parties. Tinariwen appeared on The Colbert Report on 29 November 2011 with Adebimpe and Malone to play two songs from Tassili. Group members Ibrahim Ag Alhabib, Alhassane Ag Touhami, and Eyadou Ag Leche participated in a translated interview with Colbert. They appeared at the January 2012 Festival au Désert, where they were joined on stage by Bono and Bassekou Kouyate.

In early 2012 there was another Tuareg rebellion in Tinariwen's home region of northern Mali, with the National Movement for the Liberation of Azawad declaring independence and forming the short-lived unrecognized state Azawad. Another party in the rebellion, the militant Islamist group Ansar Dine, denounced the presence of popular music in the territory, and Tinariwen was targeted specifically during this campaign. During this period, Tinariwen had scheduled a tour of Australia and New Zealand, but Ibrahim Ag Alhabib and Elaga Al Hamid were not able to get out of Mali due to the conflict. Members of Lo'Jo joined the rest of Tinariwen on stage at the WOMADelaide festival.

In a January 2013 confrontation with Ansar Dine militants, who had denounced Tinariwen and their music, Abdallah Ag Lamida was abducted while trying to save his guitars. A few weeks later, Tinariwen reported that Ag Lamida had been released and was "safe and free". During Ag Lamida's captivity, several other members of Tinariwen fled from the conflict and resettled temporarily in the southwestern United States to record their sixth album, Emmaar, with guests including Josh Klinghoffer, Fats Kaplin, Matt Sweeney, and Saul Williams. Recording took place at Joshua Tree National Park in California, which features a desert environment similar to that of Tinariwen's homeland. Emmaar was released worldwide in 2014. Tinariwen then embarked on a tour of Europe and North America, but without group leader Ibrahim Ag Alhabib, who decided to remain in Mali to attend to family issues caused by the latest political crisis. Bassist Eyadou Ag Leche assumed the role of musical director, and a new singer/guitarist named Iyad Abderrahmane was recruited to perform Ag Alhabib's parts during the tour.

In 2016, the group returned to Joshua Tree National Park to record parts of their seventh album, Elwan, with additional recording in France and the remote settlement of M'Hamid El Ghizlane in southern Morocco (home of the Festival Taragalte). The album was released in 2017 and featured guest appearances by Matt Sweeney, Kurt Vile, Mark Lanegan, and Alain Johannes. Tinariwen then embarked on an American tour with Dengue Fever as support. The group toured Europe, Asia, Australia, and New Zealand through 2018, with another appearance at WOMADelaide. After the international tour, Tinariwen were unable to return to their home area in northern Mali due to ongoing sectarian violence and threats from Islamist militants. The group instead decamped in Morocco and embarked on a multi-month journey through Western Sahara and Mauritania, collaborating with local musicians at several stops along the way and writing songs while camped out in the desert.

Their eighth album, Amadjar, was recorded outdoors with mobile equipment near Nouakchott, Mauritania and was released in 2019. Amadjar featured guest appearances by Noura Mint Seymali, Micah Nelson, Cass McCombs, Stephen O'Malley, and Warren Ellis.

=== 2020s ===
In 2022, Tinariwen began a project to reissue several of their earlier albums in new formats; the first such release was the album Kel Tinariwen, which collects several of the group's early recordings from the 1990s. Their ninth album, Amatssou, was produced by Daniel Lanois and was released in May 2023. Another world tour included a performance at the Glastonbury Festival.

On 28 August 2024 the group performed at one of the Late Night Proms at the Royal Albert Hall in London. A compilation of early demos and rarities titled Idrache (Traces of the Past) was released in November 2024. Their tenth album, Hoggar, was released in March 2026. The album addresses a renewed round of violence in the group's home country of Mali, fueled by the paid mercenary organization Wagner Group that was hired by various parties in a multi-sided religious and ethnic conflict.

== Musical style and influence ==
Tinariwen's sound is primarily guitar-driven, in the style known as assouf among the Tuareg people. The group's guitar style has its roots in West African music and other traditional styles practiced by the Tuareg and Berber peoples; it has often been characterized as "desert blues". Tinariwen was also influenced by traditional Malian musicians, most notably Ali Farka Touré, and regional pop singers like Rabah Driassa. While the Tinariwen style is possibly a distant relative of blues music, via West African music, members of Tinariwen claim to have never heard actual American blues music until they began to travel internationally in the early 2000s. Tinariwen was also influenced by American and British rock acts whose bootlegged albums had made it to the Sahara region, such as Dire Straits, Santana, Led Zeppelin, Bob Dylan, and Jimi Hendrix.

Tinariwen has been named as a formative influence on a growing Tuareg rock scene, made up of younger musicians who were not rebels like the members of Tinariwen but have experienced their region's recent struggles with poverty and terrorism. The band Imarhan is led by Sadam Iyad Moussa Ben Abderamane, who has collaborated with Tinariwen and is the nephew of bassist Eyadu ag Leche. Kel Assouf and Tamikrest have gained notice as younger Tuareg rock bands that cite Tinariwen as a fundamental influence. The band Terakaft consists of several musicians who have played with Tinariwen. The band Tissilawen has cited Tinariwen as primary inspiration for their sound and has covered several Tinariwen songs.

== Band members ==
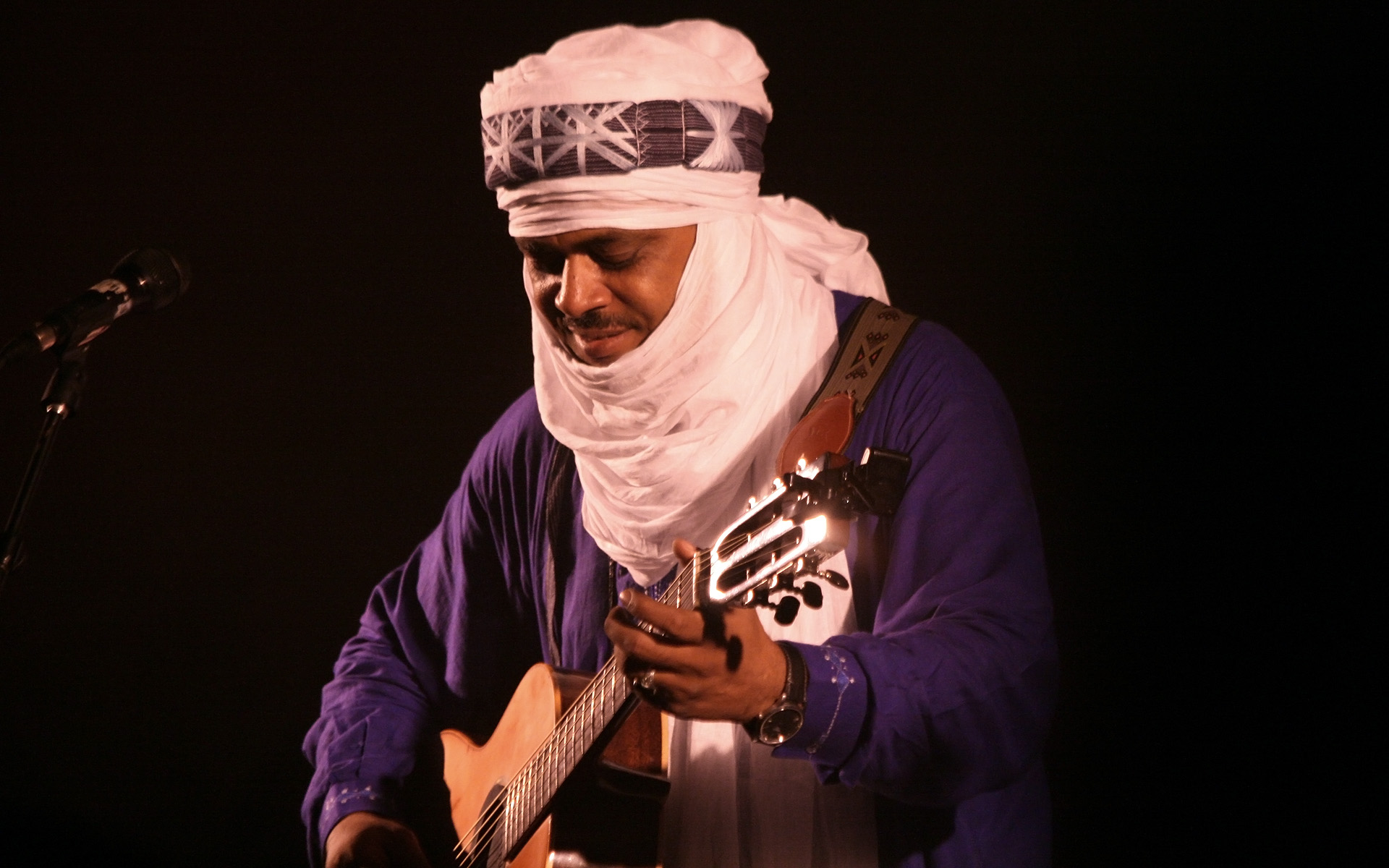
Abdallah Ag Alhousseyni performing with Tinariwen in Vienna in 2011

Tinariwen is a collective of singers, songwriters, and musicians who come together in different combinations to play concerts and to record. This is because of the nomadic lifestyle of the Tuareg people and the difficulties of transportation and communication in the Sahara region. The group rarely brings a consistent line-up on its international tours, though several members tour regularly.

=== Active touring members ===
- Ibrahim Ag Alhabib – guitar, vocals (founding member)
- Alhassane Ag Touhami – guitar, vocals (founding member)
- Abdallah Ag Alhousseyni – guitar, vocals (founding member)
- Iyad Moussa Abderrahmane – guitar, vocals
- Eyadou Ag Leche – bass guitar, guitar, percussion, vocals, backing vocals
- Said Ag Ayad – percussion, backing vocals
- Elaga Ag Hamid – guitar, backing vocals
- Cheik Ag Tiglia – bass
- Sanou Ag Hamed – guitar, vocals

=== Non-touring or previous members ===
- Inteyeden Ag Ablil – guitar, vocals (founding member; died 1994)
- Liya "Diarra" Ag Ablil – guitar, vocals (founding member)
- Abdallah "Intidao" Ag Lamida – guitar, backing vocals
- Mohammed Ag Tahada – percussion
- Iyad Moussa Abderrahmane – guitar, vocals
- Mohammed "Japonais" Ag Itlale – guitar, vocals (died 2021)
- Kedou Ag Ossad – guitar, vocals
- Sweiloum – guitar, vocals
- Foy Foy – guitar, vocals
- Abouhadid – guitar, vocals
- Wonou Walet Sidati – vocals
- Kesa Malet Hamid – vocals
- Mina Walet Oumar – vocals
- Wonou Walet Oumar – vocals (died 2005)
- Iyad Ag Ghaly – percussion

== Awards ==
- In 2012 Tinariwen won Best Group at the Songlines Music Awards.
- In 2012 Tassili won the Grammy Award for Best World Music Album.
- In 2017 Elwan was nominated for the Grammy Award for Best World Music Album.
- In 2020 Amadjar was nominated for the Grammy Award for Best Global Music Album.
- In 2020 Amadjar won the Libera Award for best world music album.

== Discography ==
=== Studio albums ===
Tinariwen studio albums
Year	Album	Peak positions								Certification
Year	Album	BEL (Fl)	BEL (Wa)	FRA	NED	NOR	SWE	SWI	UK	Certification
1992	Kel Tinariwen	—	—	—	—	—	—	—	—	
1993	Ténéré	—	—	—	—	—	—	—	—	
2001	The Radio Tisdas Sessions	—	—	—	—	—	—	—	—	
2004	Amassakoul	—	—	80	—	—	—	—	—	
2007	Aman Iman: Water Is Life	—	—	72	84	—	41	—	—	
2009	Imidiwan: Companions	68	—	82	81	—	—	—	—	
2011	Tassili	33	46	95	—	15	—	—	68	
2014	Emmaar	61	115	90	—	—	—	92	—	
2017	Elwan	31	68	87	—	—	—	47	—	
2019	Amadjar	74	—	—	—	—	—	—	—	
2023	Amatssou	—	—	—	—	—	—	—	—	
2026	Hoggar	—	—	—	—	—	—	—	—	

=== Others ===
- The Soul Rebel of African Desert (soundtrack, 2006)
- Live in Paris (live, 2016)
- Idrache (Traces of the Past) (compilation, 2024)

=== Contributing artist ===
- The Rough Guide to Desert Blues (2010)
- The Imagine Project – Herbie Hancock (2010) ("Tamatant Tilay/Exodus" with K'naan and Los Lobos)
