= Aman Iman =

Studio album by Tinariwen
- Released: 13 March 2007
- Studio: Bogolan Studios (Bamako)
- Genre: Desert blues; folk; world
- Length: 54:11
- Label: World Village
- Producer: Justin Adams

Tinariwen chronology
Amassakoul (2004)	Aman Iman (2007)	Imidiwan: Companions (2009)

Professional ratings
Review scores
Source	Rating
AllMusic	4/5 stars
MusicOMH	4.5/5 stars
Pitchfork	8.1/10
Robert Christgau	A−

Aman Iman ("Water Is Life" in Tamashek) is a 2007 album by the Malian band Tinariwen, produced by Justin Adams. The album was recorded in just two weeks in Bamako, Mali. AllMusic praised the album as "a glorious syncopated noise that puts most rockers to shame. But there's a wonderful looseness to the sound." Pitchfork called the album "the most powerful statement they've issued so far" and in the words of the BBC, "Aman Iman successfully balances the upbeat with the plaintive, and density of sound with sparseness."

== Track listing ==
No.	Title	Writer(s)	Length
1.	"Cler Achel"	Ibrahim Ag Alhabib	4:25
2.	"Mano Dayak"	Abdallah Ag Alhousseyni	4:41
3.	"Matadjem Yinmixan"	Ibrahim Ag Alhabib	5:43
4.	"Ahimana"	Mohammed Ag Itlale ("Japonais")	4:56
5.	"Soixante Trois"	Ibrahim Ag Alhabib	4:11
6.	"Toumast"	Abdallah Ag Alhousseyni	4:25
7.	"Imidiwan Winakalin"	Ibrahim Ag Alhabib	4:25
8.	"Awa Didjen"	Mohammed Ag Itlale ("Japonais")	4:11
9.	"Ikyadarh Dim"	Ibrahim Ag Alhabib	3:35
10.	"Tamatant Tilay"	Alhassane Ag Touhami	3:19
11.	"Assouf"	Ibrahim Ag Alhabib	3:56
12.	"Izarharh Tenere"	Ibrahim Ag Alhabib	5:02
Total length:			54:11

== Personnel ==
All information from album liner notes.

- Ibrahim Ag Alhabib – lead vocals and lead guitar (tracks 1, 3, 5, 7, 9, 11, 12)
- Abdallah Ag Alhousseyni – lead vocals and lead guitar (tracks 2, 6), guitar (tracks 8, 9), backing vocals (all tracks)
- Alhassane Ag Touhami – lead vocals and lead guitar (track 10), backing vocals (all tracks)
- Mohammed Ag Itlale ("Japonais") – lead vocals and lead guitar (tracks 4, 8), guitar (tracks 9, 12)
- Eyadou Ag Leche – bass (all tracks), backing vocals (all tracks)
- Elaga Ag Hamid – guitar (all tracks), backing vocals (all tracks)
- Said Ag Ayad – percussion (all tracks), backing vocals (all tracks)
- Abdallah Ag Lamida ("Intidao") – guitar (all tracks), backing vocals (all tracks)
- Wounou Walet Sidati – backing vocals (all tracks)
- Kesa Walet Hamid – backing vocals (all tracks)
- Mama Livio, Manaki Diallo – you-yous (tracks 1, 2, 3, 7)
- Hamid Ekawel – backing vocals (track 2)
- Justin Adams – guitar (tracks 1, 2, 3, 11)
- Salah Dawson Miller – percussion (tracks 1, 10)
