= Emmaar =

Studio album by Tinariwen
- Released: 10 February 2014
- Recorded: April/May 2013, United States
- Genres: African blues; world
- Length: 48:59 (61:50 with bonus tracks)
- Label: Anti-

Tinariwen chronology
Tassili (2011)	Emmaar (2014)	Elwan (2017)

Professional ratings
Review scores
Source	Rating
AllMusic	4/5 stars
The Guardian	4/5 stars
Pitchfork	8.1/10
PopMatters	8/10 stars

Emmaar is the sixth album by the Tuareg band Tinariwen, released in 2014. Emmaar is a Tuareg word meaning "the heat on the breeze". It is their first full album not to be recorded in northern Africa.

After Tinariwen's previous album Tassili won the Grammy Award for Best World Music Album in 2012, the band was displaced by a Tuareg rebellion in their home region of northern Mali, with Islamist militants abducting guitarist Abdallah Ag Lamida. Other members of the band fled to the southwestern United States, writing and recording Emmaar in and around Joshua Tree National Park, which features a desert environment similar to their homeland. The album's lyrics deal primarily with the band's exile and the political strife in their home country, and it includes guest contributions from Josh Klinghoffer, Fats Kaplin, Matt Sweeney, and Saul Williams.

== Track listing ==
No.	Title	Writer(s)	Length
1.	"Toumast Tincha"	Eyadou Ag Leche	4:20
2.	"Chaghaybou"	Abdallah Ag Alhousseyni	4:54
3.	"Arhegh Danagh"	Ibrahim Ag Alhabib	4:03
4.	"Timadrit In Sahara"	Ibrahim Ag Alhabib	3:51
5.	"Imidiwan Ahi Sigdim"	Ibrahim Ag Alhabib	4:51
6.	"Tahalamot"	Abdallah Ag Alhousseyni	5:04
7.	"Sendad Eghlalan"	Ibrahim Ag Alhabib	4:55
8.	"Imidiwanin Ahi Tifhamam"	Abdallah Ag Alhousseyni	4:37
9.	"Koud Edhaz Emin"	Ibrahim Ag Alhabib	4:33
10.	"Emajer"	Ibrahim Ag Alhabib	3:37
11.	"Aghregh Medin"	Alhassane Ag Touhami	4:20
12.	"Adounia Ti Chidjret"		4:18
13.	"Islegh Taghram Tifhamam"		4:21
14.	"Tin Ihlan"		4:06
Total length:			61:50

Note: Tracks 12–14 are bonus tracks in some editions of the album.

== Personnel ==
All information from album liner notes.

- Ibrahim Ag Alhabib – lead vocals and lead guitar (tracks 1, 3, 4, 5, 7, 9, 10)
- Abdallah Ag Alhousseyni – lead vocals and lead guitar (tracks 2, 6, 8), backing vocals (all other tracks)
- Alhassane Ag Touhami – lead vocals and lead guitar (track 11), backing vocals (all other tracks)
- Eyadou Ag Leche – bass (all tracks), lead vocals and lead guitar (track 1), guitar (track 11), backing vocals (all tracks)
- Elaga Ag Hamid – guitar (all tracks), backing vocals (all tracks)
- Said Ag Ayad – percussion (all tracks), backing vocals (all tracks)
- Amar Chaoui – percussion (tracks 1, 2, 3, 7, 9, 10)
- Toulout Kiki – backing vocals (tracks 2, 10)
- Josh Klinghoffer – guitar (tracks 1,4)
- Fats Kaplin – fiddle (track 8), pedal steel guitar (tracks 1, 7, 9)
- Matt Sweeney – guitar (track 10)
- Saul Williams – vocals (track 1)
