= Amatssou =

Studio album by Tinariwen
- Released: 19 May 2023
- Recorded: Mauritania; Tassili N’Ajjer National Park, Algeria
- Genre: African blues, world
- Length: 47:01
- Label: Wedge Records

Tinariwen chronology
Amadjar (2019)	Amatssou (2023)	Hoggar (2026)

Professional ratings
Review scores
Source	Rating
AllMusic	4/5 stars

Amatssou is the ninth album by the Tuareg band Tinariwen, released on 19 May 2023. The album's title means "beyond the fear" in the Tamashek language. The album features contributions from Fats Kaplin and was produced by Daniel Lanois.

== Background ==
Following the success of their previous album Amadjar, Tinariwen was invited by Jack White to record their next album at his studio in Nashville, Tennessee. Those plans were thwarted by the COVID-19 pandemic, when Tinariwen were unable to travel outside their home area in northern Africa. The group instead set up a mobile recording studio in Algeria's Tassili N’Ajjer National Park, with some additional recording taking place at a camp in Mauritania. Daniel Lanois produced the masters remotely at his studio in Los Angeles, California and selected some backing musicians who traveled to Tinariwen's recording locations. Contributions from percussionist Amar Chaoui were recorded in Paris, France.

With input from Lanois, the album adds elements of country rock, bluegrass, and American folk music that had not been explored by Tinariwen before, with some additional experiments in rock and psychedelic music. One reviewer compared the album's sound and attitude to outlaw country.

== Reception ==
The album received positive reviews from critics. Timothy Monger AllMusic called the album "compelling and strange... [Tinariwen] are a musical entity like no other, translating the essence of their culture through creative exploration and complementary collaborations, yet always attuned to their inner compass." Tom Taylor of Far Out called the album "a singular swell of music that quenches the soul’s thirst for spiritualism in these hectic times like the first sip of a cold drink after ambling to a watering hole on a hot summer’s day."

According to Holly Hazelwood of Spectrum Culture, "Amatssou is an immersive experience, beautifully plundering the sounds of everything from Southern rock to German psych-rock, the interplay between musicians beckoning you inward, ready to hit you with another fascinating blend of sounds." Exclaim! noted the musical variety of the album, calling it "Tinariwen's most sonically varied affair" that "seamlessly combines drawling banjo, sooty fiddle and Lanois' moody production, all while sounding wholly like themselves." The album also received a positive review from Glide Magazine.

Critics also noted the album's lyrical themes on the travails of oppressed peoples and the continuing challenges faced by the Tuareg people due to military hostilities and social unrest in their home region of Mali and Nigeria. Financial Times called Amatssou "an angry album full of betrayal." According to Adriane Pontecorvo of Pop Matters, "Tinariwen sing of martyrs, battles, unity, and hopes for the future, advocating for justice." While John Lewis of Uncut noted that album's lyrics reflect "an object lesson in how messy and complicated rebellion can be," David Hutcheon of Mojo described Amatssou as "An unforgettable fire [that] still burns in the Sahara."

== Track listing ==
Amatssou track listing
No.	Title	Writer(s)	Length
1.	"Kek Algham"	Abdallah Ag Alhousseyni	3:32
2.	"Tenere Den"	Touhami Ag Alhassane / Eyadou Ag Leche	3:32
3.	"Arajghiyine"	Ibrahim Ag Alhabib	3:50
4.	"Imzad (Interlude)"	Ibrahim Ag Alhabib	1:02
5.	"Tidjit"	Ibrahim Ag Alhabib	5:13
6.	"Jayche Atarak"	Ibrahim Ag Alhabib	6:00
7.	"Imidiwan Mahitinam"	Touhami Ag Alhassane / Eyadou Ag Leche	3:33
8.	"Ezlan"	Abdallah Ag Alhousseyni	5:28
9.	"Anemouhagh"	Ibrahim Ag Alhabib	3:45
10.	"Iket Adjen"	Abdallah Ag Alhousseyni	3:24
11.	"Nak Idnizdjam"	Ibrahim Ag Alhabib	5:29
12.	"Tinde (Interlude)"	Ibrahim Ag Alhabib	2:13
Total length:			47:01

== Personnel ==
- Ibrahim Ag Alhabib – lead vocal and lead guitar (tracks 3, 4, 5, 6, 9, 11, 12)
- Abdallah Ag Alhousseyni – lead vocals and lead guitar (tracks 1, 8, 10), backing vocals (all tracks)
- Alhassane Ag Touhami – lead vocals and lead guitar (track 2, 7), backing vocals (all tracks)
- Eyadou Ag Leche – bass, backing vocals (all tracks)
- Elaga Ag Hamid – guitar, backing vocals (all tracks)
- Said Ag Ayad – percussion, backing vocals (all tracks)
- Wes Corbett – banjo (track 1)
- Fats Kaplin – banjo, pedal steel guitar, violin (tracks 2, 8, 9, 11)
- Daniel Lanois – pedal steel guitar, piano (tracks 3, 6)
- Machar Fatimata – vocals (tracks 4, 12)
- Amar Chaoui – percussion
