= Amassakoul =

2004 studio album by Tuareg band Tinariwen

Studio album by Tinariwen
- Released: 12 October 2004
- Genres: Tishoumaren; African blues
- Length: 45:53
- Label: World Village

Tinariwen chronology
The Radio Tisdas Sessions (2001)	Amassakoul (2004)	Aman Iman (2007)

Professional ratings
Review scores
Source	Rating
AllMusic	4/5 stars
Robert Christgau	A−

Amassakoul ("The Traveler" in Tamashek) is the second studio album by the Tuareg band Tinariwen that was released October 12, 2004. Following the release, Amassakoul continued to gain attention leading to Tinariwen perform at the fourth Festival au Desert. In October 2004, the group had their first U.S. tour dates.

== Reviews ==
In a review of the album, Chris Nickson of AllMusic stated, "This is angry and passionate; it's dangerous music in the very best sense. Western bands might have forgotten how to rock as if their lives depended on it; Tinariwen can teach them." Jon Lusk of the BBC noted, "you'll be happy to discover that this music has a similar power to transport you to the heats of the Sahara." PopMatters, an online magazine, concluded that "this is a band whose music is not only mesmerizing but is destined to find wide appeal to many listeners of all ages."

Track number 5, "Chet Boghassa" (The Women of Boghassa) of the album was later covered by Mdou Moctar. The New Yorker wrote in an article that Chet Boghassa is, "one of their best rebel songs". The lyrics reflect a promise to take back Tuareg village from the Malian Army. The title track "Amassakoul 'N' Ténéré" has over 4 million streams on Spotify.

== Track listing ==
No.	Title	Writer(s)	Length
1.	"Amassakoul 'N' Ténéré"	Ibrahim Ag Alhabib	3:24
2.	"Oualahila Ar Tesninam"	Ibrahim Ag Alhabib	3:47
3.	"Chatma"	Ibrahim Ag Alhabib	5:36
4.	"Arawan"	Abdallah Ag Alhousseyni	4:06
5.	"Chet Boghassa"	Abdallah Ag Alhousseyni	3:52
6.	"Amidinin"	Alhassane Ag Touhami	2:51
7.	"Ténéré Daféo Nikchan"	Ibrahim Ag Alhabib	3:54
8.	"Aldhechen Manin"	Ibrahim Ag Alhabib	3:54
9.	"Alkhar Dessouf"	Ibrahim Ag Alhabib	4:55
10.	"Eh Massina Sintadoben"	Alhassane Ag Touhami	4:29
11.	"Assoul"	Ibrahim Ag Alhabib	4:08
Total length:			45:53

== Personnel ==
All information from album liner notes.

- Ibrahim Ag Alhabib – lead vocals and lead guitar (tracks 1, 2, 3, 7, 8, 9, 11), guitar (tracks 6, 9, 10), flute (tracks 7, 9, 11), backing vocals (tracks 4, 5, 6, 10, 11)
- Abdallah Ag Alhousseyni – lead vocals and lead guitar (tracks 4, 5), guitar (tracks 8, 10), percussion (tracks 2, 9), backing vocals (all tracks except 4, 5, 7)
- Alhassane Ag Touhami – lead vocals and lead guitar (tracks 6, 10), guitar (tracks 1, 2), backing vocals (tracks 1, 2, 3, 4, 5, 8, 9, 11)
- Eyadou Ag Leche – bass (all tracks except 7, 9, 11), backing vocals (all tracks except 7), percussion (tracks 1, 2, 5, 8, 9, 10)
- Elaga Ag Hamid – guitar (all tracks except 7, 11), backing vocals (all tracks except 7)
- Said Ag Ayad – percussion (all tracks except 7, 11), backing vocals (all tracks except 3, 4, 7)
- Bakaye Ag Ayad – percussion (all tracks except 4, 7, 11)
- Mina Walet Oumar – backing vocals (all tracks except 7, 10)
- Wounou Walet Oumar – backing vocals (tracks except 2, 4)
- Issa Dicko – backing vocals (track 2)
- Bastien Gsell – flute (track 9), didjeridoo (track 11)
