= Dimi Mint Abba =

Mauritanian singer (1958–2011)

Dimi Mint Abba Arabic: ديمي منت آبا
- Also known as: "la diva du désert"
- Born: Loula Bint Siddaty Ould Abba; December 25, 1958; Tidjikja, Mauritania
- Died: June 4, 2011 (aged 52) Casablanca, Morocco
- Genre: griot
- Years active: 1976-2011

Dimi Mint Abba (Arabic: ديمي منت آبا; 25 December 1958 – June 2011) was one of Mauritania's most famous musicians. She was born Loula Bint Siddaty Ould Abba in Tidjikja in Mauritania, 1958, into a low-caste ("iggawin") family specializing in the griot tradition.

== Life and career ==
Dimi's parents were both musicians (her father had been asked to compose the Mauritanian national anthem), and she began playing at an early age. Her professional career began in 1976, when she sang on the radio and then competed, the following year, in the Umm Kulthum Contest in Tunis. Her winning song "Sawt Elfan" ("Art's Plume") has the refrain "Art's Plume is a balsam, a weapon and a guide enlightening the spirit of men", which can be interpreted to mean that artists play a more important role than warriors in society.

Her first international release was on the World Circuit record label, following a recommendation from Ali Farka Touré. On this album, she was accompanied by her husband Khalifa Ould Eide and her two daughters. Later she composed famous and popular Mauritanian songs like "Hailala" and "Koumba bay bay". Dimi toured African countries widely, Europe in (1989) and (2006) respectively, the United States (US) in (1993), Australia in (2009).

She died on June 4, 2011, in Casablanca, Morocco, of a cerebral hemorrhage, following a stage accident in Aioun ten days before, when she was singing for a Sahrawi public. Her death was described as "a national loss" by Mohamed Ould Abdel Aziz, the former President of Mauritania.

== Discography ==
Albums

- Khalifa Ould Eide & Dimi Mint Abba, Moorish Music from Mauritania. World Circuit WCD 019, 1990.
- Dimi Mint Abba, Music and Songs of Mauritania, Auvidis Ethnic 1992.

Contributing artist

- The Rough Guide to West African Music, World Music Network, 1995
- Unwired: Africa, World Music Network, 2000

== See also ==
- Music of Mauritania
- Noura Mint Seymali
- Malouma
