= Lo'Jo =

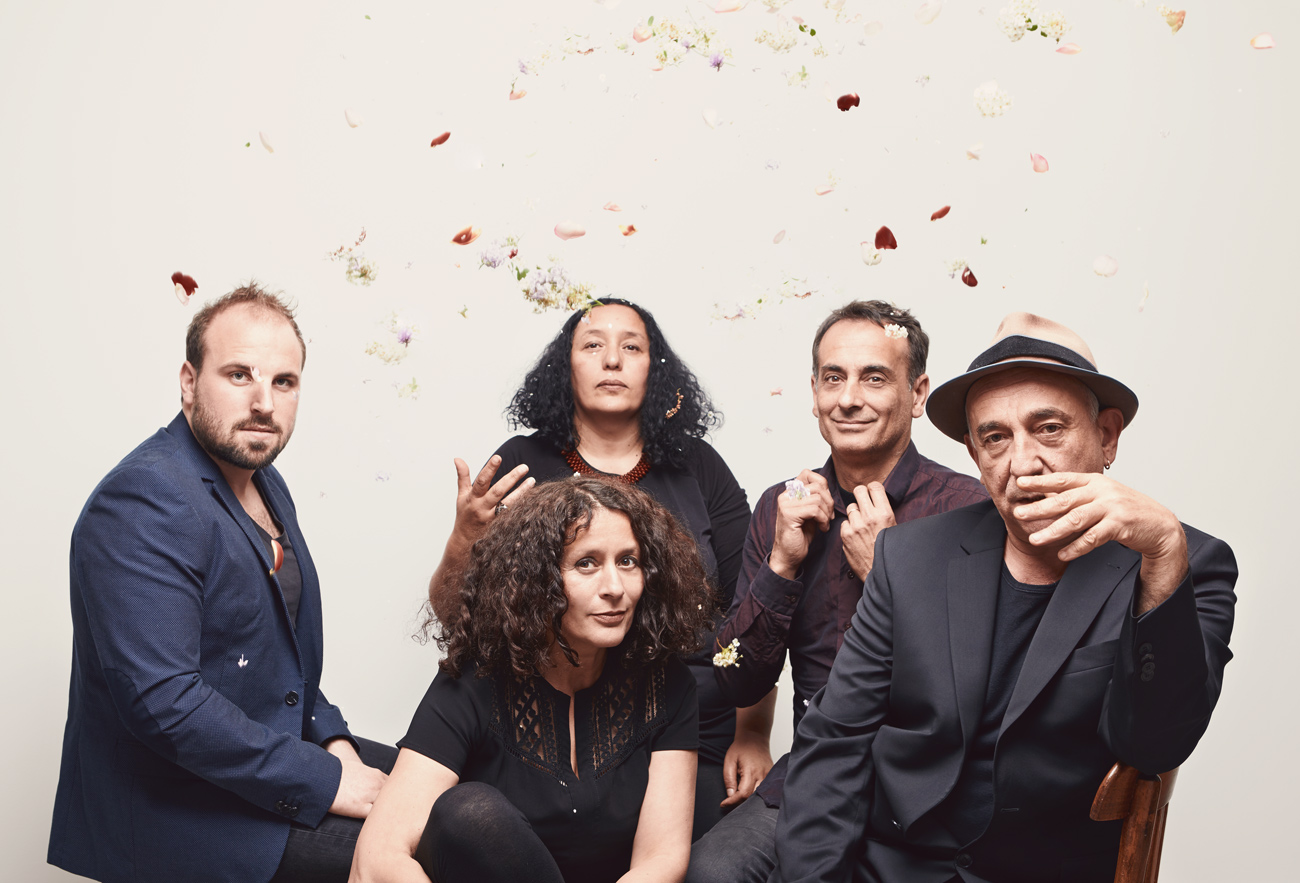
- Lo'Jo

Background information
- Origin: Angers, France
- Genres: World music
- Years active: 1982–present
- Members: Denis Péan; Richard Bourreau; Kham Meslien; Baptiste Brondy; Yamina Nid el Mourid; Nadia Nid el Mourid
- Past members: Matthieu Rousseau; Franck Vaillant
- Website: http://www.lojo.org/

Lo'Jo (formerly Lo'Jo Triban) is a French band, gathering a group of France-based musicians of various origins, performing and recording a blend of world music, with strong Romani, North African as well as French folk elements.

== History ==
The band was founded in 1982 in Angers, France, by singer/keyboardist Denis Péan and Richard Bourreau (violin/kora). These two have remained central to Lo'Jo throughout their history. For several years, with a rotating cast of members, they played events locally, working with acrobats, street theatre, mime, dancers and film as part of their overall presentation. They have subsequently maintained a communal lifestyle, based in Angers.

By the end of the 1980s, they were playing throughout Europe and had appeared in New York as part of an artists' collective. Including Nicholas 'Kham' Meslien (bass) and Matthieu Rousseau (drums) (later replaced by Franck Vaillant), they consolidated their line-up, and their first album, Fils de Zamal, was released in 1993. In 1995 the group added Berber singer/saxophonist Yamina Nid El Mourid and her sister, Nadia, who brought a strong North African influence to the music. In 1996, the new lineup recorded Sin Acabar, and 1997 saw them complete Mojo Radio, both with English producer Justin Adams. Upon the latter's release they found more acclaim in the world music community, getting them on the WOMAD circuit.

In 1999, they journeyed to Bamako, Mali, to begin work on Bohème de Cristal. While in Mali, they became involved in the organization of the Desert Music Festival held in January 2001. They have also collaborated with a wide variety of musicians, including Tinariwen.

In 2002, they released the acclaimed album, Au Cabaret Sauvage (originally issued in France as L'une des Siens). This was followed by a live album Ce Soir Là (2003), and a new studio album Bazar Savant (2006). In 2009, they released the album Cosmophono, and toured in the UK.

== Discography ==
- Fils De Zamal (1993)
- Sin Acabar (1996)
- Mojo Radio (1998)
- Bohême De Cristal (2000)
- Au Cabaret Sauvage (issued in France as L'Une des Siens) (2002)
- Ce Soir Là... (Live) (2003)
- Bazar Savant (2006)
- Tu Connais Lo'Jo? (2007, compilation)
- Cosmophono (2009)
- Cinema El Mundo (2012)
- 310 Lunes (2014)
- Fonetiq Flowers (2017)
- Transe de papier (2020)
- Feuilles Fauves (2024)

=== Other contributions ===
- Hear Music Volume 7: Waking (2002, Hear Music) - "Kamarad"
