= Noura Mint Seymali =

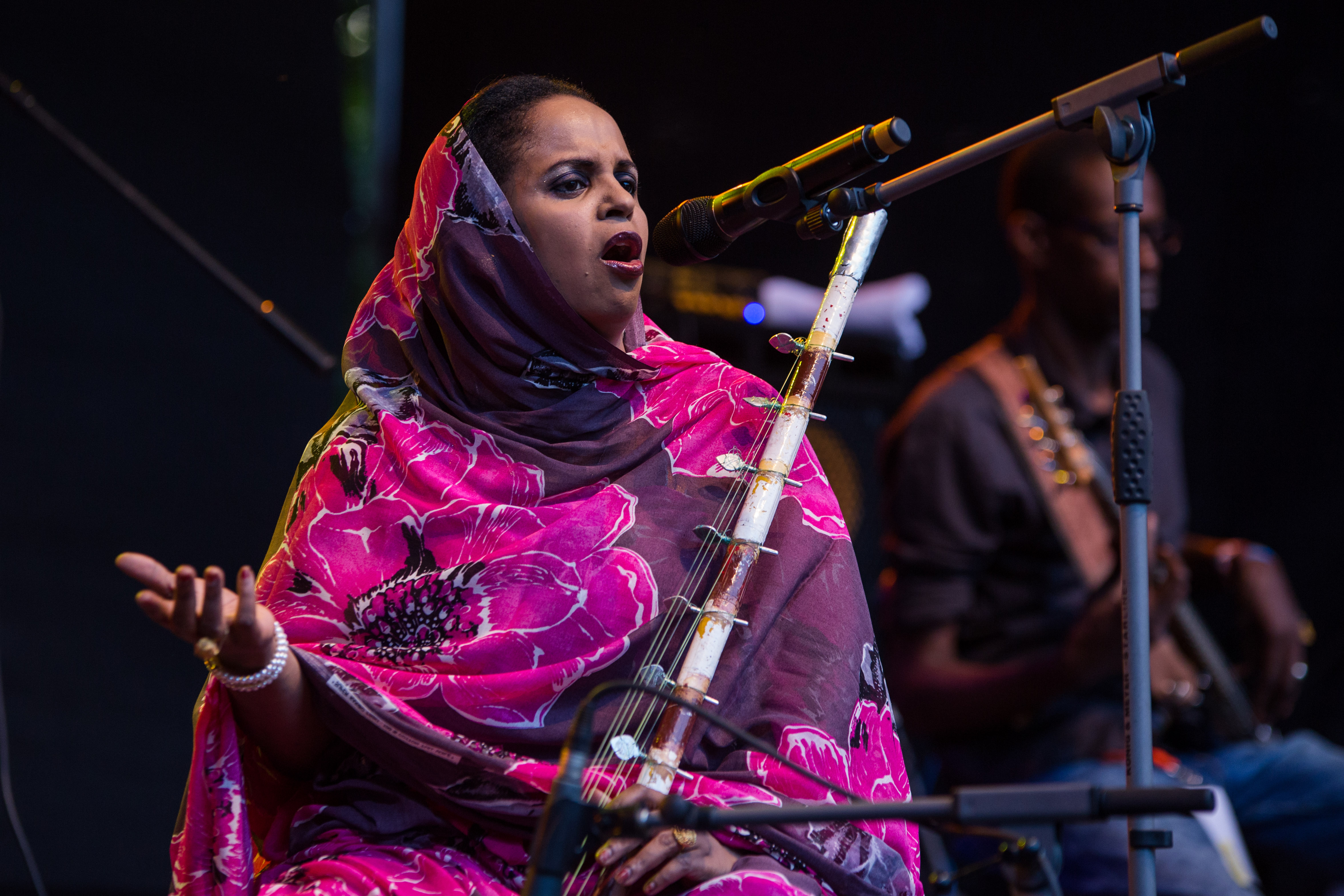
- Noura Mint Seymali in 2015

Background information
- Born: Mauritania
- Occupations: singer, songwriter, instrumentalist
- Instrument: vocals
- Years active: 1990s–present

Noura Mint Seymali is a Mauritanian griot, singer, songwriter, and instrumentalist.

== Early life ==
Noura Mint Seymali was born in Mauritania to parents Dimi Mint Abba and Seymali Ould Ahmed Vall. Both parents were important musical figures in Mauritania. Her father, Seymali, is a Moorish composer who adapted Mauritania's national anthem. Her step-mother, Dimi, was one of her country's most famous singers, and was known as the "diva of the desert". At the age of 13, Noura began composing for her mother, as well as touring with her as a backup singer. Through the musical members of her family, she was able to master the ardin, a nine-stringed harp reserved for women, as well as get her feet wet in the world of performances.

Following her marriage to her guitarist, Jeiche Ould Chighaly, Noura began playing weddings with him. With the help of her husband, they formed their first band in 2004. After the local release of two albums, they returned to the studio to create the band's first full-length album, Tzenni. The album was released in 2014 via Glitterbeat Records. The band continues to play at music festivals around the world. Her 2016 album Arbina was noted for its "fiery vocals [and] unconventional instrumentation".

Noura is trained in playing the ardin, the traditional Mauritanian instrument for female griots. She considers herself and her music to be non-political in nature. In 2018, Noura hosted the Malian Tuareg band Tinariwen during their travels in Mauritania, and appeared on their 2019 album Amadjar.

== Band history ==
Noura Mint Seymali has performed in many places around the world since their band formation in 2004. Some of the famous festivals that they've performed at are globalFEST, located in the United States; Festival au Désert, in Mali; and Hayy Festival, in Egypt. Noura Mint Seymali's combination of different genres of Moorish music with pop music has given them a large platform of audiences. Her band includes Jeiche Ould Chighaly on guitar and tidinit, Ousmane Tour on bass, Matthew Tinari on drums, Ayniyana Chighaly on backing vocals and ardin, and Mayassa Hemed Vall on backing vocals and percussion.

== Discography ==
- Tarabe (2006)
- El Howl (2010)
- Azawan (2012) (EP)
- Azawan II (2013) (EP)
- Tzenni (2014)
- Arbina (2016)
- Yenbett (2025)
