= Ahardin =

Musical bow

String Instrument
- Classification: Chordophone
- Hornbostel–Sachs classification: 311.111 (Mono-idiochord musical bow)

Ahardin is a musical bow played by southern Tuaregs consists of a curved branch held with a twisted rope of raw leather or bark of acacia. Serving as a sound box, a reversed calabash is placed on the curved part of the bow on the ground. To hold the whole, the player presses her knee on the container. With the fingers of the left hand, as with the imzad, she defines the melody, while with the thumb and forefinger of the right hand, she grip the string with a regular gesture vibrate. At present, the ahardin, an instrument whose manufacture is easily improvised, is considered above all as a game of girls.

Tahardant, feminine of ahardin, is also the name of a plucked string instrument, a kind of guitar played throughout the region of the Niger River loop, by "court craftsmen" in the Tuaregs and by griots in the Songhai.
