= Ardin (harp) =

Type of harp played in Mauritania

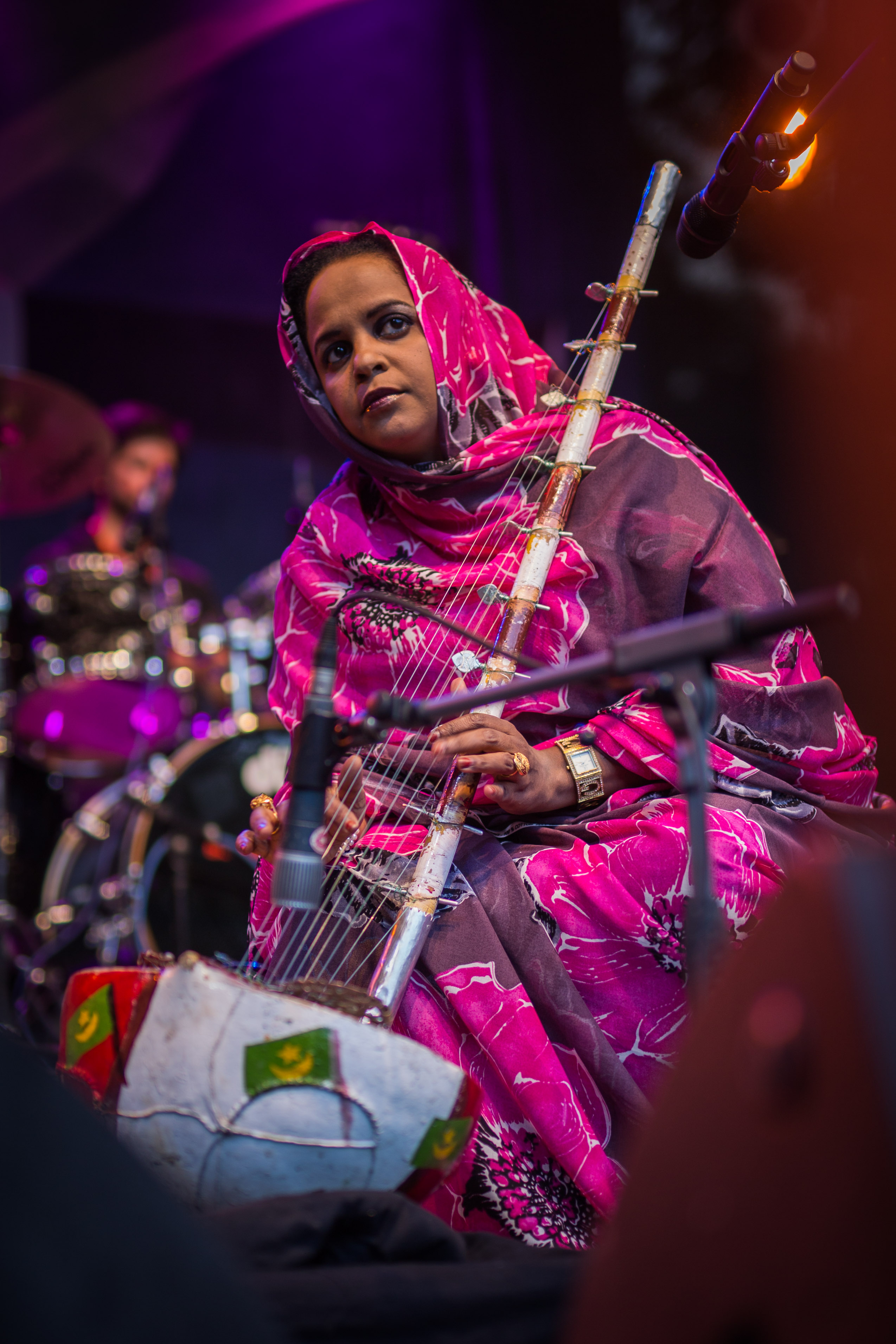
Noura Mint Seymali playing the ardin.

The ardin is a type of traditional harp played in Mauritania. It has a resonating body made of calabash and is played by female iggawin, or griots.

== Etymology ==
The word ardin, possibly derived from the Fulbe word ardo, "to lead," also describes a higher tuning adopted by the lead koni (xalam) during a duet performance. Eric Charry posits that the existence of these similarities, and of the kora tuning called Hardino, demonstrates cultural diffusion among the western African sahel-savanna music system. It may also be related etymologically to tahardant, a Tuareg word for the instrument more similar in appearance to the tidinit.

== Description ==
The ardin is a stringed instrument constructed with a calabash sound box covered in leather, often highly decorated with paintings, with a wooden neck 100 cm (40 in) long. It typically has between 10 and 16 strings. (Note: The number of strings is variously reported: for example, "eleven or fourteen", "twelve or fourteen", and fourteen to seventeen.) The ardin is traditionally played by women, and is a smaller counterpart to the kora, which is played by men and has 21 strings. The strings are attached to tuning pegs on the neck and adjoin a metal plate with rings on the soundboard which vibrates when the strings are plucked. The leather sound board may also be beaten like a drum.

== History ==
French travel writer Michel Jajolet de la Courbe documented the existence of the instrument in West Africa as early as 1685.

French: Ensuitte, elles firent chanter le'ur guiriote; elle tenoit une espèce de harpe dont le corps fait d'une calbace couverte de cuir avoit dix ou douze cordes qu'elle touchoit assez agréablement; elle commença donc a entonner une chanson arabe assez mélodieuse, mais fort languissante, a peu près a la manière des Espagnols ou Portugais, l'accompagnant de sa harpe avec beaucoup de mesure; mais ce qu'il y avoit de plus agréable c'est qu'elle se passionnoit extrêmement et faisoit quantité de petites façons et de mouvements de teste, faisant remuer a mesure tous les gris gris et pendeloques, montrant les plus belles dents du monde; tout ce que je trouvay a redire, c'est que ses mots parroissoient extrêmement rudes et comme tirez du gosier.

[Then, they had their griot sing; she held a kind of harp whose body made of a calabash covered with leather had ten or twelve strings which she played quite pleasantly; she then began to intone a rather melodious Arabic song, but very languid, almost in the manner of the Spanish or Portuguese, accompanying it with her harp with great measure; but what was most agreeable was that she became extremely passionate and made a number of little gestures and movements of the head, making all the gris gris and pendants move in time, showing the most beautiful teeth in the world; all that I found to complain about was that her words appeared extremely harsh and as if drawn from the throat.]

— Michel Jajolet de la Courbe, Premier voyage du sieur de La Courbe fait à la coste d'Afrique en 1685

Singer and ardin player Dimi Mint Abba became renowned throughout the Muslim world after winning the 1977 Umm Kulthum song contest held in Tunis. In modern times, instruments like the ardin and the tidinit lute are increasingly supplemented or replaced by the electric guitar.
