= Aynur Doğan =

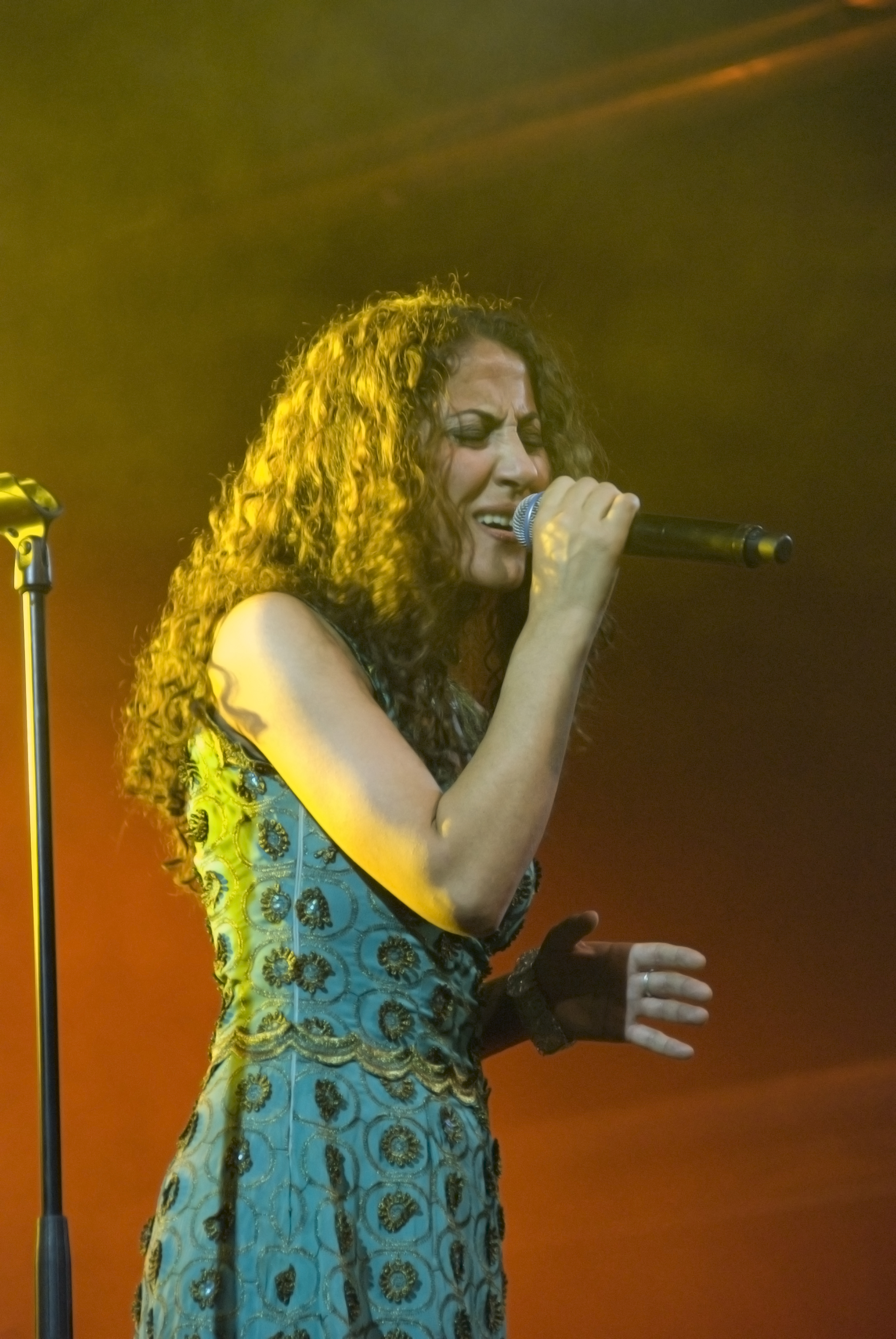
- Aynur Dogan on stage

Background information
- Born: 1 March 1975 (age 51)
- Origin: Çemişgezek, Turkey
- Genres: Kurdish folk, Turkish folk
- Occupations: Musician, songwriter
- Instrument: Vocals
- Years active: 2002–present
- Labels: Kalan Müzik, Sony Music, Harmonia Mundi
- Website: www.aynurdogan.net

Aynur Doğan (born 1 March 1975) is a contemporary Kurdish singer and musician from Turkey.

Aynur is a vocal artist who specializes in infusing traditional Kurdish folk music with a contemporary sensibility influenced by Western music. Her vocal style and success in the music world have allowed her to become a prominent representative of Kurdish people in Turkey and throughout the world. She has taken the wealth of Kurdish oral tradition, many of which are at least 300 years old, to the international stage.

Aynur has collaborated with numerous musicians, including Yo-Yo Ma and the Silk Road Ensemble, Kayhan Kalhor, Javier Limón, Kinan Azmeh, Mercan Dede, Cemil Qocgirı, Morgenland All Star Band, Quatour Voce, and the Netherlands Blazers Ensemble.

== Career ==
Aynur Doğan was born in Çemişgezek, a small mountain town in Tunceli Province in Turkey and fled to Istanbul in 1992. She studied saz and türkü singing in an influential music school in Istanbul, the Arif Sağ Müzik Okulu.

She gained great popularity after releasing the albums 'Keça Kurdan' in 2004 and 'Nûpel' in 2005, and also won the hearts of Turkish listeners with the Kurdish song she sang in Yavûz Turgûl's film Gönül Yarası (Kurdish: Birîna Dil), in which she had a small role as herself. She gained great attention in the international press with her performance in the documentary film Crossing the Bridge: The Sound of Istanbul (2005) by Fatih Akin.

In 2010, Aynur released her album Rewend on the Sony Music label and shot a video clip for the song Rewend in Hasankeyf with famous director Fatih Akin.

In July 2011, she was invited to perform for IKSV Jazz Festival, however her performance was cut short after the first song when a group in the audience started protesting and shouted at her to sing in Turkish. Following repeated threats by anti-Kurdish Turkish nationalist groups, she relocated to Amsterdam, Netherlands in 2012.

In 2014, Aynur joined Yo-Yo Ma and the Silk Road Ensemble on a trip to Istanbul, and their performance was featured in Oscar-winning director Morgan Neville's documentary film The Music of the Strangers. In 2015, she performed with Yo-Yo Ma at the film's premiere at the Toronto International Film Festival.

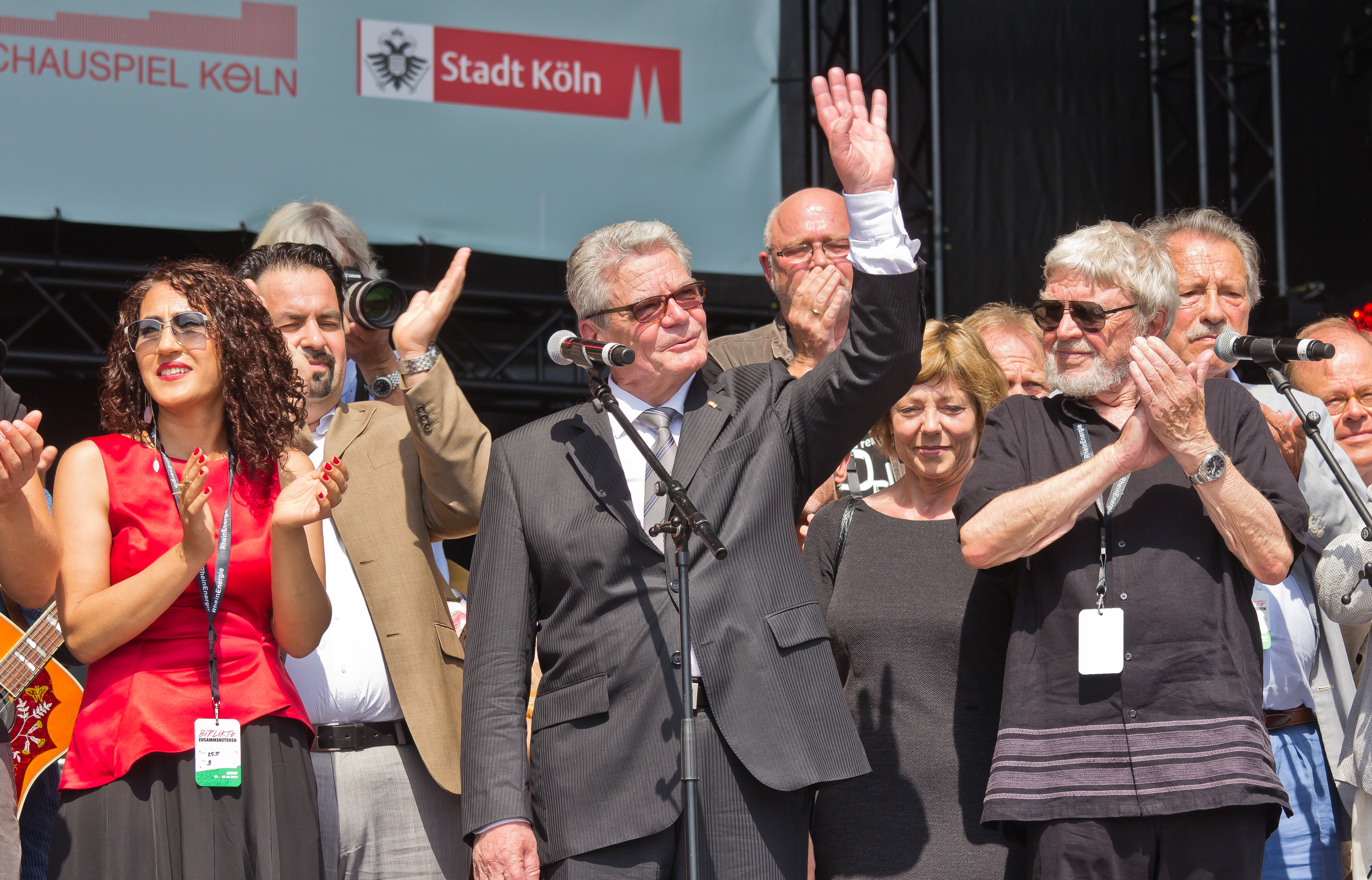
Aynur Doğan (left in red shirt) during Birlikte (2014). Joachim Gauck, president of Germany (centre) and Hardy Krüger (right, dark glasses).

== Awards And Recognition ==
In March 2017, Aynur was recognized by the prestigious American music school Berklee College of Music as the 2017 Master of Kurdish Music. Given her dedication to Kurdish folk music and her ability to successfully overcome obstacles in her artistic career, Aynur stands as an important role model among other female artists. The award was presented to Aynur at the Berklee Performance Center on March 16, 2017, during the Women of Kurdish Music Awards.

== Albums ==
- Rabe, 2024
- Hêdur, 2020,
- Hevra, Sony Music Classical, 2013,
- Rewend, Sony Music, 2010
- Nûpel, Kalan Music, 2005
- Keçe Kurdan, Kalan Music, 2004
- Seyir, 2002

=== Albums on which she has been featured ===
- Hawniyaz, (2016)
- Güldünya Şarkıları, (2008)
- Zülfü Livaneli Bir Kuşaktan Bir Kuşağa, Dağlara Küstüm Ali (2016)
- Kardeş Türküler, Bahar (2005)
- Mercan Dede, Nefes (Breath), (2006)
- Orient Expressions, Divan, (2004)
- Nederland Blazer Ensemble, Turqoıse (2006)
- Mor ve Ötesi, Mermiler (2012)
- A. Rıza - Hüseyin Albayrak, Böyle Buyurdu Aşık (2013), Şah Hatayi Deyişleri (2005)
- Metin Kemal Kahraman, Ferfecir, (1999), Sürella, (2000)
- Lütfü Gültekin, Gül Türküleri (2003), Derman Bizdedir, (1999)
- Grup Yorum, Yürüyüş, (2003)
- Javier Limón, Mujeres De Agua, (2010)
