= Silent City (disambiguation) =

Silent City is the nickname for the Maltese city of Mdina.

Silent City may also refer to:

- Silent City, a 2012 film by Threes Anna
- Silent City (album), a 2008 album by Brooklyn Rider
- The Silent City, a 2007 EP by Hope Lies Within
- The Silent City, a 1981 novel by Élisabeth Vonarburg
