= Kula Kulluk Yakişir Mi =

Live album by Kayhan Kalhor and Erdal Erzincan
- Released: 27 August 2013
- Recorded: February 2011, Bursa, Turkey
- Genre: Middle Eastern; Turkish classical Persian classical
- Length: 59:50
- Label: ECM

Professional ratings
Review scores
Source	Rating
Allmusic	4.5/5 stars
Financial Times	4/5 stars

Kula Kulluk Yakişir Mi is a live album by Turkish Musician Erdal Erzincan and Iranian Kamancheh player Kayhan Kalhor, released through ECM Records on 27 August 2013 in the United States.

The album was recorded live in Bursa, Turkey, in February 2011.

The album title, from the folk song of the same name by Turkish baglama player Muhlis Akarsu and translates as "How unseemly it is to follow anyone slavishly".

album included a new version of "The Wind" from their previous album and finale of "Intertwining Melodies" from both Persian and Turkish traditions.

== Track listing ==
1. "Improvisation I" – 5:29
2. "Allı Turnam" – 5:43
3. "Improvisation II" – 3:23
4. "Deli Derviş" – 4:11
5. "Daldalan Barı" – 6:18
6. "Improvisation III" – 3:00
7. "Kula Kulluk Yakışır Mı" – 8:57
8. "Improvisation IV" – 3:45
9. "Improvisation V" – 2:14
10. "The Wind" – 7:31
11. "Intertwining Melodies" – 9:19

- "Sivas Halayı"
- "Mevlam Birçok Dert Vermiş"
- "Erik Dalı Gevrektir"
- "Gol Nishan"
