= Schwartz Center =

The Schwartz Center may refer to:

- the Donna and Marvin Schwartz Center for Performing Arts at Emory University
- the Joe and Barbara Schwartz Center, an arena in Wilmington, North Carolina
- the Schwartz Center for Compassionate Healthcare, a healthcare-related nonprofit associated with MGH
- the Schwartz Center for the Performing Arts at Cornell University
- the Schwartz Center for the Arts at Dover University
