= Brooklyn Rider =

American string quartet

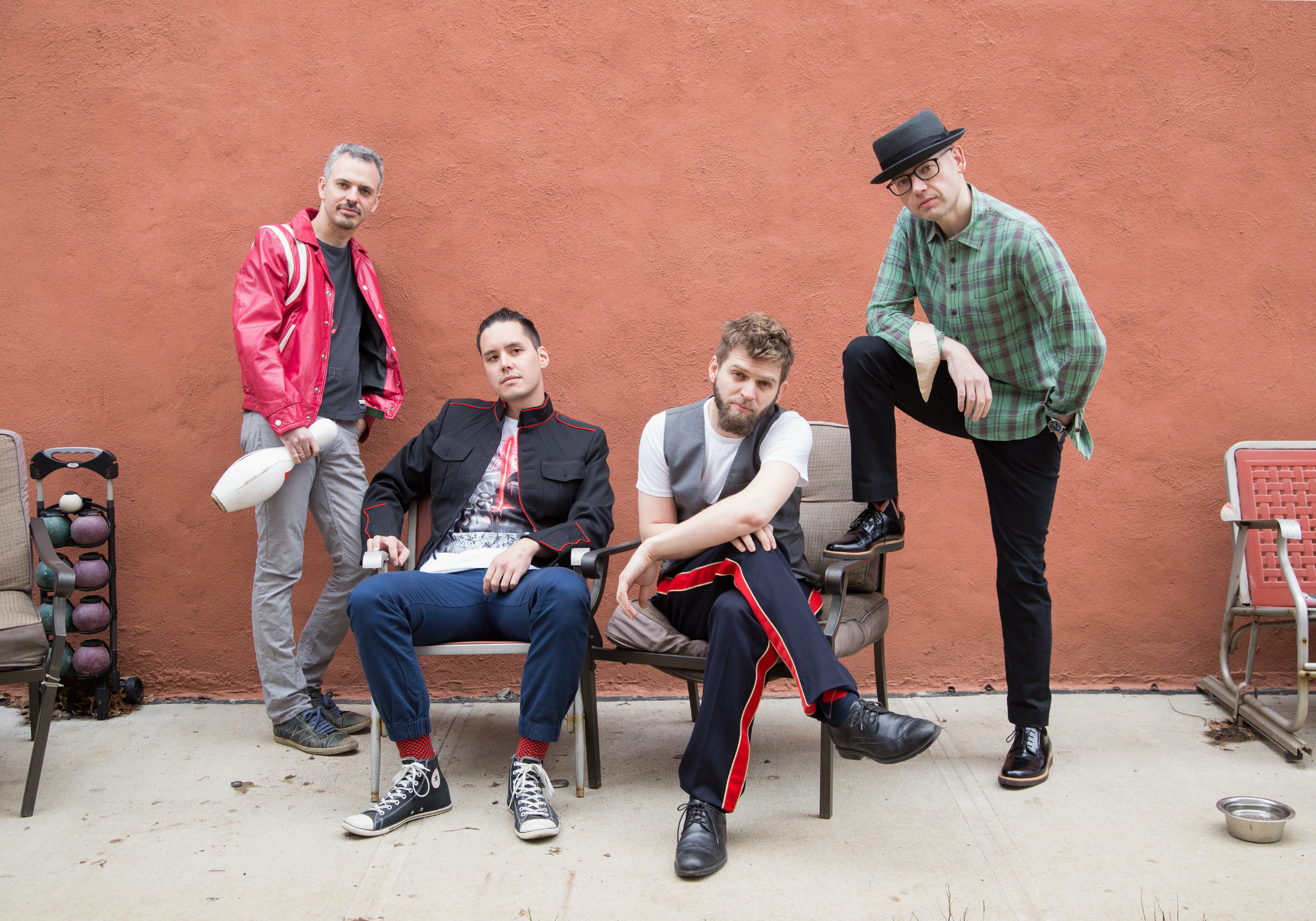
- Brooklyn Rider

Background information
- Origin: Brooklyn, New York City, United States
- Genre: Classical
- Occupation: String quartet
- Instruments: 2 violins, 1 viola, 1 cello
- Members: Johnny Gandelsman; Colin Jacobsen; Nicholas Cords; Michael Nicolas
- Past members: Eric Jacobsen
- Website: www.brooklynrider.com

Brooklyn Rider is an American string quartet, based in Brooklyn, New York City, United States, whose members include violinists Johnny Gandelsman and Colin Jacobsen, violist Nicholas Cords and cellist Michael Nicolas. They are mainly known for playing unusual and contemporary repertoire, and for collaborating with musicians from outside the classical music sphere. The quartet has founded the Stillwater Music Festival in 2006 to serve as a place to unveil new repertory and collaborations; the festival's last concerts were held in 2015. Brooklyn Rider also spends time teaching, including past residencies at Denison University, Dartmouth College, Williams College, MacPhail Center for Music, Texas A&M University and University of North Carolina.

Past performances have included evenings at the Schwartz Center (Atlanta, Georgia), the Kimmel Center, the Cologne Philharmonie, American Academy in Rome, Spoleto Festival USA, and Malmö Festival in Sweden. In 2010, the quartet was invited to play at the SXSW Festival in Austin, Texas, which was also broadcast live on NPR. They are the only classical performers to have been invited to play at the festival to date. Brooklyn Rider made their Lincoln Center and Carnegie Hall debuts in 2011.

In 2016, cellist Michael Nicolas replaced Eric Jacobsen in the ensemble.

== Recordings ==
Brooklyn Rider's first album, Passport, released in 2008, was selected by NPR as one of their best classical albums of that year. 2008 also saw the release a collaborative album with kamancheh player Kayhan Kalhor titled Silent City. They released Dominant Curve in 2010, which was featured on All Songs Considered and named in NPR's best music of 2010 so far list.

Brooklyn Rider was chosen by American composer Philip Glass to record his complete string quartets in 2011, which also included the world premiere recording of his Bent Suite. Their 2012 album, Seven Steps, was named to NPR's listener's choice best of 2012 so far list. In 2017, they released a disc of Glass' sixth and seventh quartets, along with an arrangement of his Saxophone Quartet for violin, two violas and cello.

In spring 2013 the ensemble announced a new recording partnership with Universal's Mercury Classics label. The first album, A Walking Fire, was released in the US on CD and iTunes on April 30 that year.

On August 13, 2013, banjo player Béla Fleck released a CD called The Impostor on the Deutsche Grammophon / Mercury Classics label (AMG Classical ID W 303049) which includes the title piece as a concerto for banjo and symphony orchestra, followed by a piece entitled "Night Flight Over Water", a composition for banjo and string quartet featuring Brooklyn Rider.

In 2015, the group celebrated its tenth anniversary with the groundbreaking multi-disciplinary project The Brooklyn Rider Almanac, for which it recorded and toured 15 specially commissioned works, each inspired by a different artistic muse.

In September 2016, Brooklyn Rider released So Many Things with Anne Sofie von Otter, featuring music by Kate Bush, John Adams, Caroline Shaw, Björk, Nico Muhly, Anders Hillborg, Brad Mehldau, Elvis Costello, Sting, Rufus Wainwright.

In October 2017, the group released Spontaneous Symbols which features music written for the quartet over the previous five years. Composers include Tyondai Braxton, Evan Ziporyn, Paula Matthusen, Kyle Sanna and a piece by Brooklyn Rider's very own Colin Jacobsen.

== Discography ==
- Passport (2008)
- Silent City with Kayhan Kalhor (2008)
- Dominant Curve (2010)
- Brooklyn Rider Plays Philip Glass (2011)
- Seven Steps (2012)
- The Impostor with Béla Fleck (2013)
- A Walking Fire (2013)
- The Brooklyn Rider Almanac (2014)
- The Fiction Issue (2016)
- So Many Things with Anne Sofie Von Otter (2016)
- Spontaneous Symbols (2017)
- Philip Glass: String Quartets Nos. 6 & 7, Saxophone Quartet (2017)
- Annunciation with Philip Glass (2019)
- Sun on Sand with Joshua Redman (2019)
- The Butterfly with Martin Hayes (2019)
- Healing Modes (2020)
- The Four Elements (2025)
