= Françoise Atlan =

French musical artist

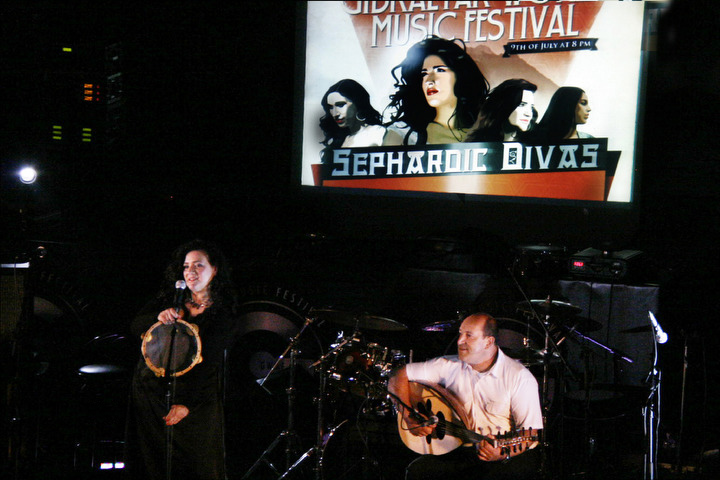

Background information
- Born: 27 July 1964 (age 62); Narbonne, France
- Origin: France
- Genres: Andalusian, sephardic
- Occupation: Singer
- Years active: 1987 –present

Françoise Atlan (פרנסואז אטלן in Hebrew, فرنسواز أطلان in Arabic) is a French singer and ethnomusicologist, born in a Sephardic Jewish family in Narbonne, France on 27 July 1964. Her father was a lawyer and native of Béjaïa, Algeria, and her mother was a pianist and a lyrical singer.

on 30 March, she was one of three performers who sang Muslim, Christian and Jewish religious songs in unison accompanied by the Moroccan Philharmonic Orchestra during Pope Francis visit to the Shereefian Kingdom. In July 2018, She acquired Moroccan citizenship by royal decree published in the Moroccan official bulletin of 2 May.

== Musical education ==
Atlan started to learn piano with her mother at the age of six. In 1984, she finished her musical education at the Saint-Étienne and Aix-en-Provence conservatories, obtaining a degree in piano (gold medal) and chamber (silver medal). Later, she learned musicology at Aix-Marseille University where she passed the Agrégation competitive examination for teachers. She worked at the same time with vocal techniques at the Paris Opera school with Andréa Guiot.

== Career ==
Endowed with a natural voice developed in her early years, she sings "nawbas" which are usually reserved for male singers. She sings equally with the flamenco guitarist Juan Carmona or medieval European repertoire with the Ensemble Gilles Binchois or with the Boston Camerata . Welcomed with equal enthusiasm in Morocco (Fes, Rabat, Casablanca in 1994), in Switzerland (Montreux, Yverdon-les-Bains in 1993) and in France (Abbaye du Thoronet in 1993 for the Chants Sacrés de la Méditerranée, and in Arsenal de Metz for the Festival Transméditerranéen in 1994), and receiving warm applauses in Belgrade, Tokyo and Kyoto, she took part in the recording of the album Borboréo by the guitarist Juan Carmona. She achieved success in the US, Japan, Spain, Portugal, Italy, Great Britain, Morocco, Tunisia, ex-Yugoslavia, Israel, and continued her research on Mediterranean repertoires, and in the ancient occidental or in the traditional Andalusian Arabic repertoires. Nowadays, Françoise Atlan chooses to live and work in Morocco, particularly in Marrakesh .

== Early years ==
As a member of the Choeur contemporain conducted by Roland Hayrabedian, Atlan distinguished herself in the vocal music of the composer Maurice Ohana, who entrusted her with the soloist part of his Cantigas, the recording of which obtained the French "Grand Prix de l'Académie Charles Cros du disque" (1987). From 1987 to 1989, she was featured as first soloist in the vocal ensemble "Musicatreize", which specialised in contemporary music (Ohana, Ligeti, Nono).

Her debut album Romances Sefardies recorded in 1992 was met with critical acclaim. Her second CD entitled Entre la Rose et le Jasmin received the "Diapason d'Or" conferred by Diapason, a French classical music magazine in 1994. She sings either Sephardic romances from the North Africa and Andalusia Jewish communities in ladino, or the troubadour old laments in Occitan, even Andalusian Arabic melodies in Arabic.

Her work from 1990 to 1998 as a singer of the group Aksak, which played a repertoire of Turkish, Greek and Armenian songs, provided the opportunity to work in both Arab-Andalusian repertoire (with Mahmoud Guettat and Toufik Bestandij) and Judeo-Arab (with Cheikh Zekri) repertoire

She is a Sephardic romance performer who shows respect for the established traditions of the genre. Her Jewish roots led Atlan to develop a passion for traditional music, and particularly music from the Mediterranean Basin. In the traditional singing approach, style remains her main consideration, less than mechanical effect repetition. Style is still the core of her musical work. Her knowledge of Andalusian tradition has enabled her to develop an expressive style which combines vocal technique and Sephardic sensibility.

Her interpretation reveals the influences of the Jewish Spanish communities. The musical styles of Arabic, Muslim and Jewish communities historically were coloured with mutual influences intensifying their cohabitation. In an Andalusian orchestra, those communities played side by side, so that only lyrics distinguished each group's origin.

In 2001, Atlan was involved in the creation of the composer Florence Baschet work, Femmes, a commission from Radio France, with the participation of the Ensemble Fa under the direction of Dominique My. That same year, accompanied by the Armenian Ensemble Goussan, she offered a program of classical and traditional Armenian Music (5th to 19th century) at the Festival d'Ambronay.

Since 2003, Atlan has performed on stages in the USA (Carnegie Hall, New York City), Japan, Canada, the Netherlands, Belgium, Norway, Israel, Italy, Spain, Corsica, Tunisia, Morocco, Algeria, Switzerland, Great-Britain, Germany, and Mexico, among others.

== Transition to Andalusian music ==
In October 2007, she introduced at the French Institute in Marrakesh the show "Andalussyiat, l'esprit de Grenade" (Andalusia, the spirit of Granada) where accompanying by Youssef Kassimi Jamal to the oud and Abdelmounaïm Jairi to the drums, she conveyed listeners in subtle poetic and musical travel through the three monotheist Andalusia: Jew, Christian and Muslim.

Since then, she has played in numerous countries and collaborated with various artists, included the flamenco guitarist Juan Carmona, the Chemiranis Brothers, Bahaâ Ronda, Cinco Siglos, Fadia Tomb El-Hage, Neta Elkayam and Patrizia Bovi, appearing in concerts showcasing the medieval interactions between cultures in the Mediterranean Basin.

She has been one of the directors of the Atlantic Festival of Andalusian Music in Essaouira, Morocco, devoted to Jewish and Muslim religious chants from Al-Andalus.

== Conservatory ==
Since 1998, she has been giving master classes in France (Centre de musique médiévale de Paris), in Switzerland: Geneva (Ateliers d'Ethnomusicologie) and Basel (Schola Cantorum) and in Morocco (Académie de Rabat) on a regular basis. As teacher, she gives lessons within the framework of dance and world music training course "La croisée des chemins", usually organized in July by "Ateliers d'Ethnomusicologie" Geneva.

== Awards ==
- 1987: Grand Prix Académie Charles Cros for her performance of the Cantigas of Maurice Ohana with the contemporary music ensemble Musicatreize.
- 1994: Diapason d'Or of the French music magazine of the same name for her album Entre la Rose et le Jasmin.
- 1998: "Prix Villa Médicis Hors les Murs", conferred by the French Ministry of Culture to French artists. The award included a grant which enabled her to work for three years on the Arab-Andalusian repertoire of the Fez tradition, alongside Mohamed Briouel. Together, they recorded Nawba M'Cherqi, which includes a selection of Arab-Andalusian songs.
- 2007: Groupe Caisse d'Épargne award «Meilleure Artiste Chant du Monde».

== Discography ==
- Romances Sefardies Buda Records 92529-2 1992
- Nawah 2003
- Andalussyat 2003
- Terres Turquoises Constantinople (ensemble) Kiya Tabassian, Françoise Atlan Atma Classique ACD 2 2314 2004
- Ay!! Amor... Constantinople, Françoise Atlan Atma Classique ACD2 2594 2008
- Premiers Songes – Early Dreams – on poems of Sor Juana Inés de la Cruz, Constantinople, Françoise Atlan, Analekta AN 2 9989 2011
- Aman! Sefarad... Buda Musique, 2014
