= Ali Akbar Moradi =

Ali Akbar Moradi Persian: علی‌اکبر مرادی Sorani Kurdish: عەلی ئەکبەر مورادی
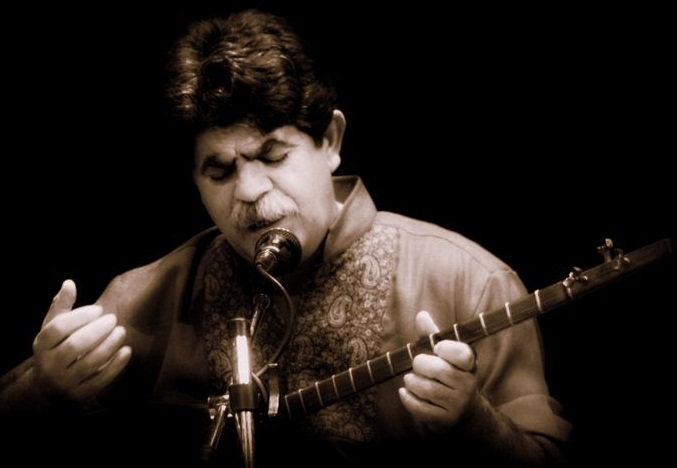

Background information
- Born: 1957 (age 68–69); Gahvareh, Kermanshah province, Iran
- Occupations: Musician, composer
- Instrument: Tanbur

Ali Akbar Moradi (Persian: علی‌اکبر مرادی, Sorani Kurdish: عەلی ئەکبەر مورادی, Kurdish: Elî Ekber Muradî; born 1957) is an Iranian Kurdish musician and composer. He was born in Gahvareh in Kermanshah province of Iran. He started music at a very early age, and learned the Kurdish maqam repertoire and tanbur (Kurdish lute) under the supervision of Kurdish masters such as Mirza Sayyed Ali Kafashyan, Kaki Allah Morad Hamidi and Sayyed Vali Hosseyni. He gave his first recital in 1971 in Kermanshah. In 1981, he began collaborating with the Kurdish singer Shahram Nazeri, and performed throughout Europe and North America. He is an expert on the tanbur instrument, which is considered sacred in Kurdish Yarsani and sufi music.

He has performed music in New York City, San Francisco and London. On 30 September 2006, he gave a special program as part of Voices of Kurdistan in San Francisco World Music Festival, he has been appointed as one of fifty of the best musicians around the globe by a British music magazine. Moradi has written a book about playing Kurdish tabur, which includes most well-known maqams of tanbur.

== Works ==
- Fire of Passion, Kurdish Tanbur Music of Iran, 1999.
- Kurdaneh, 2001.
- Whisper, 2001.
- Kurdish Music from Iran, 2002.
- In The Mirror of the Sky, with Kayhan Kalhor, 2004.

== Music festivals ==
- Montana Folk Festival, Butte, MT, 2014.
- San Francisco World Music Festival, 2006.
- Rhythm Sticks Festival, London, 2004
- Broadway Theater, New York, 2004.
- UC Irvine, California, 2004,
- Queen Elizabeth Hall, London, 2000.
