= Salman Gambarov =

Azerbaijani pianist and composer (born 1959)

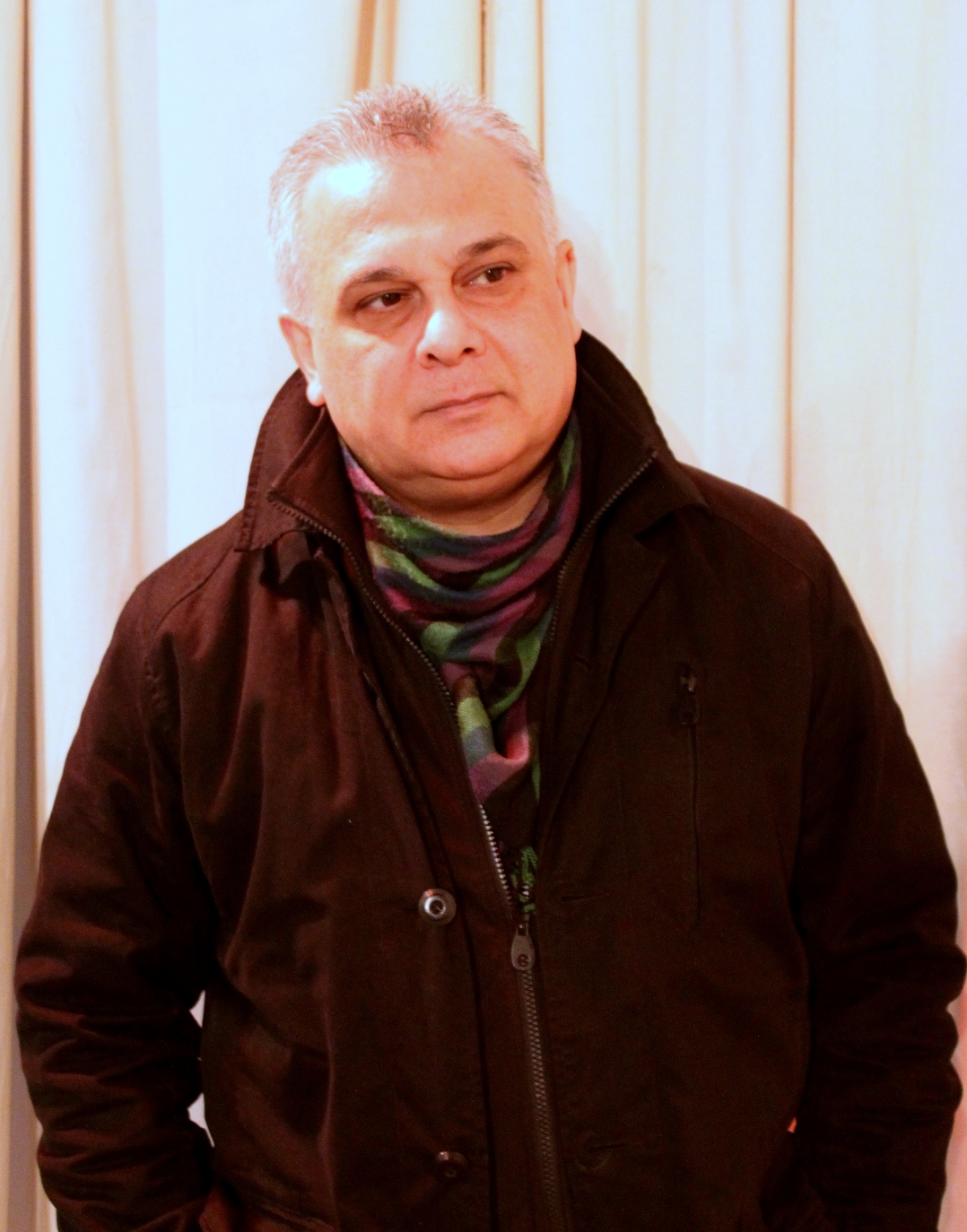

Background information
- Born: Salman Huseyn oglu Gambarov; 18 April 1959 (age 67); Baku, Azerbaijan SSR, Soviet Union
- Genres: Ethno-jazz, contemporary jazz, fusion, post-bop
- Occupations: Musician, composer, musicologist
- Years active: 1990s–present

Salman Huseyn oglu Gambarov (Azerbaijani: Salman Hüseyn oğlu Qəmbərov; born 18 April 1959, in Baku) is an Azerbaijani jazz pianist and composer.

== Biography ==
Salman Huseyn oglu Gambarov is a jazz musician, theorist-musicologist and jazz composer.

His mother Sura Gambarova, daughter of Huseynagha Hajibababeyov, an opera singer, imparted him love to music from his early ages. At the age of four, Salman played grand piano and picked up the most difficult compositions. Later, studying at a secondary specialized musical school named after Bulbul, Salman amazed people with his no ordinary play and a special approach to music.

Student years formed his musical thinking, determined his style and skills, and also revealed his main creative cue – foothold in academic, national and avant-garde musical art. As a pianist he continued his education at Azerbaijan State Conservatoire named after Uzeyir Hajibeyov, from where he graduated as a theorist-musicologist (1978-1983) and as a composer (1986-1990, class of professor I.Hajibeyov). Being a student, Salman learned jazz seriously by himself. According to his words: "jazz is music which compares everything in itself." Understanding necessity of jazz education, Salman began actively perfect skills in different styles and manners of jazz.

After education in composer faculty he could deeply synthesize acquired information with creative search. Salman Gambarov's first composition called "Variations for fortepiano" was conferred the first premium in the All-Union contest of composers in 1987, in Moscow.

In 1996, Salman founded a group called "Bakustic Jazz", the membership of which varies depending on aims and projects. "Bakustic Jazz" appeared in different hypostasis: firstly a mainstream and cool based on the best traditions, post-bop (of such masters as Evans, Keith Jarrett, Hancock, Rubalcaba and others) in performance of habitual combo (not rarely with vocal of Estrada musicians); then it was followed by a turn to fusion, modal jazz (participating together with Jamil Amirov and A.Bayramova at "Oriental Jazz Fest" in Germany, in 1999). Such famous musicians as Sevda Alakbarzadeh, Anar Taghizade, Farida Mammadova in projects of "Bakustic Jazz". "Bakustic Jazz" performed in jazz clubs of Baku, Odesa, Tbilisi, Warsaw, Berlin, Chicago, Basel and Moscow and also participated at gala concerts together with musicians from Russia, the Netherlands, Germany, France, England and the United States. "Bakustic Jazz" participated at different by profile festivals in Azerbaijan and far from its boundaries, such as "GIFT-Tbilisi" (Georgia), "Oriental Jazz Fest" (Germany), “Transsib Inter Jazz” (Novosibirsk, Russia), "Art of improvisation" (Odesa, Ukraine), "Restoration of disturbed connections" (Ulaanbaatar, Mongolia), "New music of last century", "Festival of modern music" (Baku, Azerbaijan), "Jazz carnival" (Odesa), "Improvised marry-go-round" (Ukraine), "Caspian Jazz and Blues Festival" (Baku, Azerbaijan), "Baku International Jazz Festival" (Azerbaijan), "Moscow Festival named after Vagif Mustafazadeh" (Russia), "Zelt-Musik-Festival" (Freiburg, Germany), "Astana Blues" (Kazakhstan), "Montreux Jazz Festival" (Switzerland), "Kaunas Jazz" (Lithuania), "Beethoven Fest" (Bonn, Germany), "Culturescapes" (Switzerland) and "The Caucasian Polyphony" (Sochi, Russia).

Salman Gambarov is a creative person without habitual frames. His jazz is colorful and fine. It is interesting for many, but not understandable for everybody, because Salman does not play in public for applause. His aspiration for folk jazz is revealed in a soundtrack written by film to a silent film "Latif" and also in a "East or West?" project music to which was written in a London studio called "The Premises, in 2000.

== Creativity ==
=== Discography ===
- East or West? album by Salman Gambarov and Anar Taghizade
- StandArts Dialogue album by Salman Gambarov and Werner Englert
- Lieder Leaders DVD by Salman Gambarov and Farida Mammadova

== Participation at festivals ==
- 1998 - GIFT Festival - (Tbilisi, Georgia)
- 1999 - Oriental Jazz Fest - (Germany)
- 1999 - Transsib Inter Jazz - (Novosibirsk, Russia)
- 2001 - Art of Improvisation - (Odesa, Ukraine)
- 2001 - Transcaucasia: Reconstruction of broken contacts - (Ulaanbaatar, Mongolia)
- 2001 - New music from the last century - Festival of Modern Music - (Baku, Azerbaijan)
- 2002 - Caspian Jazz and Blues Festival - (Baku, Azerbaijan)
- 2003 - 21. Zelt-Musik-Festival - (Freiburg, Germany)
- 2006 - Astana Blues - II International Festival of Jazz Music - (Astana, Kazakhstan)
- 2007 - Montreux Jazz Festival - (Switzerland)
- 2008 - Kaunas Jazz Festival - (Lithuania)
- 2008 - Beethovenfest - (Bonn, Germany)
- 2009 - Morgenland Festival Osnabrück - (Germany)
- 2009 - Montreux Jazz Festival - (Switzerland)

== Projects ==
- Solo-piano
- Duet with soprano of Farida Mammadova (Music of Schubert, Brahms and Mahler in jazz variation)
- Duet with tenor-saxophone of Werner Englert (Germany)
- “Latif” project: a silent film with improvised soundtrack (grand piano – Salman Gambarov, kamancha – Fakhraddin Dadashov, naghara, percussion – Eldar Gafarov)
- Classic jazz-trio: grand piano – Salman Gambarov, contrabass – Ruslan Huseynov, percussion – Vagif Aliyev
- Trio with Vasumathi Badrinathan – an Indian vocalist and with Amir Elsafar – an Arabian musician living in the USA
- Hawniyaz album, released in 2016
