= Night, Silence, Desert =

Night, Silence, Desert شب، سکوت، کویر

Studio album by Kayhan Kalhor, Mohammad Reza Shajarian
- Released: 12 September 2000
- Genre: World music, Persian traditional music
- Length: 62:36
- Label: Traditional Crossroads

Professional ratings
Review scores
Source	Rating
Allmusic	4.5/5 stars

Night, Silence, Desert (Persian: شب، سکوت، کویر) is a collaborative album by Iranian musician Kayhan Kalhor with Mohammad Reza Shajarian and others, released on 12 September 2000 in the United States through Traditional Crossroads records.

== Track listing ==
All music is composed by Kayhan Kalhor

No.	Title	Length
1.	"Silence of the Night (Sokout-e Shab)"	3:54
2.	"Desert (Kavir)"	6:14
3.	"Instrument & Vocal (Saz va Avaz)"	8:28
4.	"Desert Night (Shab-e-Kavir)"	2:14
5.	"Rain (Baroun)"	9:35
6.	"Festive Occasion (Sharang)"	6:51
7.	"Dotar Instrumental (Hajigholagh)"	2:10
8.	"Setar Instrumental (Torgheh)"	6:18
9.	"Instrument & Vocal (Saz va Avaz)"	10:46
10.	"Lover's Plight (Ey Asheghan)"	6:06
Total length:		62:36

== Personnel ==
- Kayhan Kalhor – Kamancheh
- Mohammad Reza Shajarian – Vocals
- Ardavan Kamkar – Santur
- Bijan Kamkar – Daf
- Behzad Farhoudi – Ney
- Hossein Behroozinia – Barbat
- Haj Ghorban Soleimani – Dotar
