= Joseph Gramley =

American composer and percussionist

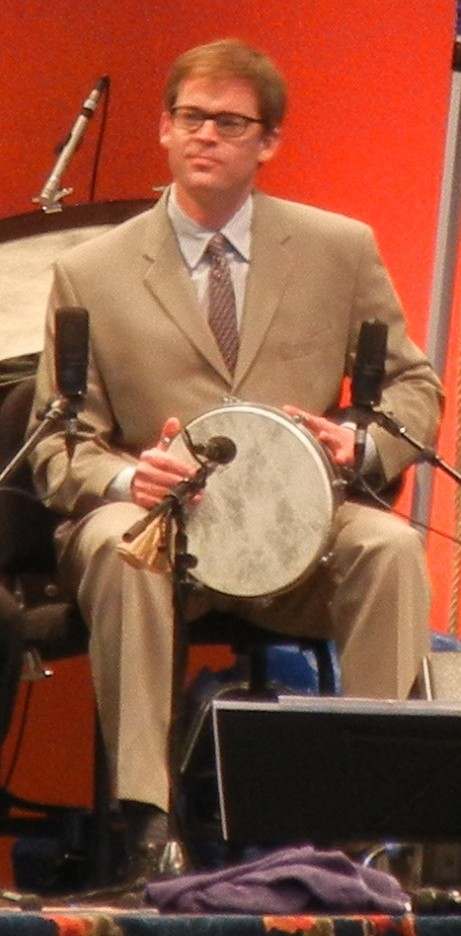
Joseph Gramley performing with the Silk Road Ensemble, June 2011

Joseph Gramley is an American multi-percussionist, teacher and composer, and a founding member of the Silk Road Ensemble. As a solo performer he each year commissions and premieres new works from such emerging composers as Kojiro Umezaki and Justin Messina. His first solo recording, American Deconstruction, featuring performances of five milestone works in multi-percussion's modern repertoire, appeared in 2000 and was reissued in 2006. His second CD, Global Percussion, was released in 2005.

== Education and early career ==
Gramley grew up in Oregon and was named a Presidential Scholar in the Arts while at senior at the Interlochen Arts Academy in 1988. He did his undergraduate work at the University of Michigan, where he was a student of Michael Udow and Salvatore Rabbio and was a recipient of the Albert A. Stanley Medal. He also attended the Tanglewood Institute and Salzburg Mozarteum. Gramley made his concerto debut in 1992 with the Houston Symphony Orchestra and music director Christoph Eschenbach after winning their National Soloist Competition. His solo debut followed in 1994 at Carnegie Hall’s Weill Recital Hall. He did his graduate studies at the Juilliard School in New York where he studied with Gordon Gottlieb and Daniel Druckman. Upon receiving his M. Mus., Gramley performed and recorded with the Ethos Percussion Group throughout the U. S. and Europe.

== Involvement with Silk Road Ensemble ==
In 2000, Gramley began working with Yo-Yo Ma as a founding member of the Silk Road Ensemble, which, as part of Mr. Ma's Silk Road Project, became one of the best-selling classical music groups in the world. In addition to participating in the group's extended residencies in American cities, Gramley has toured with the Ensemble throughout Europe and Asia. In the course of his involvement with the group, Gramley has studied percussion styles and instruments from around the globe, and collaborated with musicians from India, Iran, China, Japan, Korea and Central Asia. He has performed on six Silk Road albums on the Sony BMG label, as well as the group's Grammy-nominated CD with the Chicago Symphony Orchestra, Transitions and Transformations (CSO Resound, 2008). He also performed on Yo-Yo Ma's Grammy-winning Songs of Joy and Peace (Sony Classical, 2008). Gramley can be heard on the Silk Road's CDs Off the Map (World Village Classical, 2009), A Playlist Without Borders (Sony Classical, 2014) and thf GRAMMY-winning ‘Sing Me Home’ (Sony Classical 2016).

In October 2008, Gramley and Yo-Yo Ma jointly appeared as guest artists with the Nashville Symphony. Gramley served as Silkroad’s first chair of their artist-led ‘leadership council’ from 2012-2014 and served as Associate Artistic Director, working directly with Yo-Yo Ma from 2015-2017.

== Guest artist, festival and chamber work ==
In addition to his solo and Silk Road work, as well as his frequent appearances with chamber groups and orchestras, Gramley performs with the British organist Clive Driskill-Smith in the duo Organized Rhythm. The pair's first recording, Beaming Music, was issued in 2008.

Gramley has performed with the Metropolitan Opera (on stage in Tan Dun with Plácido Domingo), and accompanied Pierre-Laurent Aimard on his 2007 United States tour. He has performed with the Orpheus Chamber Orchestra and the Orchestra of St. Luke's as well as The Knights. Festival appearances include Tanglewood, Marlboro, Spoleto and Caramoor. He has also performed with orchestras for the Broadway productions of Miss Saigon, Jekyll & Hyde, Phantom of the Opera, and The Color Purple, and has accompanied Elton John at Radio City Music Hall.

== Teaching and composition ==
Joseph Gramley is a Professor of Music (Percussion) and Chair at Indiana University Jacobs School of Music. He began this post in August 2019.

Gramley directed the percussion program at the University of Michigan from 2007-2019, and directed the Juilliard Summer Percussion Seminar, which he took over in 2000, until 2016 when Samuel Solomon became the Artistic Director. It is an intensive program for high-school students held annually at Lincoln Center in New York City. Gramley regularly appears as a guest artist and speaker at schools and conservatories worldwide. Gramley's own compositions have been performed at the Art Institute of Chicago, Dallas' Meyerson Symphony Center Concert Hall and San Francisco's Davies Symphony Hall.

== Discography ==
=== Solo ===
American Deconstruction (2000) Reissued 2006 (7-00261-20812-1). Global Percussion (2005) Towerhill (6-64457-20032-3).

=== With Organized Rhythm ===
Beaming Music (2008), Equilibrium (7-94055-00892-9).

=== With the Silk Road Ensemble ===
When Strangers Meet (2002)Sony Classical (ASIN: B0000641CG) Beyond the Horizon (2004), Sony Classical (8-2796-93962-2) New Impossibilities (2007), Sony Classical (8-8697-10319-2) Off the Map (2009), World Village Music. (7-13746-80952-2) A Playlist Without Borders (2014) live From Tanglewood (2015) Sony Classical. Sing Me Home (2016) Sony Classical.

=== With Yo-Yo Ma ===
Songs of Joy & Peace (2008), Sony Classical (ASIN: B001BN1V82). Viva Brazil, Sony Classical 2014.
