= Crossing the Bridge: The Sound of Istanbul =

2005 Turkish documentary film

- Directed by: Fatih Akın
- Written by: Fatih Akın
- Produced by: Fatih Akın
- Starring: Alexander Hacke, Baba Zula, Aynur Doğan
- Distributed by: Bavaria Film
- Release date: 9 June 2005 (Germany)
- Running time: 90 minutes
- Countries: Turkey; Germany
- Languages: Turkish; German
- Box office: $704,094

Crossing the Bridge: The Sound of Istanbul is a 2005 documentary film directed by Fatih Akın. The film is a journey through the music scene in modern Istanbul, Turkey as well as portraying its cultural life. It was screened out of competition at the 2005 Cannes Film Festival.

It features German musician Alexander Hacke (member of Einstürzende Neubauten) as the narrator. Hacke and Akın travelled around Istanbul with a mobile recording studio and a microphone, assembling an inspired portrait of Turkish music — from classical music to indie rock and rap.

Among the featured artists in the film are (in order of appearance):

- Baba Zula
- Orient Expressions
- Duman
- Replikas
- Erkin Koray
- Ceza
- Ayben
- Istanbul Style Breakers
- Mercan Dede
- Selcuk
- Brenna MacCrimmon
- Selim Sesler
- Siyasiyabend
- Nur Ceylan
- Aynur (i.e. Aynur Doğan)
- Orhan Gencebay
- Müzeyyen Senar
- Sezen Aksu
- Sertab Erener

== Soundtrack ==
1. "Music" - Sertab Erener (5:18)
2. "Tavus Havası" - Baba Zula (5:27)
3. "İstanbul 1:26 A.M." - Orient Expressions (6:36)
4. "İstanbul" - Duman (1:40)
5. "Şahar Dağı" - Replikas (7:08)
6. "Holocaust" - Ceza (3:28)
7. "AB-I Hayat" - Mercan Dede (3:47)
8. "Kürdili Hicazkar Longa" - Selim Sesler (4:58)
9. "Wedding Song" - The Wedding Sound System (2:04)
10. "Penceresi Yola Karşı" - Selim Sesler & Brenna MacCrimmon (2:54)
11. "Hayyam" - Siya Siyabend (2:49)
12. "Böyle Olur Mu" - Nur Ceylan (1:34)
13. "Ehmedo" - Aynur Doğan (5:26)
14. "Hatasız Kul Olmaz" - Orhan Gencebay (5:24)
15. "Haydar Haydar" - Müzeyyen Senar (1:19)
16. "İstanbul Hatırası" - Sezen Aksu (4:38)
17. "Cecom" - Baba Zula (4:35)
18. "Music (Radyo Versyonu)" - Sertab Erener (3:47)

== Reception ==
On review aggregator website Rotten Tomatoes, the film holds an approval rating of 89% based on 37 reviews, with an average rating of 7.0/10.
