= Hawniyaz =

2016 Kurdish music album

Hawniyaz ھاونیاز

Studio album by Kayhan Kalhor, Aynur Doğan, Cemil Qocgiri and Salman Gambarov
- Released: 2016
- Genre: Kurdish music
- Label: Harmonia Mundi

Hawniyaz (Sorani Kurdish: ھاونیاز) is an album of Kurdish music released in 2016. It was the result of a collaboration among Kayhan Kalhor, Aynur Doğan, Cemil Qocgiri, and Salman Gambarov. The album was released by Harmonia Mundi. It includes traditional Kurdish songs that are recreated with a new composition, which includes classical, folk and jazz elements.
