= Angel Lam (composer) =

Hong Kong composer

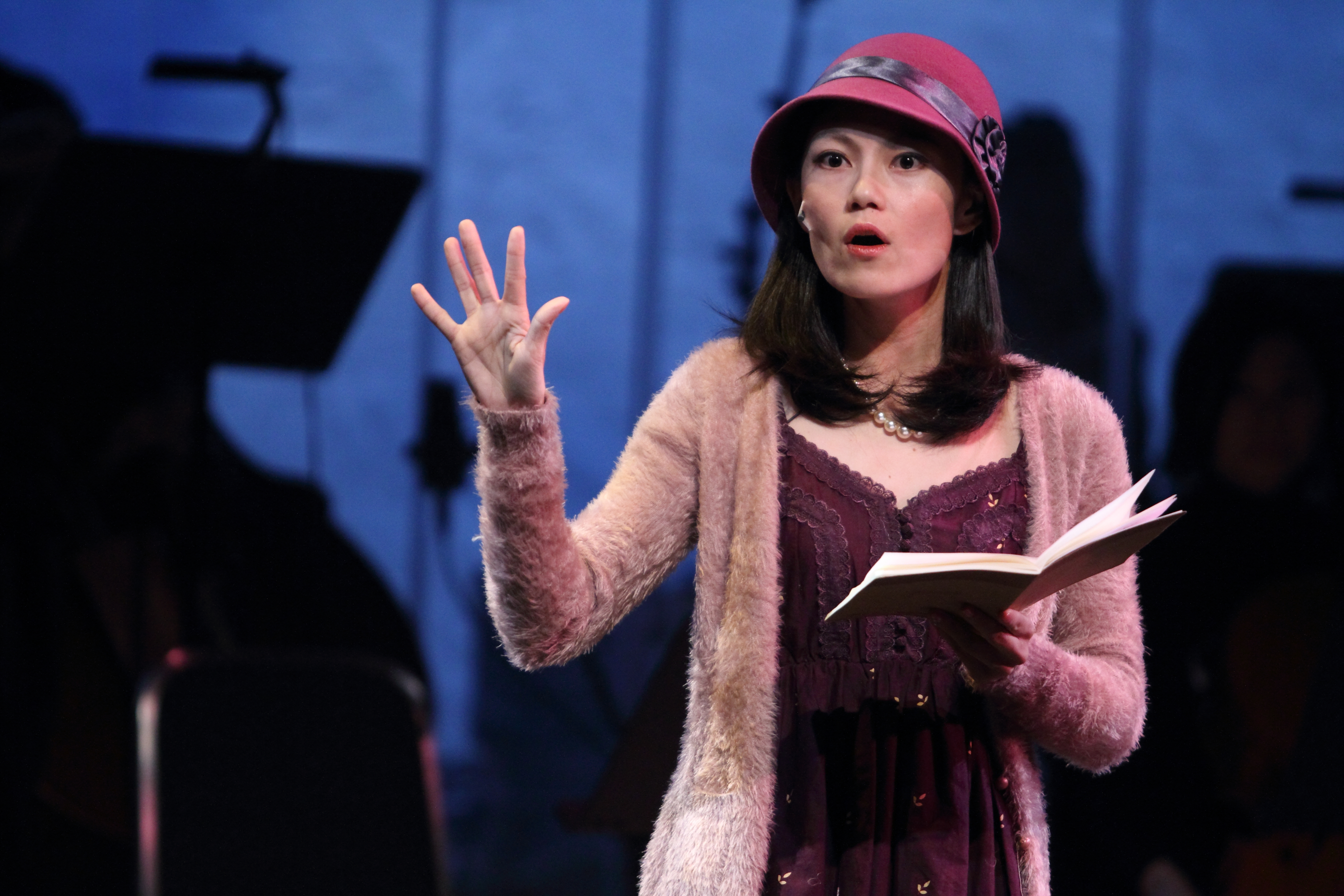
- Born: Hong Kong
- Occupations: Composer, writer
- Musical career
- Origin: California, United States and Hong Kong
- Genres: Classical, crossover, world music, folk, theater
- Instruments: Piano, voice narration
- Website: angellam.com

Angel Lam is a New York-based Hong Kong-born composer and writer. She has composed for artists and ensembles such as Yo-Yo Ma, Aldo Parisot, The Silk Road Ensemble, Atlanta Symphony, Minnesota Orchestra, Hong Kong Arts Festival, Aspen Music Festival and Pacific Music Festival, among others.

== Biography ==
Lam holds degrees from Yale University, the Peabody Conservatory of Johns Hopkins University, and Hong Kong Academy for Performing Arts. She first received a commission from Carnegie Hall's Weill Music Institute in 2006. The resulting piece she composed, "Empty Mountain, Spirit Rain," caught the attention of Yo-Yo Ma, artistic director of The Silk Road Ensemble. They took the piece on worldwide concert tours throughout the United States, Europe, Canada, Japan, South East Asia, and China, and recorded her piece on two CDs, "New Impossibilities" and "Off the Map". The latter album, in which Lam was one of four featured composers, was nominated for a GRAMMY in the Best Classical Crossover category.

For her second commission from Carnegie Hall, she created the song cycle "Sun, Moon, and Star" with mentorship from Osvaldo Golijov and Dawn Upshaw. In the same year, Lam was mentored by theater artist Martha Clarke to create her theater work "Midnight Run" for music, dance and visual projections in collaboration with the historic Peabody Dance in Baltimore. Since then she has created three large-scale dance works for Peabody Dance, Hong Kong Academy for Performing Arts, and Quad City Symphony in collaboration with New York's Nai-Ni Chen Dance. Other premieres of her works include Colorado Symphony Orchestra, Kansas City Symphony, Utah Symphony, Quad City Symphony, Jacksonville Symphony, Hong Kong Sinfonietta, Wisconsin Chamber Orchestra, South Bend Symphony, New York's Greenwich Village Orchestra, New York University Symphony Orchestra, Chicago's Northwest Symphony, Symphony of Oak Park and River Forest, University of California Irvine Symphony Orchestra, Norfolk Chamber Music Festival, Yale Philharmonia, Interlochen Arts Academy, Los Angeles Loyola Choir Men's Chorus and Orchestra, Orange County Women's Chorus, among others.

She is one of America’s foremost female composers selected by the League of American Orchestras and the Virginia B. Toulmin Foundation. Recently, she was commissioned to write three new orchestral works to be performed by ten professional North American orchestras.

Lam was voted "Artist of the Month" by the magazine Musical America, and by Yale Alumni Magazine as "Yalie of the Week". In the same year, she received a commission to compose "Awakening from a Disappearing Garden," a cello and orchestra work for Yo-Yo Ma and the Atlanta Symphony Orchestra. The composition premiered in New York at Carnegie Hall's China Festival "Ancient Paths, Modern Voices".

She was a featured New Stage Theater composer at the 40th Hong Kong Arts Festival. As composer, librettist, and story writer, she premiered her musical "June Lovers", featuring Atlanta Symphony Orchestra violinist and concertmaster David Coucheron and conductor Perry So, along with six singers and actors with an ensemble of eight musicians. Lam currently resides in New York City and also writes critical reviews for the Broadway, Off-Broadway, and indie shows review website Theasy.com. She is a member of Johns Hopkins University's Distinguished Artist Council and the Hong Kong Jockey Club Music and Dance Fund Awardees Association.

== External sources ==
- Gramophone review Off The Map
- The Decade the World Tilted East – Financial Times article
- Musical America Artist of the Month – Angel Lam
- Carnegie Hall Blog, Yo-Yo Ma Premiere in Ancient Paths, Modern Voices – Composer Angel Lam
