= Constantinople (ensemble) =

Early and middle eastern music ensemble based in Montreal

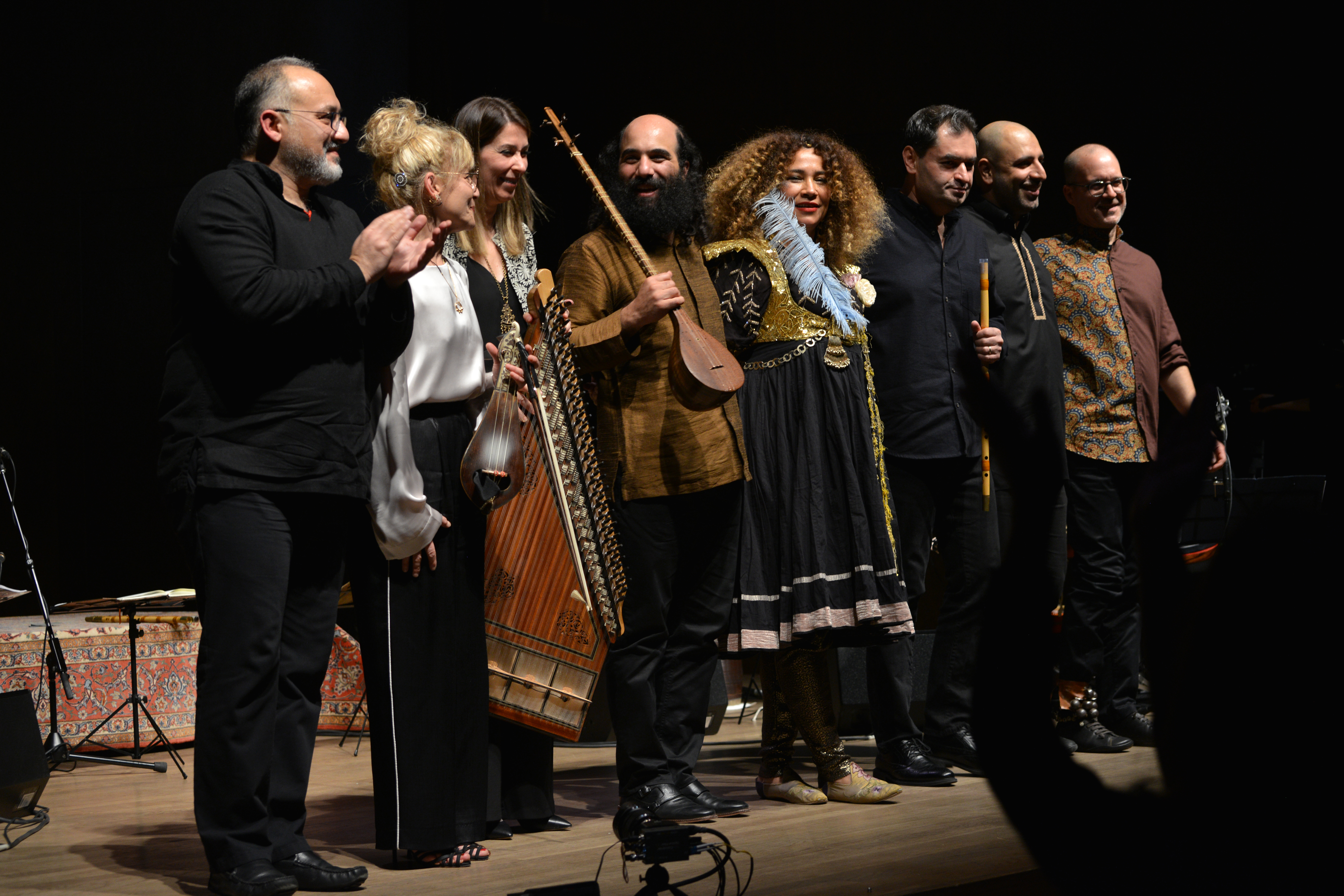

Background information
- Origin: Montreal, Quebec, Canada
- Genre: World music
- Years active: 2001-present
- Labels: ATMA Classique, Analekta
- Website: https://constantinople.ca/en
- JUNO Awards - Winner of the Best Classical Album of the Year (Small Ensemble) Anděl Awards - Classical Music Winner

Constantinople is a Montreal-based early music and middle eastern music ensemble. The group was formed in 2001 by its artistic director Kiya Tabassian (setar).

In its creations, Constantinople collaborates with prominent figures in the music industry such as Kayhan Kalhor, Ablaye Cissoko, Ghalia Benali, Françoise Atlan, Hana Blažíková, Shashank Subramanyam, and Marco Beasley.

Constantinople produces three or four new works each year and travels to collaborate with top musicians based on project requirements. These creations form the regular season presented in Montreal, Quebec, Ottawa, and Toronto. Subsequently, the works are featured in performance tours across Canada and internationally. Some of these creations are also recorded. Over the years, Constantinople has developed nearly 60 creations, with 23 being recorded, and has toured in more than 290 cities across 57 countries.

Two of its most recent creations include "Traversées," featuring Ablaye Cissoko, and "Chants d'Espoir" with Kayhan Kalhor.

In 2024, the Constantinople ensemble won the 2024 JUNO Awards for the Best Classical Album of the Year (Small Ensemble) with Il Ponte di Leonardo. In 2025, they won the Classical award at the Anděl Awards for their album Pilgrimage in collaboration with Cappella Mariana.

== Historic ==
The musical ensemble was created in 2001 by the Iranian-Canadian brothers, Kiya and Ziya Tabassian, who arrived in Quebec as teenagers.

Kiya Tabassian is the artistic director of the ensemble. Having arrived in Montreal in 1990 at the age of 14, he grew up in Iran. At the age of 12, Kiya Tabassian discovered and immediately became passionate about the setâr. The desire to create and compose music emerged through his practice of the instrument; even at a young age, he reinterpreted pieces from the traditional repertoire of Persian music.

The musical project of Constantinople revolves around a perpetual blending of cultures and encounters between musicians from around the world. Rather than simply recomposing ancient and traditional music, the ensemble focuses on creating entirely new works inspired by various places and periods.

Constantinople's first album was released in 2001 under the ATMA Classique label. Its discography counts 21 albums in 2023.

Constantinople stands as one of the most active Montreal-based ensembles on the international stage, having performed in renowned venues and festivals worldwide:

=== Europe ===
- Berliner Philharmonie (Berlin, Germany)
- Vienna Konzerthaus (Vienna, Austria)
- Salle Pleyel (Paris, France)
- Oratoire du Louvre (Paris, France)
- Institut du Monde Arabe (Paris, France)
- Aix-en-Provence Festival (Aix-en-Provence, France)
- Anopolis World Music Festival (Thessaloniki, Greece)
- Onassis Cultural Center (Athens, Greece)
- Philharmonie Luxembourg (Luxembourg)
- British Museum (London, United Kingdom)
- Lavaux Classic (Vaud, Switzerland)
- Alcázar of Seville (Seville, Spain)
- Elbphilharmonie Hamburg (Hamburg, Germany)

=== America ===
- Salle Bourgie (Montreal, Canada)
- Grand Théâtre de Québec (Quebec, Canada)
- The Elora Festival (Elora, Canada)
- Festival de Lanaudière (Lanaudière, Canada)
- Metropolitan Museum of Art (New York, United States)
- Festival Internacional de Puebla (Puebla, Mexico)
- Festival Internacional Cervantino (Guanajuato, Mexico)
- World Music Panama (Panama City, Panama)

=== Asia ===
- Hong Kong Arts Festival (Hong Kong, China)
- Jeonju International Sori Festival (Jeonju, South Korea)
- Udaipur World Music Festival (Udaipur, India)

=== Africa ===
- Jerusalem Sacred Music Festival (Jerusalem)
- Fez Festival of World Sacred Music (Fès, Morocco)
- Festival Au tour des cordes (Saint-Louis, Senegal)

=== Oceania ===
- WOMAD (Adelaide, Australia)
- WOMAD (New Plymouth, New Zealand)

== Members ==
Kiya Tabassian, born in Tehran in 1976, serves as the artistic director of the ensemble. He is frequently joined by certain musicians in many projects, including Didem Başar (kanun), Patrick Graham (percussions), Tanya LaPerrière (viola d'amore), and Hamin Honari (percussions).

== Pieces and Instruments ==
The Constantinople ensemble aims to interpret a diverse repertoire spanning medieval, baroque, and contemporary aesthetics, from the Mediterranean Europe to the East. With over 50 creations to its credit, the ensemble has performed concerts in more than 55 countries. In "Passages," the ensemble showcases the Iranian setâr, Turkish kamancheh, Lebanese oud, Persian tombak, and kanun.

== Discography ==
- Musique du Moyen Âge et de la Renaissance – instrumental (Atma 22269)
- Memoria Sefardí – Musique d'Espagne juive et chrétienne (no texts) (Atma 22274)
- Li Tans Nouveaus – troubadours Châtelain de Coucy, Li nouviauz tanz et mais et violete. (texts) Anne Azéma (Atma)
- De Castille à Samarkand (no texts) with Guy Ross (Atma 22383)
- Greece - Carrefour De La Méditerrannée (texts) with ensemble En Chordais (Atma) Atma Classique ACD 22314
- Que le Yable les emporte – traditional songs of Quebec (texts) with Bernard Simard Atma Classique, ACD 22316
- Terres Turquoises, La princessa y el caballero (texts in Spanish and one in Arabic) Françoise Atlan
- Mania - instrumental music Tabassian brothers Atma Classique, ACD 22340
- Terra nostra - 17th century Mexico (Spanish texts) José Ángel Guttiérrez, Teresita de Jesús Islas (Atma 22567)
- Ay Amor – songs in French based on Codax etc. (texts) with Francoise Atlan (Atma) Atma Classique ACD 22594
- Premiers Songes - on poems of Sor Juana Inés de la Cruz Analekta AN 2 9989
- Metamorfosi - Italian baroque
- Marco Polo - En Chordais and Constantinople World Village - Harmonia Mundi
- Jardins migrateurs - an encounter between Mandingo and Persian music Analekta 2 9142
- Il Ponte di Leonardo - with Marco Beasley) - Glossa GCD924503
- Pilgrimage - with Capella Mariana, Supraphon
- Nordic Lights in Persian Sky - with Benedicte Maurseth, Glossa
- Estuaire, with Ablaye Cissoko, MaCase
- Dialogos, with Holland Baroque, Pentatone
- Clair-obscur, with A Filetta, Constantinople
