= Johnny Gandelsman =

Russian-Israeli violinist

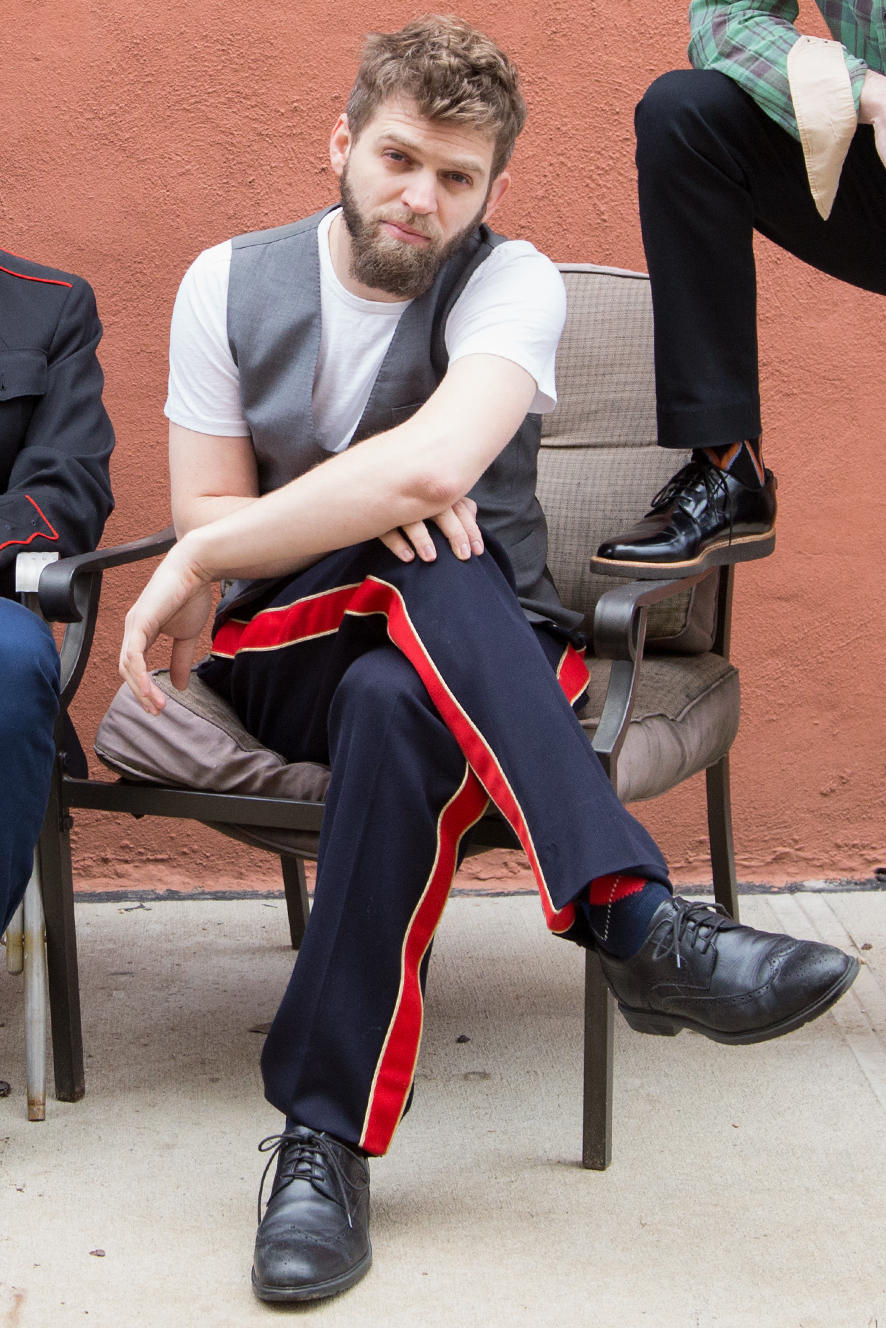
- Gandelsman in 2015

Background information
- Born: 1978 (age 47–48); Moscow, USSR
- Genres: Classical, experimental
- Instrument: Violin
- Member of: Brooklyn Rider

Johnny Gandelsman (born 1978) is a Russian-Israeli violinist and music producer, known for his work as a member of the American string quartet Brooklyn Rider as well as his solo work. From 2009 to 2014 he performed with The Knights ensemble, and in 2013 he was a soloist with them at the Naumburg Orchestral Concerts, in the Naumburg Bandshell, Central Park, in the summer series.

In 2024, he was the recipient of a MacArthur Grant.

== Biography ==
Gandelsman was born in Moscow, in the then-USSR, to a violist father and a pianist mother. His sister is also a violinist. His family left Moscow for Israel in 1990, and Gandelsman moved to the United States at the age of 17.

== Career ==
In 2020, Gandelsman recorded Johann Sebastian Bach's Cello Suites on the violin, in a performance The New York Times called "feather-light and rooted in dance and folk music".

On November 8 and 9, 2024, the week of the 2024 United States presidential election, Gandelsman performed his piece This is America at the Metropolitan Museum of Art. Initially released in 2022, This is America consists of 28 pieces Gandelsman commissioned from a variety of musicians, including Rhiannon Giddens, Angélica Negrón, and Conrad Tao.
