= Sangidorjiin Sansargereltekh =

Mongolian composer

Sangidorjiin Sansargereltekh (Mongolian: Сангидоржийн Сансаргэрэлтэх; born 1969 in Ulaanbaatar) is a Mongolian composer.

Sansargereltekh had piano lessons as a child from his father, Choigiv Sangidorj. He studied from 1977 to 1985 at the Music School of Ulaanbaatar, studying piano with Lodoidambyn Nasanbat and composition with Sembiin Gonchigsumlaa. He continued his piano studies at the Music Academy with Puntsagiin Pagma and studied at the Moscow Conservatory from 1989 in composition with Albert Leman and piano with Elena Saweljewa. This was followed by a post-graduate studies with Leman, and from 1997 to 1999, graduated from the Real Conservatorio Superior de Música de Madrid. In 1999 he was awarded at the Autumn Festival in Ulaanbaatar for the best piano work. Commissioned by Yo-Yo Ma for the Silk Road Project, he contributed to a ballad for Mongolian instruments and the chamber ensemble Kara-Khorum in 2000. Sangidorj splits his time between Mongolia and the United States.
