= Clive Driskill-Smith =

English organist

- Born: 1978
- Occupation: Organist
- Member of: Organized Rhythm

Clive Driskill-Smith (born 1978) is an English organist.

== Biography ==
Winner of the Royal College of Organists’ Performer of the Year Competition in 2000 and the Calgary International Organ Competition in 2002, Clive performs throughout Europe, North America, Asia and Australia. In the UK he has played at the BBC Proms, the Royal Festival Hall, Symphony Hall and Bridgewater Hall, and in the US he has played at Regional and National Conventions of the American Guild of Organists. His CDs have received critical acclaim and his performances have been broadcast on radio and television worldwide.

A pupil of David Sanger and Hans Fagius, Clive was successively a Music Scholar at Eton College, Organ Scholar at Winchester Cathedral and Assistant Organist at Winchester College, and then Organ Scholar at Christ Church, Oxford where he was Sub-Organist. He played for the daily services in the Cathedral and for the choir’s many concerts, recordings, broadcasts and tours under the direction of Stephen Darlington.

Clive teaches the organ at the Royal Academy of Music and is a Liveryman of the Worshipful Company of Musicians.

He performs with the American percussionist Joseph Gramley in the duo Organized Rhythm.
