= Silent City (album) =

Studio album by Kayhan Kalhor and Brooklyn Rider
- Released: July 28, 2008
- Recorded: Knoop Studios, River Edge, New Jersey
- Genre: Classical, Traditional Middle Eastern Folk
- Length: 52:59
- Label: World Village Records
- Producer: Kayhan Kalhor

Professional ratings
Review scores
Source	Rating
AllMusic	Not rated
Pitchfork Media	7.6/10 stars

The Silent City is an album by New York City-based string quartet, Brooklyn Rider and Iranian musician Kayhan Kalhor, released by World Village Records in 2008.

Kalhor met members of Brooklyn Rider in 2000 at Tanglewood, where they took part in the cellist Yo-Yo Ma's Silk Road Project.

The title track is a Kalhor composition originally Included on Yo-Yo Ma's New Impossibilities, it is an elegy for Halabjah, a Kurdish city razed by Saddam Hussein.

== Track listing ==
1. "Ascending Bird" (Siamak Aghaei, C. Jacobsen) – 6:54
2. "Silent City" (Kayhan Kalhor) – 29:10
3. "Parvaz" (Kalhor) – 6:23
4. "Beloved, do not let me be discouraged" (C. Jacobsen) – 10:34

== Personnel ==
- Kayhan Kalhor – Kamancheh, Setar

Brooklyn Rider

- Colin Jacobsen – Violin
- Jonathan Gandelsman – Violin
- Nicholas Cords – Viola
- Eric Jacobsen – Cello

Additional musicians

- Jeff Beecher – Bass
- Mark Suter – Percussion
- Siamak Aghaei – Tombak, Santur on "Parvaz"

== Charts ==
Chart (2009)	Peak position
US Top Classical Crossover Albums	18
