= Lost Songs of the Silk Road =

Studio album by Ghazal
- Released: 1997
- Label: Shanachie
- Producer: Brian Cullman

Ghazal chronology
Lost Songs of the Silk Road (1997)	As Night Falls on the Silk Road (1998)

Lost Songs of the Silk Road is the debut album by Ghazal, a trio made up of Iranian and Indian musicians. Swapan Chaudhuri played the tabla, Kayhan Kalhor played the kamancheh, and Shujaat Khan played the sitar. The album was released in 1997.

== Production ==
The album was produced by Brian Cullman. It was recorded in New York City. The songs began with a basic melody played by Kalhor and Khan, before turning to improvisation.

== Critical recpeption ==
Professional ratings
Review scores
Source	Rating
AllMusic	5/5 stars
The Encyclopedia of Popular Music	3/5 stars
MusicHound World: The Essential Album Guide	5/5 stars

The New York Times stated: "Each piece is a long three-way improvisation based on simple melodies that the players push back and forth, and the reedy scrape of Kayhan Kalhor's bowed fiddle creeps out stealthily like a human voice, a rough and ancient sound against the metallic ringing of the sitar." Billboard deemed the album a "soulful, pioneering hybrid."

The Oregonian praised the "slow, dreamlike improvisations marked by elegant thematic development and marvelous subtlety and detail." Ethnomusicology concluded that "the melodic expression on this CD hovers somewhere between dastgah and rag, but Shujaat's forceful improvisations tend to pull the whole closer to Indian styles and structures."

AllMusic called the album "a fascinating meeting of Persian and Indian musical and cultural influences."

== Track listing ==
No.	Title	Length
1.	"The Saga of the Rising Sun"
2.	"Come with Me"
3.	"You Are My Moon"
4.	"Safar/Journey"
