= Ghazal (band) =

Indo-Iranian fusion classical group

Ghazal is a band formed by Kurdish-Iranian kamencheh player Kayhan Kalhor, Indian sitarist Shujaat Khan, and Indian tabla player Swapan Chaudhuri. Together, they perform music blending North Indian and Persian classical and light classical traditions.

Ghazal's 2003 live album The Rain was nominated in 2004 for the Grammy Award for Best Traditional World Music Album.

== Albums ==
- Lost Songs of the Silk Road (1997, Shanachie)
- As Night Falls on the Silk Road (1998, Shanachie)
- Moon Rise over the Silk Road (2000, Shanachie)
- The Rain (2003, ECM)
