= The Rain (album) =

Live album by Ghazal
- Released: August 2003
- Recorded: May 28, 2001
- Length: 53:06
- Label: ECM; ECM 1840
- Producer: Kjell Keller, Manfred Eicher

Ghazal chronology
Moon Rise over the Silk Road (2000)	The Rain (2003)

The Rain is a live album by the Persian-Indian hybrid ensemble Ghazal, comprising kamancheh player Kayhan Kalhor vocalist and sitar player Shujaat Husain Khan, and tabla player Sandeep Das, recorded at a live concert at Radio Studio DRS in Bern on May 28, 2001 and released on ECM in August 2003. The album was nominated for a Grammy Award for Best Traditional World Music Album in 2004.

== Track listing ==
No.	Title	Length
1.	"Fire"	18:18
2.	"Dawn"	14:58
3.	"Eternity"	19:50

== Personnel ==
=== Ghazal ===
- Kayhan Kalhor – kemenche
- Shujaat Husain Khan – sitar, vocals
- Sandeep Das – tabla

=== Technical Personnel ===
- Kjell Keller – recording producer
- Andy Mettler – recording engineer
- Manfred Eicher – producer
- Jan Erik Kongshaug, Kayhan Kalhor, Manfred Eicher – editing, remix, and mastering
  - Edited, remixed, and mastered at Rainbow Studio, Oslo, Norway
- Sascha Kleis – design
- Gérald Minkoff, Cylla von Tiedemann, Ira Landgarten – photography
