= Scattering Stars Like Dust =

Scattering Stars Like Dust نخستین دیدار بامدادی

Studio album by Kayhan Kalhor
- Released: 6 June 1998
- Studio: Sorcerer Sound, New York City
- Genre: World music, Persian traditional music
- Length: 47:20
- Label: Traditional Crossroads
- Producer: Harold Hagopian

Professional ratings
Review scores
Source	Rating
Allmusic	4/5 stars

Scattering Stars Like Dust (Persian: نخستین دیدار بامدادی) is a solo album by Iranian musician Kayhan Kalhor, released on 9 June 1998 in the United States through Traditional Crossroads records.

Scattering Stars Like Dust is a 47-minute suite for Kamancheh and the Tombak drum. Like most Persian music, it is improvised and based on a large traditional collection of short, melodic motifs. It contains three sections. Some unusual time signatures come from Kurdish music and the album's title from a poem by Rumi.

== Track listing ==
All music is composed by Kayhan Kalhor.

No.	Title	Length
1.	"Scattering Stars Like Dust: "I. Introduction "; "II. Improvisation "; "III. Duet For Kamancheh And Tombak; "	47:20: 10:51; 24:27; 12:02
Total length:		47:20

== Personnel ==
- Pejman Hadadi – Tombak
- Kayhan Kalhor – Kamancheh
