= Kurdish maqam =

Traditional styles of Kurdish maqam

Kurdish maqam (Kurdish: مەقامی کوردی, romanized: Meqamî Kurdî, Kurdish pronunciation: [ma.qaːˈmiː ˈkuɾ.diː]) is a traditional melodic system used in Kurdish music, distinguished by its modal structure and use of microtonality. Originating in the Kurdish regions of the Middle East, it serves as a key element of Kurdish musical heritage and is often associated with specific emotional and cultural contexts. Performances of Kurdish maqam often combine structured melodies with improvisation, using traditional instruments such as the tenbûr and saz. While rooted in heritage, the style has adapted over time, occasionally blending with genres like jazz and electronic music in contemporary interpretations.

Şerte fiřêdem bed u bedfeřî (Kurdish: شەرتە فڕێدەم بەد و بەدفەڕی) a Kurdish maqam with music, by Hassan Zirak, 1971–1972

Kurdish maqams are traditionally classified into seven main families: Hijaz, Saba, Bayat, Kurd, Hijazkar, Rast, and Ajam. Each family includes its own subdivisions and melodic variations. However, the overall system is often grouped into two broader types: Kurd and Hijazkar. Another recognized type within the Kurdish maqam tradition is Nahawand.

== Maqam families ==
Saba
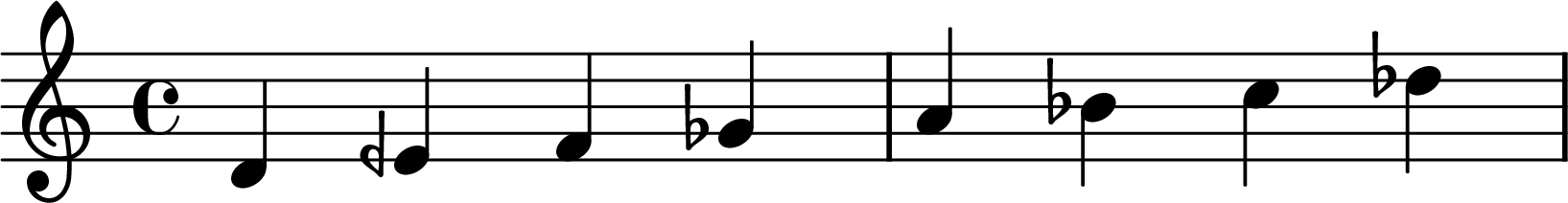

Bayati

Hijaz

Rast

- ‘Ajam – ‘Ecem (Kurdish: عەجەم).
- Bayat – Beyat (Kurdish: بەیات)
- Hijaz – Also The Phrygian Dominant Scale Ĥîjaz (Kurdish: حیجاز), Hijazkar (Kurdish: حیجازکار)
- Kurd – Also the Phrygian Scale Kurd (Kurdish: مەقامی کورد), Hijazkar Kurd (Kurdish: حیجازكار کورد)
- Nahawand – Nehawend (Kurdish: نەھاوەند)
- Rast – Řast (Arabic: ڕاست)
  - Allawaysi – Ellaweysî (Kurdish: ئەڵڵاوەیسی)
- Saba – Seba (Arabic: سەبا)

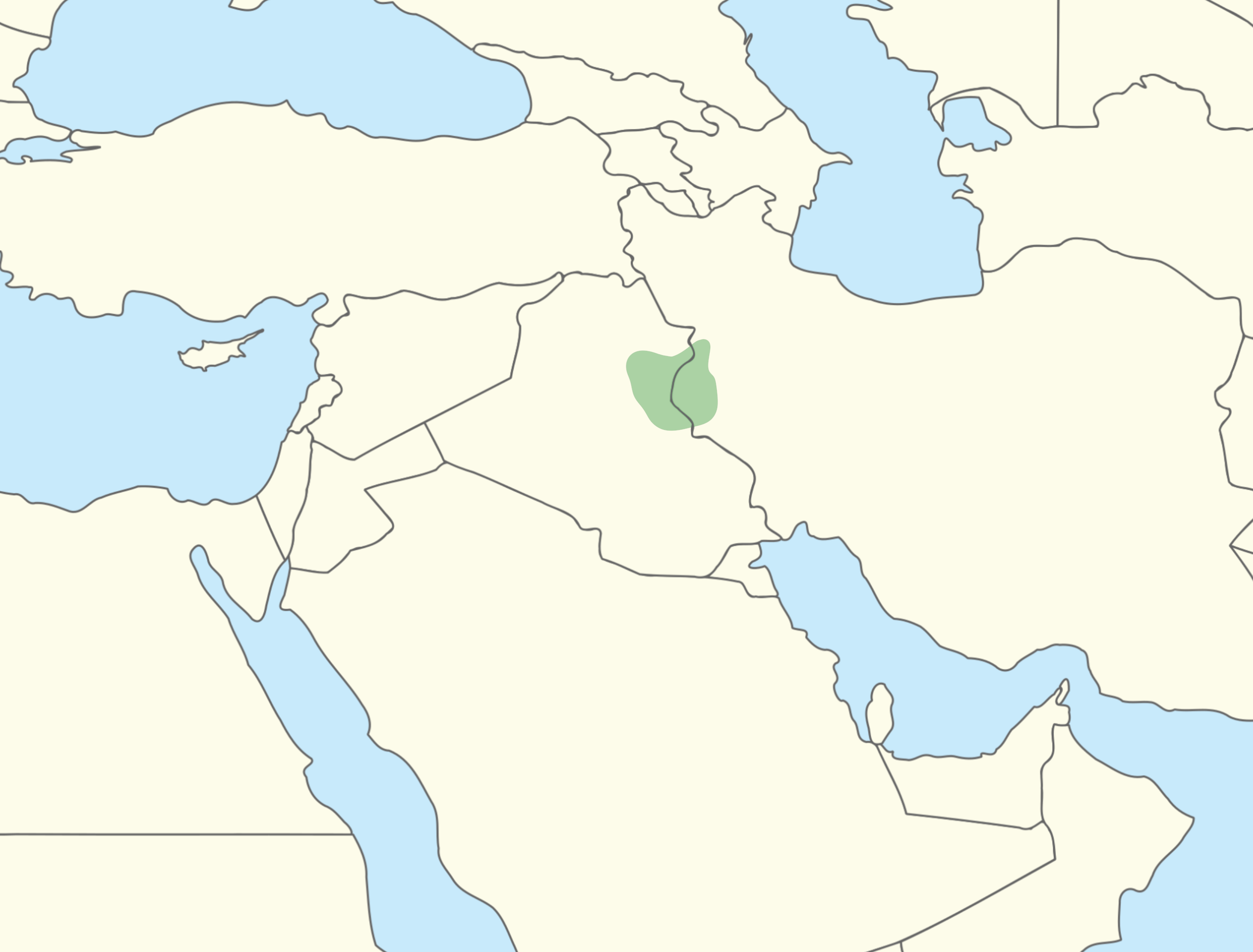
Geographical origins of the Ellaweysî maqam

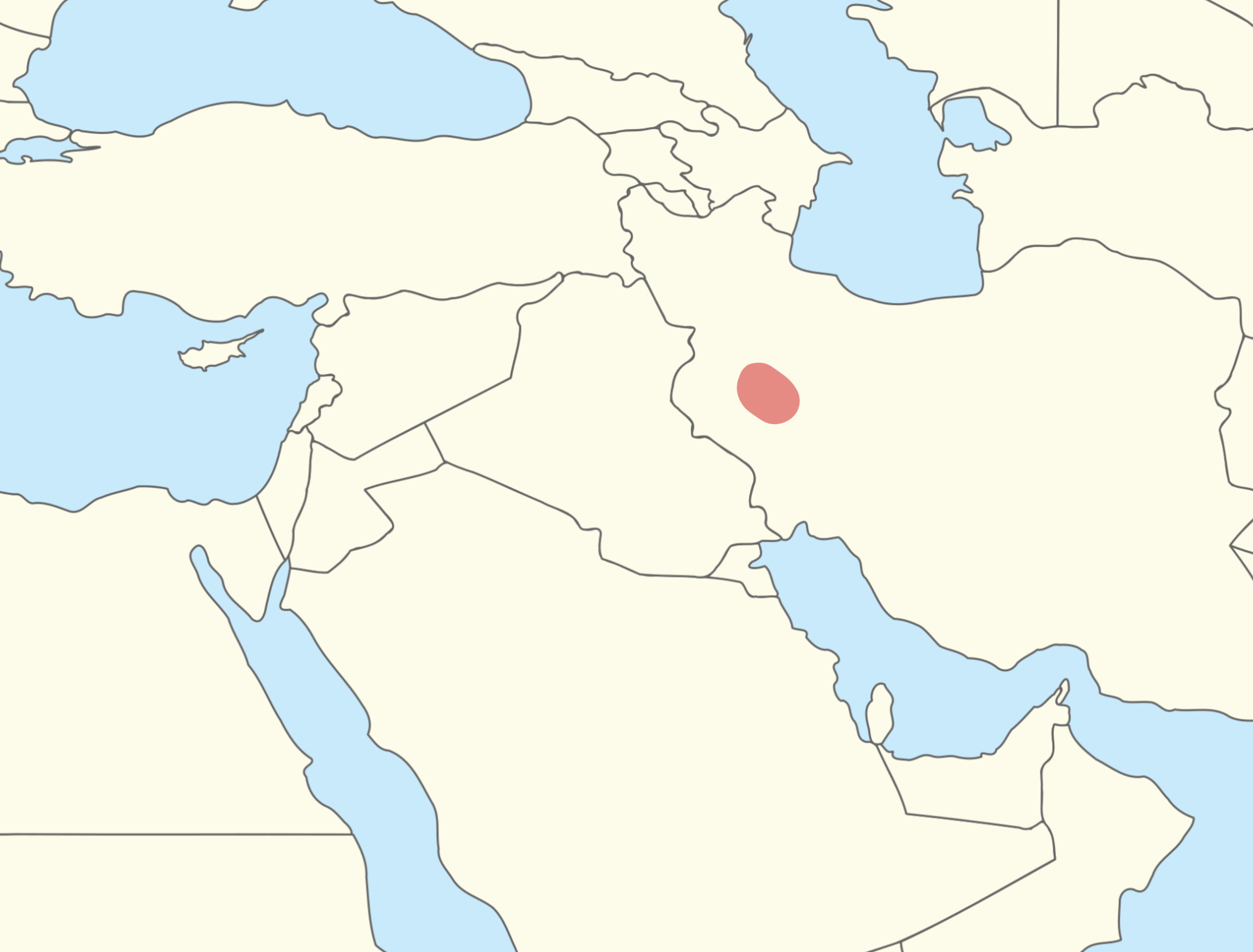
Geographical origins of the Beyat maqam

== See also ==
- Taqsim
- Arabic maqam
- Melody
