= Hope Lies Within =

American progressive metal band

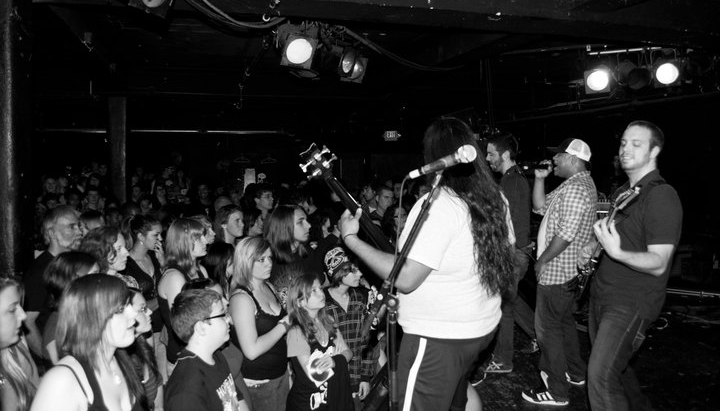
- Hope Lies Within performing in 2010 at Pearl Street night club

Background information
- Origin: Springfield, Massachusetts, United States
- Genres: Progressive metal, progressive rock
- Years active: 2004–present
- Label: Unsigned
- Members: Uriah Rodriguez; Marco Bonilla; Dan Nawskon; Steve Padla; Nick Egerton
- Past members: Michael Hines; James Zabik; Thomas Snyder; Damien Tetrault; Jacob Lentner; Bryan Klein; Alex Patsenco; Frank Dixon; William Forbes
- Website: www.hopelieswithin.com

Hope Lies Within is an American progressive metal band from Springfield, Massachusetts, United States, formed in 2004. Hope Lies Within's current lineup consists of vocalist Uriah Rodriguez, bassist Marco Bonilla, guitarists Daniel Nawskon and Nick Egerton, and drummer Steven Padla. The band has released one studio EP entitled The Silent City and one Full Length Album entitled "Hope Lies Within".

== History ==
=== 2003–2006 ===
Hope Lies Within began originally as A Crimson Victory, a Western Massachusetts garage band formed by original members Mike Hines, Marco Bonilla and Thomas Snyder in 2003. In late 2003 early 2004 Alex Patsenko was added to the band's line up as vocalist and the band was officially renamed Hope Lies Within. After a short stint with Hope Lies Within, Alex went on to further his college education. In 2005 Frank Dixon was brought on as replacement singer for Alex and Kevin Casey joined as a second guitar player. The band began writing what was to be a never released EP for the current line up, however creative differences began to arise with the new members. Kevin Casey was interested in a different path musically and the remaining members were not pleased with Frank Dixon's singing style. James Zabik stepped in as Kevin Casey's replacement. While attending music school in Holyoke, Massachusetts, the band's creator Michael Hines met Uriah Rodriguez. Uriah had been studying classical voice but was very much interested in other musical projects. Mike convinced Uriah to join Hope Lies Within as its new vocalist.

=== 2006–2008 ===
Over the next two years the band spent writing new material. The Old material had been scrapped mainly because Uriah is a baritone and most of the music had been written for a tenor, in addition the band's style and influence had begun to change as each member grew musically. The band quickly formed a tight musical bond and friendships grew. Hope Lies Within began recording its first release the 6 song EP "The Silent City" which was released in 2007. Shortly after tensions began mounting between the band and their ever-absent drummer. Thomas Snyder began to distance himself from Hope Lies Within for his own personal reasons and ultimately left Hope Lies Within. Thomas went to visit family in Florida and decided he was going to stay, he broke the news to Hope Lies Within through email. "We were shocked but not surprised. We felt him growing further from us all the time." said Uriah Rodriguez. Damien Tetrault of the band I Am Disaster joined to fill the gap and help keep the band's momentum, while a more permanent replacement could be found.

=== 2008–2010 ===
In late 2008 band members James Zabik and founding member Mike Hines decided to part ways with band. This served to be one of the band's lowest yet defining moments. James cited he was no longer interested in making music and Mike was looking to enter the Christian Music world (Mike went on to form the band Astoria). Left without guitar players Damien was no longer needed and he too parted ways with the band. With just its vocalist and bassist Hope Lies Within stood in ruin. However the two remaining members persisted on. Over the next two years vocalist Uriah Rodriguez and bassist Marco Bonilla set out to replace the lost members of Hope Lies Within. They created open auditions and had seen hundreds of musicians. Hope Lies Within's remaining members were not only looking for replacements, they used this opportunity to strengthen the musicianship of the band. During this time members Jacob Lentner and Bryan Klien had short runs with Hope Lies Within and they served to help bring in its current members. Jacob Lentner was the first guitarist brought on, shortly after Bryan Klein joined on drums. At the time they seemed like great fits however finding a second guitarist was proving to be more difficult. Daniel Nawskon, a good friend of Uriah and Marco, agreed to fill in temporarily but ultimately was convinced to join full-time, however problems began to arise with Bryan and his personal life. Guitarist Dan Nawskon suggestion the band ask a long time personal friend and drummer Steven Padla if he'd be interested in joining Hope Lies Within. Hope Lies Within agreed collectively that letting Bryan move on and bringing in Steve was the best thing for everyone, so the change was made. The band quickly began writing new music however in the summer of 2009 Jake decided he would no longer be available. The band persisted without a second guitarist. Soon after Jake was replaced by now current Band member William Forbes.

=== 2011 ===
After finally resolving the line up changes Hope Lies Within began writing and quickly turned out 7 new songs in the process. They began playing again and began recording their first full-length album.

=== 2012 ===
In May 2012 Hope Lies Within released its first Full Length Album entitled "Hope Lies Within". This album features a remake of the classical German piece Erlkönig by composer Franz Schubert. In addition the 4th track Blindside features a guest guitar solo by guitarist Oli Herbert of the American heavy metal band All That Remains.

== Musical style and influences ==
Hope Lies Within's genre is largely considered progressive metal or progressive rock, combining elements of metal, classical voice, jazz & R&B. Hope Lies Within incorporates both singing and screaming vocals in their music.

== Erlkönig (Schubert) ==
While studying at the University of Massachusetts Amherst vocalist Uriah Rodriguez was introduced to the famous classical piece Erlkönig by composer Franz Schubert. So taken by the composition that Hope Lies Within sought to create a more modern variation of the piece. Released as the 9th and 11th(The English version is unlisted on the CD) tracks on the 2012 release of "Hope Lies Within", the piece has been completely updated with modern instruments including; guitar, bass and drums, yet maintains the same harmonic progression and much of the same thematic material of the original Franz Schubert piece in both the German version, with original text from the librettist Johann Wolfgang von Goethe and an English adaptation of the poem translated and rewritten by Hope Lies Within. In conjunction with the band's musical release, permission was granted to Hope Lies Within by artist Benjamin Zelkowicz to adapt his already released sand art video The ErlKing (animated short) to their musical version of Erlkönig.

== Band members ==
Current members

- Uriah Rodriguez-vocals(2006–present)
- Marco Bonilla-bass guitar(2004–present)
- Daniel Nawskon-guitar(2009–present)
- Steve Padla-drums(2009–present)
- Nick Egerton-guitar(2016–present)

Former members

- Michael Hines-guitar(2004-2008)
- Thomas Snyder-drums(2004-2007)
- Alex Patsenko-vocals(2004)
- Kevin Kasey-guitar(2005)
- Frank Dixon-vocals(2005)
- James Zabik-guitar(2005-2008)
- Damien Tetrault-drums(2008)
- Jacob Lentner-guitar(2009)
- Bryan Klien-Drums(2009)
- William Forbes-guitar(2010–2014)

== Discography ==
Studio albums

- The Silent City (2007)
- Hope Lies Within (2012)
