= Mercan Dede =

Turkish musician (born 1966)

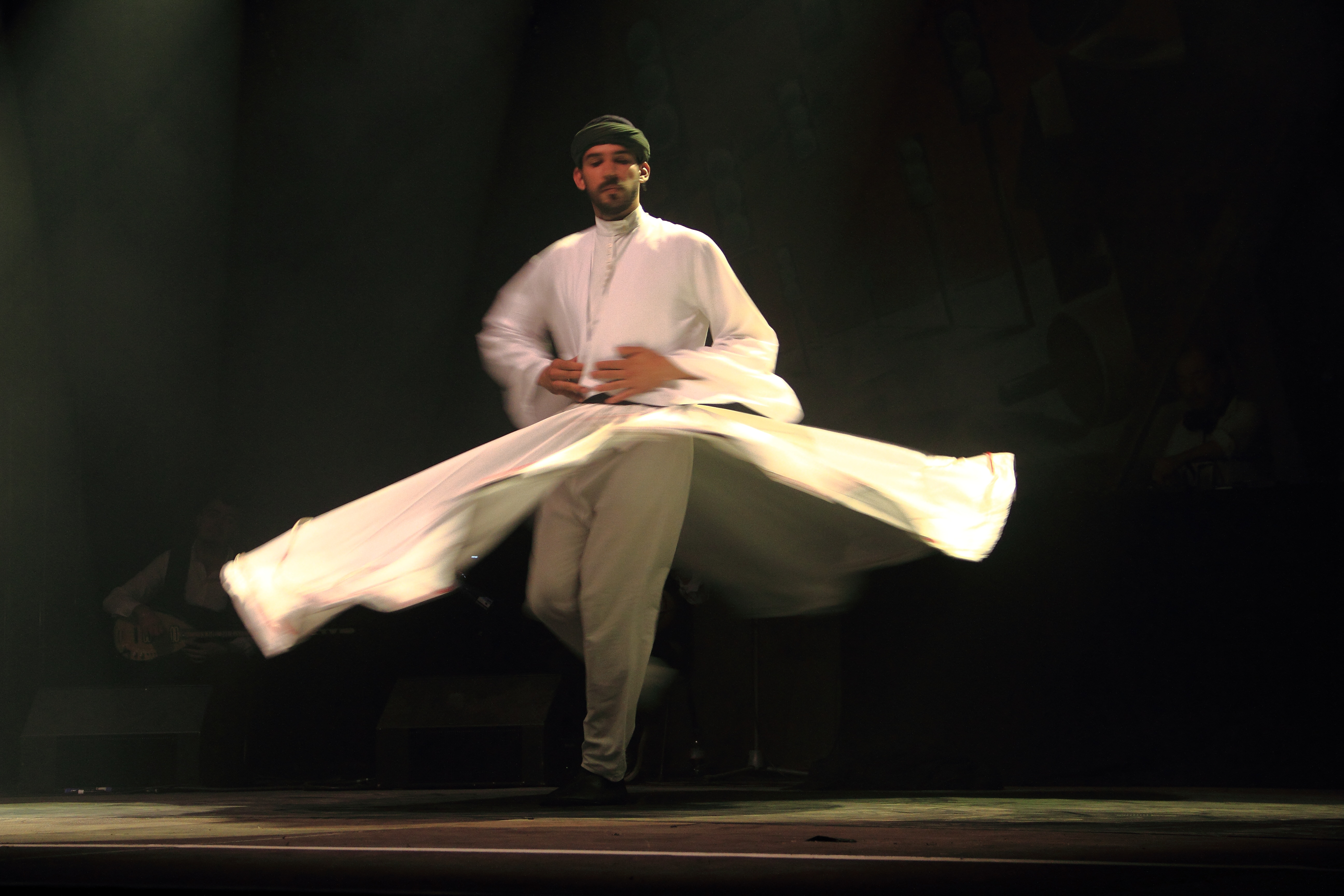
- Dede in 2014

Background information
- Birth name: Arkın Ilıcalı
- Also known as: DJ Arkin Allen
- Born: 1966; Bursa, Turkey
- Genres: World music
- Occupation: Musician
- Instruments: Ney; bendir
- Member of: Mercan Dede Ensemble
- Website: mercandede.com

Mercan Dede (born Arkın Ilıcalı, 1966), also known as DJ Arkin Allen, is a Turkish-Canadian composer, ney and bendir player, DJ, and producer. He is a world music artist, playing a fusion of traditional acoustic Turkish and other oriental styles with electronic sounds. Dede has worked in collaboration with Turkish and international musicians, such as Susheela Raman, Azam Ali, Dhafer Youssef, Sheema Mukherjee (Transglobal Underground), and Hugh Marsh.

== Early life and education ==
Dede was born to working-class secular parents in Bursa.

He moved to Istanbul to study journalism and photography at Istanbul University. Upon graduation, he received a scholarship from the University of Saskatchewan and moved to Montreal, Canada.

== Career ==
The Mercan Dede Ensemble was founded in 1997, by which time Ilıcalı had been working as a musician for some years. Their first album was Sufi Dreams, released in 1998. This album got a boost when the music was used in a German television documentary on Sufi music.

In 2001, Dede released his third album, Seyahatname. The record includes the sound of the ney, a Middle Eastern end-blown flute. Dede describes the sound of this instrument as "a pure, universal spiritual sound evoking deep feelings, deeper than we can comprehend in just our short time on earth. The ney speaks the language of love, instantly comprehensible in the heart, compared to which all the mosques, churches, and temples built to decorate (our spirituality) drift away". The album is Dede's personal effort to reflect on his own spiritual journey.

Dede's 2002 album, Nâr, continued in the same vein. In 2004, he released Su, which stayed at number one on European World Music Charts for two months. The album was recorded with an international lineup of musicians and has more vocals on it than the previous works. One track, featuring folk singer Sabahat Akkiraz, was particularly popular in Turkey. Dede made his US debut at the first Globalfest that year, followed by a North American tour and the release of the album Fusion Monster, under the name Arkin Allen. The artist was commissioned by the Turkish Ministry of Culture as the music director of the Guldestan project to represent Turkish culture and arts all around the globe, working alongside choreographer Beyhan Murphy.

The 2007 album Nefes included Transglobal Underground sitar player Sheema Mukherjee in the lineup. The record includes songs in Turkish, Arabic, and French.

== Partial discography ==
- Sufi Dreams (1998)
- Journeys of a Dervish (1999)
- Seyahatname (2001)
- Nar (2002)
- Sufi Traveler (2004 – repackaging of Seyahatname and Nar)
- Fusion Monster (2004) (as DJ Arkin Allen)
- Su (2003)
- Sufi Traveler (2004)
- Nefes/Breath (2007)
- 800 (2007)
- Dünya/Earth (2013)
- Mercan Dede Box Set (2016, 5 CDs)

== Achievements ==
- The album 800 was selected as Best World Music Album of 2008 by WOMEX.
- Dede has been nominated by BBC 3 Awards for World Music in the Middle East and North Africa category twice and three times in the Club Global category.
- Featured in Fatih Akin's documentary Crossing the Bridge: The Sound of Istanbul.
- Composer of some music for the 2003 dance piece Nefés by German choreographer Pina Bausch.

== See also ==
- Music of Turkey
