= Kayhan Kalhor =

Iranian Kurdish musician (born 1964)

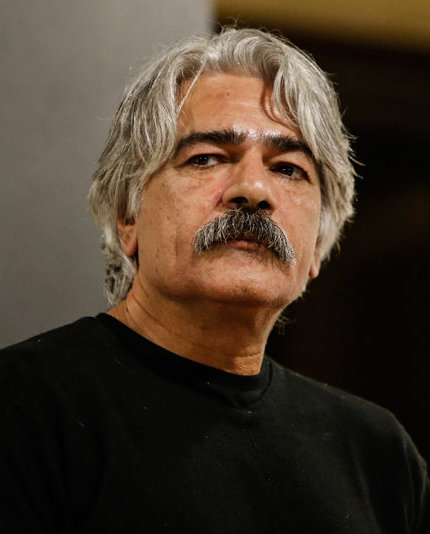
- Kalhor in 2017

Background information
- Born: 24 November 1964 (age 61); Tehran, Iran
- Genres: Iranian traditional music, Kurdish music
- Occupations: Musician, composer
- Instruments: Kamancheh, setar
- Years active: 1973–present
- Member of: Ghazal
- Formerly of: Silk Road Ensemble
- Website: kayhankalhor.net

Kayhan Kalhor (Persian: کیهان کلهر, born on 24 November 1964) is an Iranian Kurdish kamancheh and setar player, and composer. He has received three Grammy Award for Best Traditional World Music Album nominations. Kalhor has also earned two nominations and won one Grammy Award for Best Global Music Album as a member of the Silk Road Ensemble.

== Early life and education ==
Kayhan Kalhor was born in Tehran to a Kurdish family. His mother was named Aqdas, while his father was Abbas Heydari Kalhor, a senior employee in the Iranian Ministry of Agriculture, and the grandson of Mehr Ali Khan, one of the leaders of the Kalhor tribe. He began studying music at the age of seven. By the age of thirteen, he was playing in the National Orchestra of Radio and Television of Iran. Continuing his music studies under the supervision of various teachers, he studied in the Iranian radif tradition and also travelled to study in the northern part of Khorasan province, where music traditions have Kurdish and Turkish influences as well as Persian. At a musical conservatory in Tehran, Kalhor worked under the directorship of Mohammad-Reza Lotfi who is from the northeast of Iran. Kalhor also travelled in the northwestern provinces of Iran. At age 17, he left Iran and moved to Italy to study music in Rome. He migrated to Italy by land, walking through Turkey, Romania, and Yugoslavia, picking up menial farm work along the way to support himself. After studying music in Rome, he moved to Canada, where he graduated from the music program at Carleton University in Ottawa.

Four years after Kalhor left Iran, his parents and brother were killed in an Iraqi missile attack during the Iran-Iraq War.

A 2014 London performance with santur player Ali Bahrami Fard consisted largely of an extended, improvised version of I Will Not Stand Alone. Reviewing the concert for The Guardian, Robin Denselow noted the piece's movement between plucked and bowed kamancheh passages and exchanges between the two musicians.

== Career ==
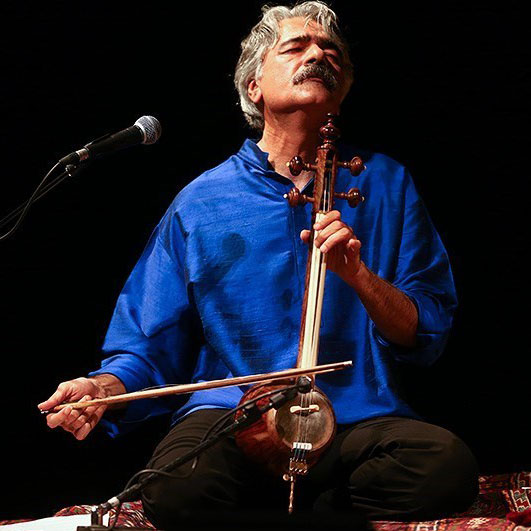
Kalhor during a concert in Vahdat Hall, 2016

Kalhor has a wide range of musical influences, uses several musical instruments, and crosses cultural borders with his work, but at his center he is an intense player of the kamancheh. In his playing Kalhor often pins Iranian classical music structures to the rich folk modes and melodies of the Kurdish tradition of Iran.

Kalhor has composed works for and played alongside the famous Iranian vocalists Mohammad Reza Shajarian and Shahram Nazeri. He has also composed and performed with the Indian sitar player Shujaat Husain Khan and Indian tabla player Swapan Chaudhuri in the group Ghazal. Kalhor's 2004 album In the mirror of the Sky was a joint venture with the Iranian lute player Ali Akbar Moradi. His 2006 album The Wind is a collaboration with the Turkish baglama virtuoso Erdal Erzincan, with both Turkish and Persian pieces performed. At other times Kalhor has collaborated with Yo-Yo Ma's Silk Road Ensemble in the US and the Kronos Quartet.

In 1991, after having graduated from Carleton University and obtained Canadian citizenship, Kalhor moved to the United States, settling in Brooklyn, New York City, and became commercially successful. By the late 1990s, he was recording solo albums that grew into collaborations with other artists. In 2000, he was invited to Massachusetts for a collaboration with dozens of international musicians, a project which grew into the Silk Road Ensemble. Two of his works were nominated for Grammy Awards in 2004.

Kalhor returned to Iran in 2002 due to increased anti-Muslim sentiment in the US following the September 11 attacks. There, he settled in Tehran and met his partner Zohreh Soltanabadi. Although he had intended to stay in Iran, he decided to leave in the aftermath of the 2009 Iranian presidential election protests and returned to the United States with Soltanabadi, where they married and settled in Cherry Valley, California.

In 2010, Kalhor composed "I was there", which was based "on a melody attributed to Ziryab, a ninth-century Iranian musician", for a Maya Beiser concert. This piece was performed by Kalhor alongside Maya Beiser, the renowned cellist Bassam Saba, an oud player, and two percussionists, Glen Velez and Matt Kilmer.

Kalhor and Soltanabadi attempted to gain permanent residency in the United States. However, shortly after their wedding, Soltanabadi's father died and she had to return to Iran to care for her mother. For the next few years they saw each other mostly by Skype and sometimes met abroad. Kalhor eventually had his application for permanent residency granted. In 2017, Soltanabadi applied for residency in the US but was refused. That same year, Kalhor was informed that the US authorities were considering revoking his legal status as a US resident. Kalhor subsequently returned to Iran. He and Soltanabadi currently live in Tehran, but he still visits the United States to give performances.

Since 2018, he has been regularly performing with the Constantinople ensemble, alongside Kiya Tabassian, a virtuoso of the setar.

In 2019 he cancelled his Istanbul concert in Turkey due to Turkey's offensive into Rojava, Syria. In a video released on social media, Kalhor said, “A violent war has erupted in northern Syria which has made the lives of the Kurdish people much more difficult....I was scheduled to hold a concert in Istanbul, but I will cancel it out of respect for my Kurdish brothers and sisters” He has not held any concerts in Turkey since then.

== Discography ==
Album artists	Album	Release date
Kayhan Kalhor, Morteza Ayan	Eastern Apertures	1995
Ghazal	Lost Songs of the Silk Road	1997
Ghazal	As Night Falls on the Silk Road	1998
Kayhan Kalhor	Scattering Stars Like Dust	1998
Shahram Nazeri and Dastan Ensemble	Through Eternity	1999
Ghazal	Moon Rise over the Silk Road	2000
Kayhan Kalhor and Mohammad Reza Shajarian	Night, Silence, Desert	2000
Kronos Quartet	Caravan	2000
Masters of Persian Music	It's Winter	2001
Yo-Yo Ma and the Silk Road Ensemble	Silk Road Journeys: When Strangers Meet	2001
Masters of Persian Music	Without You^{†}	2002
Ghazal	The Rain^{†}	2003
Ali Akbar Moradi	In the Mirror of the Sky	2004
Masters of Persian Music	Faryad^{†}	2005
Yo-Yo Ma and the Silk Road Ensemble	Silk Road Journeys: Beyond the Horizon	2005
Kayhan Kalhor & Erdal Erzincan	The Wind	2006
Masters of Persian Music	Saze Khamoosh	2007
Masters of Persian Music	Soroude Mehr	2007
Yo-Yo Ma and the Silk Road Ensemble	New Impossibilities	2007
Kayhan Kalhor & Brooklyn Rider	Silent City	2008
Silk Road Ensemble	Off the Map^{†}	2009
Kayhan Kalhor & Madjid Khaladj	Voices of the Shades	2011
Dresdner Sinfoniker	Cinema Jenin OST	2011
Brooklyn Rider Quartet	Rhino Season OST	2012
Kayhan Kalhor & Ali Bahrami Fard	I Will Not Stand Alone	2012
Kayhan Kalhor & Erdal Erzincan	Kula Kulluk Yakişir Mi	2013
Kayhan Kalhor & Brooklyn Rider	Layers of Darkness	2014
Hawniyaz	Hawniyaz	2016
Silk Road Ensemble	The Music of Strangers^{†§}	2017
Silk Road Ensemble	Sing me home^{†§}	2017
Kayhan Kalhor & Rembrandt Frerichs Trio	It's Still Autumn	2019
Kayhan Kalhor & Toumani Diabate	The Sky is the Same colour Everywhere	2023

† Nominated for a Grammy Award

^{§} Won a Grammy Award

== See also ==
- Dastgah
- Music of Iran
