= The Wind (Kayhan Kalhor and Erdal Erzincan album) =

Studio album by Kayhan Kalhor and Erdal Erzincan
- Released: September 19, 2006
- Recorded: November 2004
- Studio: Istanbul, Turkey
- Genre: Traditional Middle Eastern Folk
- Length: 63:34
- Labels: ECM; ECM 1981
- Producers: Kayhan Kalhor, Manfred Eicher

Professional ratings
Review scores
Source	Rating
AllMusic	4/5 stars
The Guardian	4/5 stars

The Wind is an album by Iranian kamancheh player Kayhan Kalhor and Turkish bağlama player Erdal Erzincan, recorded in Istanbul in November 2004, mixed at Rainbow Studio in Oslo in 2006 and released on ECM in September later that year. It was their first collaborative album and the result is a set of instrumental compositions that flow into each other like one continuous work.

== Reception ==
Robin Denselow of The Guardian described the album as a "thoughtful, intriguing work."

== Track list ==
- All music By Kayhan Kalhor and Erdal Erzincan.
1. "Part I" - 5:45
2. "Part II" - 4:12
3. "Part III" - 4:39
4. "Part IV" - 3:42
5. "Part V" - 7:27
6. "Part VI" - 4:41
7. "Part VII" - 2:44
8. "Part VIII" - 3:58
9. "Part IX" - 5:58
10. "Part X" - 4:48
11. "Part XI" - 8:19
12. "Part XII" - 7:23

== Personnel ==
- Kayhan Kalhor – kamancheh
- Erdal Erzincan – bağlama
- Ulaş Özdemir – divan bağlama
