= Erdal Erzincan =

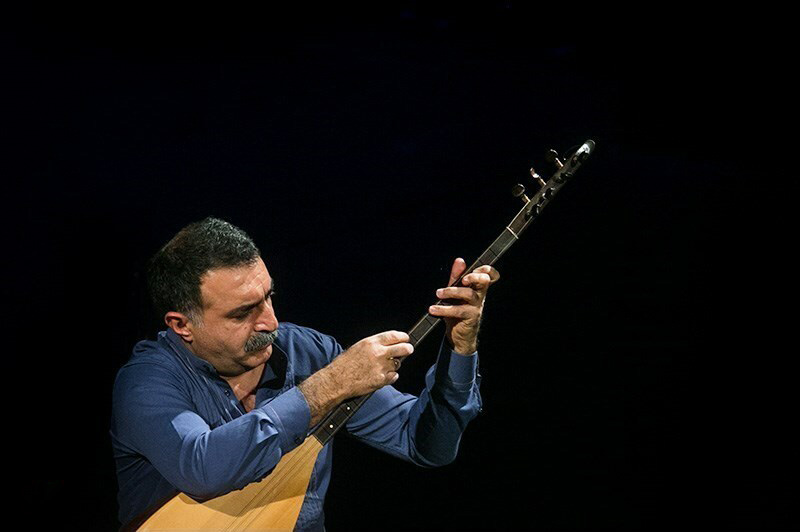

Background information
- Born: 1971 (age 54–55); Erzurum, Turkey
- Genres: Turkish folk
- Occupations: Singer-songwriter, Musician, Educator
- Instruments: Bağlama, vocals
- Years active: 1994–present
- Website: www.erdalerzincan.com.tr

Erdal Erzincan (born 1971 in Erzurum) is a Turkish Alevi folk musician, composer, and singer.

== Life and Career ==
In 1981, he moved to Istanbul and studied bağlama at the Arif Sağ music school in 1985. Since 1989, he has been studying music at Istanbul Technical University. He has contributed to the development of the şelpe technique for playing bağlama without a plectrum, akin to tapping on guitar.

During his career, he has worked with Turkish folk musicians Tolga Sağ, İsmail Özden, Yılmaz Çelik, Muharrem Temiz, Arif Sağ, and Erol Parlak. In 2004, he recorded an album with Iranian-Kurdish musician Kayhan Kalhor.

Erdal Erzincan is married to Mercan Erzincan and has one child.

== Discography ==
- Gurup Arayış (1992)
- Töre (1994)
- Garip (1996)
- Türküler Sevdamız (1997) – With İsmail Özden and Tolga Sağ
- Concerto For Bağlama (1998) – Instrumental – With Arif Sağ and Erol Parlak
- Gurbet Yollarında (1999)
- Anadolu (2000) – Instrumental
- Türküler Sevdamız 2 (2001) – With Tolga Sağ and Yılmaz Çelik
- Al Mendil (2002)
- Türküler Sevdamız 3 (2005) – Together with Tolga Sağ, Muharrem Temiz and Yılmaz Çelik
- Kervan (2006)
- The Wind (ECM, 2006) – Instrumental, with Kayhan Kalhor
- Giriftar (2008)
- Girdab-ı Mihnet (2011)
- Erdal Erzincan Bağlama Orkestrası (2013)
- Kula Kulluk Yakışır Mı (ECM, 2013) with Kayhan Kalhor
- Karasu (2016) – Instrumental
- Döngü (2018)
- Bağlama İçin Besteler (2019)
- Beş Bağlama Konserleri (2019)
- Şelpe (2019) – Instrumental
- İki Telin İzinden (2020)
- Ağaçname (2022)
