= Kaunas Jazz =

Jazz-Festival in Lithuania

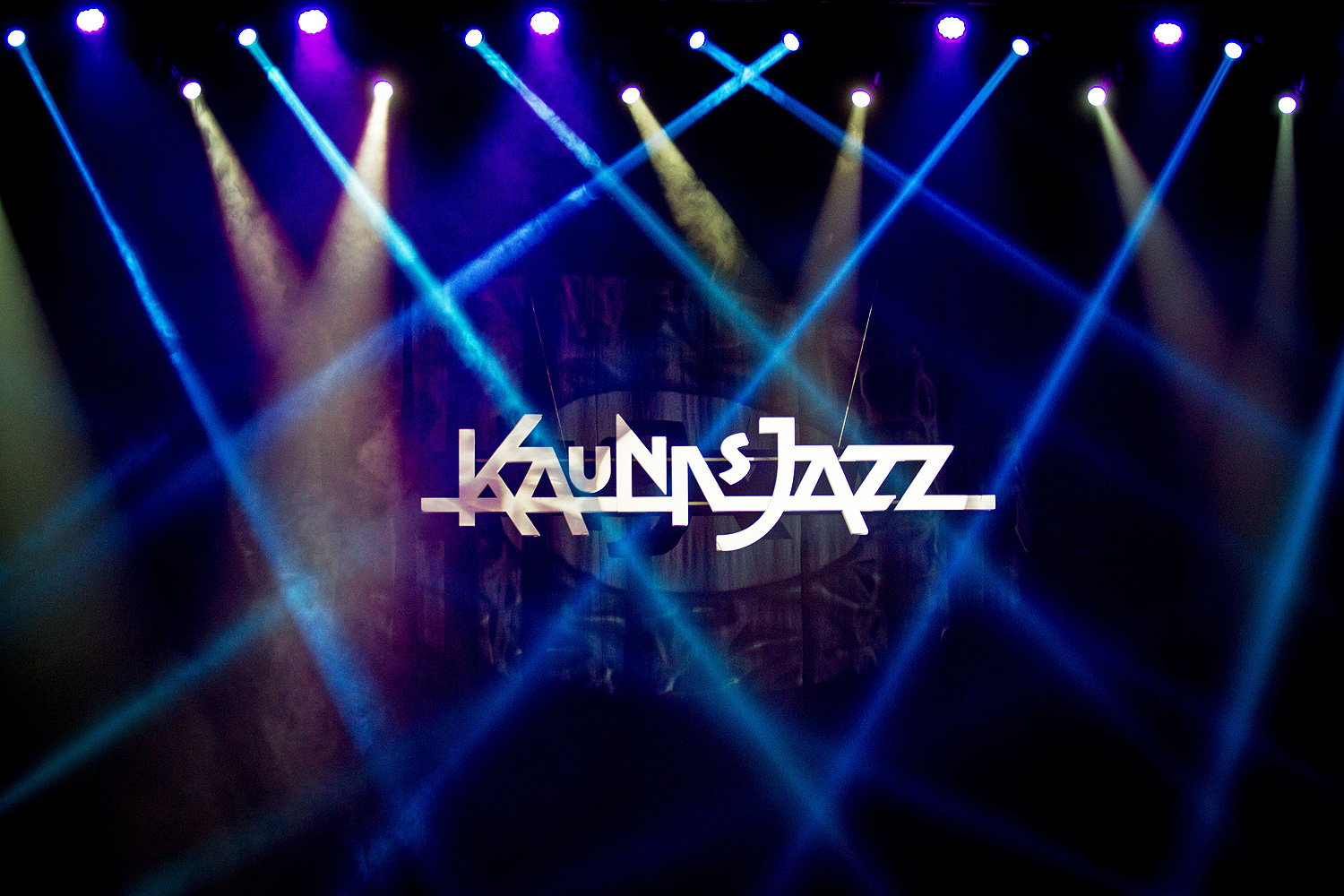

Kaunas Jazz is an annual international jazz festival in Kaunas, Lithuania. It started in 1991, soon after Lithuania declared re-establishment of independence from the Soviet Union, and is now the largest jazz festival in Lithuania. In the beginning it was held only in the spring (late April), but it now features a small series in fall and another series just before Christmas. The festival includes many different styles and genres of jazz.

Artists from over 20 countries have participated in the festival, including Al Di Meola, John Scofield, Niels-Henning Ørsted Pedersen, Elvin Jones, Jan Garbarek, Charles Lloyd, Bobo Stenson, Nils Landgren, Courtney Pine, Marc Copland, John Abercrombie, Palle Mikkelborg, Nils Petter Molvaer, David Sanborn, Mike Stern, Trilok Gurtu, Bobby Previte, Greg Osby, and Chico Freeman.

== History ==
The festival started in 1991, soon after Lithuania declared re-establishment of independence from the Soviet Union. The event was held over three days in April. Kaunas Jazz is the largest jazz festival in Lithuania. In the beginning it was held only in the spring (late April), but it now features a small series in fall and another series just before Christmas. The festival includes many different styles and genres of jazz.

Artists from over 20 countries have participated in the festival, including Al Di Meola, John Scofield, Niels-Henning Ørsted Pedersen, Elvin Jones, Jan Garbarek, Charles Lloyd, Bobo Stenson, Nils Landgren, Courtney Pine, Marc Copland, John Abercrombie, Palle Mikkelborg, Nils Petter Molvaer, David Sanborn, Mike Stern, Trilok Gurtu, Bobby Previte, Greg Osby, and Chico Freeman.

Kauno miesto muziejaus reports that Lithuanian saxophonist Petras Vyšniauskas is the only artist to have participated in all the festivals.
