= Kiya Tabassian =

Iranian musician, singer, and composer

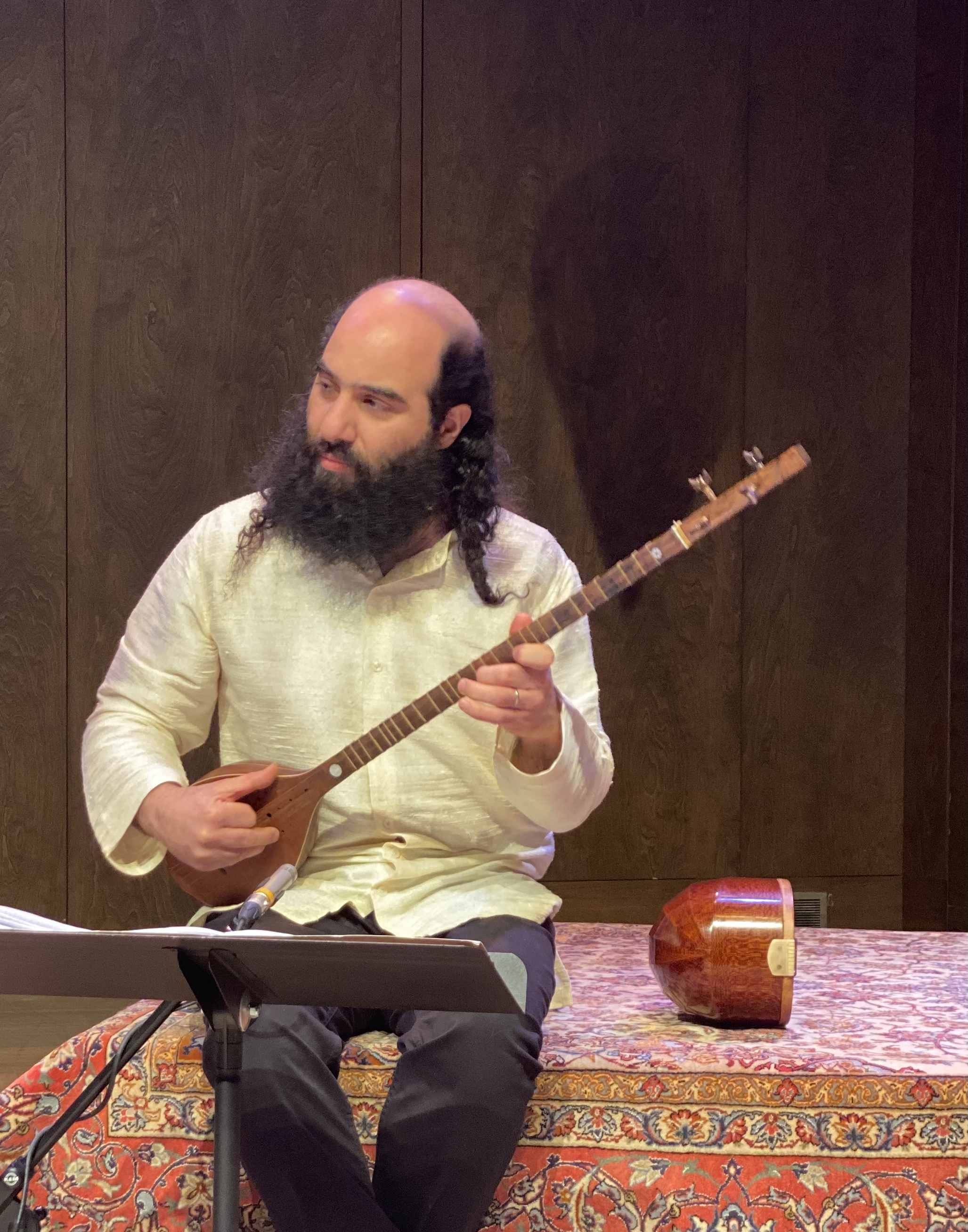

Background information
- Born: August 11, 1976 (age 50); Tehran, Iran
- Genres: World music, Persian music, Ancient music, Baroque music
- Occupations: Musician and composer
- Instrument: Setar
- Years active: 2001–present
- Labels: ATMA Classique, Glossa, Analekta
- Member of: Constantinople
- Website: www.constantinople.ca/en

Kiya Tabassian (born on August 11, 1976, in Tehran) is an Iranian musician, singer, and composer. He moved to Canada in 1990 and created the musical ensemble Constantinople, assuming the roles of both artistic director and composer. Constantinople includes the interplay between Persian musical traditions and a variety of global styles.

== Early life and education ==
Tabassian was born and raised in Iran. At the age of 12, he learned the setâr, a traditional Persian string instrument. This led him to play and reinterpret pieces from traditional Persian music during his formative years. At the age of 14, he moved to Montreal, Canada, with his parents and two brothers. At the Conservatoire de musique de Montréal, he studied music alongside Reza Ghassemi, Kayhan Kalhor, and Gilles Tremblay.

== Musical career ==
Kiya Tabassian founded the Constantinople ensemble in 1998 and has been its artistic director ever since. From 2002 to 2005, Tabassian was part of the research group on the history of Mediterranean music in the international MediMuses project and collaborated on various recording endeavours. Tabassian has also contributed to the Montreal Symphony Orchestra, the Nouvel Ensemble Moderne, Bradyworks, and the European Broadcasting Union.

He has composed music for documentary films such as Jabaroot and Voices of the Unheard. In 2015, Tabassian initiated and directed a residency program at the Banff Center for the Arts. The following year, he contributed his vocals to the soundtrack of the video game Assassin's Creed: Origins. Kiya has performed at the World Music Institute in New York, the Yerba Buena Center for the Arts, Megaron Mousikis in Athens, and Chicago's World Music Festival.

In 2017, as part of Montreal's 375th anniversary, Tabassian composed the anthem Mémoires d'Ahuntsic, which was presented as a gift to Ahuntsic. That same year, he co-founded the Centre des musiciens du monde in Montreal with ethnomusicologist Frédéric Léotar, where he served as artistic director and oversaw the "Centre des musiciens du monde" record collection on the Analekta label until 2022.

In 2020, Tabassian co-authored, alongside poet Hélène Dorion, the musical and poetic suite "Le temps des forêts", based on life stories collected from residents of LTCHs in Montreal. Having spent seven years on the Conseil des arts de Montréal, where he presided over the music decision-making committee for three years, Tabassian joined the Board of Directors of the Conseil des arts et des lettres du Québec in 2023. He was also commissioned by the Conseil québécois de la musique to lead a reflection committee on the role of world music in the realm of concert music.

== Discography ==
- Musique du Moyen Âge et de la Renaissance, Atma Classique
- Memoria Sefardí – Musique d'Espagne juive et chrétienne, Atma Classique
- Li Tans Nouveaus – troubadours (Châtelain de Coucy, Li nouviauz tanz et mais et violete, Anne Azéma), Atma Classique
- De Castille à Samarkand, with Guy Ross, Atma Classique
- Grèce – Carrefour de la Méditerranée, with En Chordais, Atma Classique
- Que le Yable les emporte, with Bernard Simard, Atma Classique
- Terres Turquoises, La princessa y el caballero, Françoise Atlan, Atma Classique
- Mania, Atma Classique
- Terra nostra, José Ángel Gutiérrez, Teresita de Jesús Islas, Atma Classique
- Ay Amor, with Françoise Atlan, Atma Classique
- Premiers Songes, poems by Sor Juana Inés de la Cruz, Analekta
- Metamorfosi, Italian Baroque, Analekta
- The Musical Voyages of Marco Polo, with En Chordais, World Village
- Jardins migrateurs, Persian and Mandingo music, Analekta
- Horizons lointains, with Belem, Kora and Ko
- Traversées, with Ablaye Cissoko, Kora and Ko
- …Cette ville étrange, Dreyer Gaido
- La porta d'oriente, with Marco Beasley, Glossa
- In the Footsteps of Rumi, with Ghalia Benali, Glossa
- Il Ponte di Leonardo, with Marco Beasley, Note 1 Music GmbH
- Pilgrimage, with Cappella Mariana, Supraphon
- Nordic Lights in Persian Sky, with Benedicte Maurseth, Glossa
- Estuaire, with Ablaye Cissoko, Ma Case
- Dialogos, with Holland Baroque, Pentatone
- Clair-obscur, with A Filetta, Constantinople
