= Silkroad (arts organization) =

Non-profit organization

Silkroad, formerly the Silk Road Project, Inc., is a not-for-profit organization, initiated by the cellist Yo-Yo Ma in 1998, promoting collaboration among artists and institutions, promoting multicultural artistic exchange, and studying the ebb and flow of ideas. The project was first inspired by the cultural traditions of the historical Eurasian Silk Road trade routes and now encompasses a number of artistic, cultural and educational programs focused on connecting people and ideas from around the world. It has been described as an "arts and educational organization that connects musicians, composers, artists and audiences around the world" and "an initiative to promote multicultural artistic collaboration."

In July 2020, Rhiannon Giddens took over from Yo-Yo Ma as artistic director.

== Recent events ==
In 2009, Silkroad began an educational pilot program for middle-school students in New York City public schools. The Silk Road Connect program focuses on passion-driven education through arts integration and is being developed with help from education experts at the Harvard Graduate School of Education. In July 2012, Silkroad and Harvard Graduate School of Education presented "The Arts and Passion-Driven Learning," an arts education institute that modeled the Silk Road Connect arts integration approach. The program has continued each year since.

In celebration of its 10th anniversary, Silkroad presented performances and programs by the Silk Road Ensemble in North America, Asia and Europe from 2008 to 2010. Its anniversary season began with the Silk Road Ensemble's performance with Yo-Yo Ma of the United Nations Day Concert in October 2008. Tenth-anniversary activities also included a North American concert tour by the Silk Road Ensemble with Yo-Yo Ma in March 2009, which featured the North American premiere of Layla and Majnun, a chamber arrangement for the Silk Road Ensemble of a traditional Azerbaijani opera.

The organization has published a book, Along the Silk Road, and commissioned more than 70 new chamber music compositions. Silkroad has also created educational materials entitled "Silk Road Encounters" and has partnered with the Stanford Program on International and Cross-Cultural Education (SPICE) to produce Along the Silk Road, a curriculum for students in grades six-10, and The Road to Beijing, a documentary made available with related lessons about Beijing in advance of the 2008 Summer Olympic Games.

== Partnerships ==
Silkroad is affiliated with Harvard University; the organization moved its offices to the Harvard campus in Boston, Massachusetts, in July 2010, at the outset of a renewed five-year affiliation with the University designed to enable new artistic and cultural opportunities at Harvard and in surrounding communities. Silkroad has been affiliated with both Harvard University and the Rhode Island School of Design in the USA, where the Silk Road Ensemble engaged with faculty and students in annual residencies. Silkroad's partnership with the Rhode Island School of Design took place from 2005 through 2010. As part of Silkroad programming, the Silk Road Ensemble has also been involved in short-term residencies at Museum Rietberg in Zurich, Switzerland; The Art Institute of Chicago; University of California, Santa Barbara; Rubin Museum of Art in New York City; Nara National Museum in Nara, Japan; the Peabody Essex Museum in Salem, Massachusetts; and the Aga Khan Museum in Toronto.

== The Music of Strangers ==
The Music of Strangers: Yo-Yo Ma and the Silk Road Ensemble is a documentary film about Silkroad directed by Morgan Neville. The film was released in U.S. theaters starting in June 2016. The Orchard has acquired all worldwide rights to the film with the exception of U.S. domestic television rights, which HBO has acquired. Reviews of the documentary included: Rotten Tomatoes 85%; Washington Post 3/4; and, 7/10 IMDb.

== The Silk Road Ensemble ==
Silk Road Journeys: Beyond the Horizon

The Silk Road Ensemble is a musical collective and a part of Silkroad. The ensemble is not a fixed group of musicians, but rather a loose collective of as many as 59 musicians, composers, arrangers, visual artists and storytellers from Eurasian cultures.

The Ensemble has regularly commissioned new works from across a broad musical spectrum, including works by Zhao Jiping and Dmitri Yanov-Yanovsky, and is known for its series of interdisciplinary festivals and residencies presented in North America, Europe, and Asia. They have performed in many locations along the historic Silk Road, including Iran, Armenia, Azerbaijan, Kazakhstan, India, the Kyrgyz Republic and Tajikistan.

The Ensemble uses various instruments from the Silk Road region, including a pipa, a Chinese short-necked plucked lute; a duduk, an Armenian double reed woodwind; a Shakuhachi, a Japanese bamboo flute; and a morin khuur, a Mongolian horse head fiddle; among many others.

=== Discography ===
The Silk Road Ensemble has recorded ten CDs. The group's 2009 CD Off the Map was nominated in the Best Classical Crossover Album category at the 53rd Grammy Awards in 2011. Their 2016 CD Sing Me Home won Best World Music Album at the 59th Grammy Awards in 2017.

- 2001 - Silk Road Journey: When Strangers Meet
- 2005 - Silk Road Journeys: Beyond the Horizon (released earlier in Japan in 2004 titled Enchantment)
- 2007 - New Impossibilities
- 2008 - Traditions and Transformations: Sounds of Silk Road Chicago
- 2009 - Off the Map
- 2013 - A Playlist Without Borders
- 2016 - Sing Me Home
- 2017 - The Vietnam War: A Film By Ken Burns & Lynn Novick [soundtrack]
- 2020 - Falling Out of Time
- 2024 - American Railroad

=== Members ===
In addition to Ma, performing members of the ensemble include:

- Siamak Aghaei - santur/composer
- Edward Arron - cello
- Kinan Azmeh - clarinet
- Jeffrey Beecher - double bass
- Mike Block - cello
- Nicholas Cords - viola
- Gevorg Dabaghyan - duduk
- Sandeep Das - tabla/composer
- Joel Fan - piano
- Haruka Fujii - percussion
- Jonathan Gandelsman - violin
- Joseph Gramley - percussion/composer
- Ben Haggarty - storyteller
- He Cui - sheng
- Hu Jianbing - sheng, bawu
- Rauf Islamov - kamancheh
- Colin Jacobsen - violin/composer
- Siamak Jahangiry - ney
- Kayhan Kalhor - kamancheh/composer
- Ganbaatar Khongorzul - urtiin duu (long song)
- Dong-Won Kim - janggo, vocals/composer
- Ji Hyun Kim - kayagum, vocals
- You-Young Kim - viola
- Li Hui - pipa
- Liu Lin - sanxian
- Ali Asgar Mammadov - tar
- Max Mandel - viola
- Gulia Mashurova - harp
- Kevork Mourad - visual artist
- Cristina Pato - Galician bagpipe /composer
- Alim Qasimov - mugham vocals
- Farghana Qasimova - mugham vocals
- Bassam Saba - oud, ney/composer
- Shane Shanahan - percussion/composer
- Mark Suter - percussion/composer
- Kojiro Umezaki - shakuhachi/composer
- Wu Man - pipa
- Wu Tong - sheng, bawu/composer
- Betti Xiang - erhu
- Yang Wei - pipa
- DaXun Zhang - double bass
- Reylon Yount - yangqin
- Jason Duckles - Cello

Silk Road Ensemble composers and arrangers include:

- Rabih Abou-Khalil
- Christopher Adler
- Franghiz Ali-Zadeh
- Jia Daqun
- Gabriela Lena Frank
- Osvaldo Golijov
- Jeeyoung Kim
- Glenn Kotche
- Angel Lam
- Alisher Latif-Zadeh
- Ljova (Lev Zhurbin)
- Nurlanbek Nyshanov
- Sangidorjiin Sansargereltekh
- Vache Sharafyan
- Byambasuren Sharav
- Giovanni Sollima
- Dmitri Yanov-Yanovsky
- Zhao Jiping
- Zhao Lin
- Evan Ziporyn

== Silk Road Chicago ==
Silk Road Chicago was a citywide celebration, from June 2006 to June 2007, with special events, performances, and exhibitions that explored cross-cultural discovery and celebrated the artistic legacy of the historic Silk Road. Silk Road Chicago was a partnership among Silkroad, the Chicago Department of Cultural Affairs and the Chicago Office of Tourism, Chicago Symphony Orchestra, and The Art Institute of Chicago.
