= Donna and Marvin Schwartz Center for Performing Arts =

Arts facility in Georgia, United States

Coordinates: 33.789777°N 84.321249°W

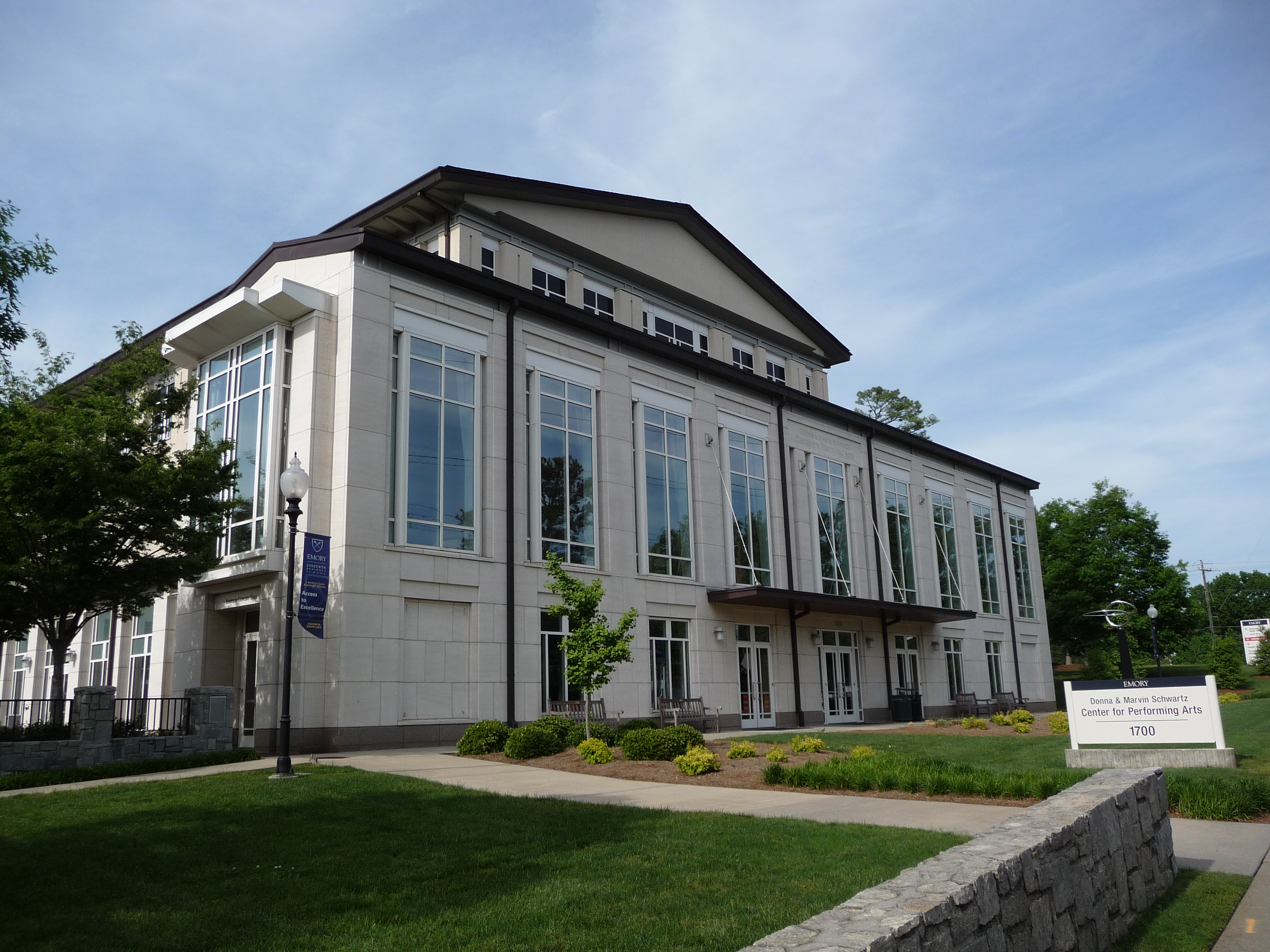
Donna and Marvin Schwartz Center for Performing Arts

The Donna & Marvin Schwartz Center for Performing Arts is a 90,000-square-foot (8,400 m^{2}) multi-discipline performing arts facility on the campus of Emory University in Atlanta, Georgia, United States. Completed in early 2003, the Schwartz Center provides a multidisciplinary teaching and performance center for the performing arts programs at Emory including dance, music, and theater. The centerpiece of the center is the 825-seat Cherry Logan Emerson Concert Hall featuring a custom-built Daniel Jaeckel Opus 45 pipe organ with fifty-four stops and 3,605 pipes in a cherry-wood case. The concert hall was designed in part by renowned acousticians Kirkegaard and Associates. The $36.9 million structure was designed by lead architect Michael Dennis in association with Howard-Montgomery-Steger and Smallwood, Reynolds, Stewart, Stewart.

== Design ==
The Schwartz Center occupies a prominent site at the southwest corner of Emory's campus at the intersection of North Decatur Road and Clifton Road. The architectural style and exterior materials were chosen to echo existing buildings on campus. The nearby Goizueta Business School influenced the primary exterior finish which is a stucco accented by a Portuguese limestone known as cietra bella at the building's entrances.

The architects studied venues including Boston's Symphony Hall and Vienna's Musikverein when designing the center.

The Center's main hall is the 825-seat Cherry Logan Emerson Concert Hall, a tall, narrow shoebox concert hall design that rises above the roofline of the main building and is articulated with clerestory windows. Emerson Hall is in the southernmost section of the complex and its two-story lobby addresses North Decatur Road and the off-campus community beyond.

The Center also houses two major teaching and performance spaces for theater and dance. The 109-seat dance studio has a Harlequin floor which is the only of its kind in Atlanta, and is the only space in Atlanta that is solely used for dance. The theater lab is a working space, it can be configured in many different ways depending on the performance, and at most seats approximately 70 people. There is also a theater observatory where students can view and discuss what is happening below in the theater lab.

The Tharp Rehearsal Hall is used for major ensemble rehearsals, and is designed to mimic the breadth and height of a concert hall and stage so students can gain real performance experience.

There are classrooms in the lower level of the Center known as "smart" classrooms. They are wired with equipment for multimedia and other presentations.
