= List of Grammy Award winners and nominees by country and territory =

The following is a list of Grammy Award winners and nominees by country and territory:

== Argentina ==
- List of Argentine Grammy Award winners and nominees

== Australia ==
- List of Australian Grammy Award winners

== Austria ==
- List of Austrian Grammy Award winners and nominees

== Azerbaijan ==
Year	Category	Nominees(s)	Nominated for	Result
2017	Best World Music Album	Yo-Yo Ma & The Silk Road Ensemble (Note: Franghiz Alizadeh and Alim Qasimov were two members of a large musical collective, who performed on the album.)	Sing Me Home	Won

== Barbados ==
Year	Award	Nominees	Recipient	Result
2008	Record of the Year	Rihanna	"Umbrella" (feat. Jay-Z)	Nominated
2008	Best Rap/Sung Collaboration	Rihanna	"Umbrella" (feat. Jay-Z)	Won
2008	Best Dance Recording	Rihanna	"Don't Stop the Music"	Nominated
2008	Best R&B Performance by a Duo or Group with Vocals	Rihanna	"Hate That I Love You" (feat. Ne-Yo)	Nominated
2009	Best Pop Collaboration with Vocals	Rihanna	"If I Never See Your Face Again" (w/ Maroon 5)	Nominated
2009	Best Dance Recording	Rihanna	"Disturbia"	Nominated
2009	Best Long Form Music Video	Rihanna	Good Girl Gone Bad Live	Nominated
2010	Best Rap Song	Rihanna	"Run This Town" (w/ Jay-Z & Kanye West)	Won
2010	Best Rap/Sung Collaboration	Rihanna	"Run This Town" (w/ Jay-Z & Kanye West)	Won
2011	Best Rap/Sung Collaboration	Rihanna	"Love the Way You Lie" (w/ Eminem)	Nominated
2011	Record of the Year	Rihanna	"Love the Way You Lie" (w/ Eminem)	Nominated
2011	Best Short Form Music Video	Rihanna	"Love the Way You Lie" (w/ Eminem)	Nominated
2011	Best Dance Recording	Rihanna	"Only Girl (In the World)"	Won
2011	Album of the Year	Rihanna	Recovery (as featured artist)	Nominated
2012	Album of the Year	Rihanna	Loud	Nominated
2012	Best Pop Vocal Album	Rihanna	Loud	Nominated
2012	Best Rap/Sung Collaboration	Rihanna	"What's My Name?" (feat. Drake)	Nominated
2012	Best Rap/Sung Collaboration	Rihanna	"All of the Lights" (w/ Kanye West, Kid Cudi & Fergie)	Won
2013	Best Rap/Sung Collaboration	Rihanna	"Talk That Talk" (feat. Jay-Z)	Nominated
2013	Best Pop Solo Performance	Rihanna	"Where Have You Been"	Nominated
2013	Best Short Form Music Video	Rihanna	"We Found Love" (feat. Calvin Harris)	Won
2014	Best Pop Duo/Group Performance	Rihanna	"Stay" (feat. Mikky Ekko)	Nominated
2014	Best Urban Contemporary Album	Rihanna	Unapologetic	Won
2015	Best Rap/Sung Collaboration	Rihanna	"The Monster" (w/ Eminem)	Won
2017	Record of the Year	Rihanna	"Work" (feat. Drake)	Nominated
2017	Best Pop Duo/Group Performance	Rihanna	"Work" (feat. Drake)	Nominated
2017	Best R&B Performance	Rihanna	"Needed Me"	Nominated
2017	Best R&B Song	Rihanna	"Kiss It Better"	Nominated
2017	Best Urban Contemporary Album	Rihanna	Anti	Nominated
2017	Best Recording Package	Rihanna	Anti	Nominated
2017	Album of the Year	Rihanna	Views (as featured artist)	Nominated
2017	Best Rap/Sung Performance	Rihanna	"Famous" (w/ Kanye West & Swizz Beatz)	Nominated
2018	Best Rap/Sung Performance	Rihanna	"Loyalty" (w/ Kendrick Lamar)	Won

== Belgium ==
Year	Category	Nominees(s)	Nominated for	Result
1964	Record of the Year	The Singing Nun	Dominique	Nominated
1964	Best Vocal Performance, Female	The Singing Nun	Dominique	Nominated
1964	Best Gospel or Other Religious Recording (Musical)	The Singing Nun	Dominique	Won
1964	Album of the Year (other than classical)	The Singing Nun	The Singing Nun	Nominated
1964	Grammy Award for Best Instrumental Theme	Toots Thielemans	Bluesette	Nominated
1980	Grammy Award for Best Jazz Instrumental Performance, Group	Toots Thielemans	Affinity	Nominated
1992	Best Jazz Instrumental Solo	Toots Thielemans	Bluesette	Nominated
1995	Best World Music Album	Zap Mama	Sabsylma	Nominated
2013	Record of the Year	Gotye (Note: Gotye is born in Belgium, but was raised in Australia.)	Somebody That I Used to Know	Won
2013	Best Pop Duo/Group Performance	Gotye	Somebody That I Used to Know	Won
2013	Best Alternative Music Album	Gotye	Making Mirrors	Won
2014	Best Large Jazz Ensemble Album	Brussels Jazz Orchestra	Wild Beauty	Nominated
2019	Best Remixed Recording	Soulwax	"Work It (Soulwax Remix)" by Marie Davidson	Nominated

== Brazil ==
- List of Brazilian Grammy Award winners and nominees

== Cameroon ==
Year	Nominees	Category	Nominated for	Result
2003 (Note: As a member of the Pat Metheny Group)	Richard Bona	Best Pop Instrumental Performance	"As It Is"	Nominated
2003	Richard Bona	Best Contemporary Jazz Album	Speaking of Now	Won
2007	Richard Bona	Best Contemporary World Music Album	Tiki	Nominated

== Canada ==
- List of Canadian Grammy Award winners and nominees

== Cape Verde ==
Year	Category	Nominees(s)	Nominated for	Result
1996	Best World Music Album	Cesaria Evora	Cesaria Evora	Nominated
1998	Best World Music Album	Cesaria Evora	Cabo Verde	Nominated
1999	Best World Music Album	Cesaria Evora	Miss Perfumado	Nominated
2000	Best World Music Album	Cesaria Evora	Café Atlantico	Nominated
2002	Best World Music Album	Cesaria Evora	São Vicente	Nominated
2004	Best Contemporary World Music Album	Cesaria Evora	Voz D'Amor	Won

== Chile ==
Year	Category	Nominees(s)	Nominated for	Result
2001	Best Latin Rock, Urban or Alternative Album	La Ley	Uno	Won
2011	Best Latin Rock, Urban or Alternative Album	Ana Tijoux	1977	Lost
2013	Best Latin Rock, Urban or Alternative Album	Ana Tijoux	La Bala	Lost
2020	Best Improvised Jazz Solo	Melissa Aldana	Elsewhere	Lost

== China ==
Year	Category	Nominee(s)	Nominated for	Result
1997	Best World Music Album	Jiebing Chen	Tabula Rasa	Nominated
2015	Best World Music Album	Wu Man	Our World in Song	Nominated
2016	Best Opera Recording	Guanqun Yu	Corigliano: The Ghosts Of Versailles	Won
2017	Best World Music Album	Yo-Yo Ma and The Silk Road Ensemble	Sing Me Home	Won

== Cuba ==
- List of Cuban Grammy Award winners and nominees

== France ==
- List of French Grammy Award winners and nominees

== Germany ==
- List of Germany Grammy Award winners and nominees

== Iceland ==
Year	Category	Nominee(s)	Nominated for	Result
1994	Best Music Video, Short Form	Björk	"Human Behaviour"	Nominated
1996	Best Music Video, Short Form	Björk	"It's Oh So Quiet"	Nominated
1996	Best Alternative Music Performance	Björk	Post	Nominated
1998	Best Alternative Music Performance	Björk	Homogenic	Nominated
1999	Best Music Video, Short Form	Björk	"Bachelorette"	Nominated
2000	Best Music Video, Short Form	Björk	"All Is Full of Love"	Nominated
2001	Best Pop Instrumental Performance	Björk	"Overture"	Nominated
2001	Best Pop Instrumental Arrangement Accompanying A Vocalist(s)	Björk	"I've Seen It All"	Nominated
2002	Best Alternative Music Album	Björk	Vespertine	Nominated
2004	Best Boxed or Special Limited Edition Package	Gabríela Friðriksdóttir (shared with Mathias Augustyniak and Michael Amzalag)	Family Tree	Nominated
2004	Best Alternative Music Album	Sigur Rós	( )	Nominated
2005	Best Female Pop Vocal Performance	Björk	"Oceania"	Nominated
2005	Best Alternative Music Album	Björk	Medúlla	Nominated
2008	Best Alternative Music Album	Björk	Volta	Nominated
2009	Best Orchestral Performance	Iceland Symphony Orchestra (conducted by Rumon Gamba)	D'Indy: Orchestral Works, Vol. 1	Nominated
2013	Best Alternative Music Album	Björk	Biophilia	Nominated
2016	Best Alternative Music Album	Björk	Vulnicura	Nominated
2016	Best Score Soundtrack for Visual Media	Jóhann Jóhannsson	The Theory of Everything	Nominated
2018	Best Score Soundtrack for Visual Media	Jóhann Jóhannsson	Arrival	Nominated
2019	Best Alternative Music Album	Björk	Utopia	Nominated
2020	Best Score Soundtrack for Visual Media	Hildur Guðnadóttir	Chernobyl	Won
2021	Best Score Soundtrack for Visual Media	Hildur Guðnadóttir	Joker	Won
2021	Best Arrangement, Instrumental or A Cappella	Hildur Guðnadóttir	Joker (for "Bathroom Dance")	Nominated
2021	Best Orchestral Performance	Daníel Bjarnason and Iceland Symphony Orchestra	Concurrence	Nominated
2022	Best Opera Recording	Dísella Lárusdóttir	Glass: Akhnaten	Won
2022	Best Dance/Electronic Recording	Ólafur Arnalds	"Loom"	Nominated
2022	Best Arrangement, Instrumental and Vocals	Ólafur Arnalds	"The Bottom Line"	Nominated
2023	Best Alternative Music Album	Björk	Fossora	Nominated
2024	Best New Age, Ambient or Chant Album	Ólafur Arnalds	Some Kind of Peace (Piano Reworks)	Nominated
2024	Best Traditional Pop Vocal Album	Laufey	Bewitched	Won
2025	Best Classical Instrumental Solo	Víkingur Ólafsson	J.S. Bach: Goldberg Variations	Won
2026	Best Traditional Pop Vocal Album	Laufey	A Matter of Time	Won

== India ==
- List of Indian Grammy Award winners and nominees

== Indonesia ==
Year	Category	Nominee(s)	Nominated for	Result
2015	Best Improvised Jazz Solo	Joey Alexander	"Giant Steps"	Nominated
2015	Best Jazz Instrumental Album	Joey Alexander	My Favorite Things	Nominated
2016	Best Improvised Jazz Solo	Joey Alexander	"Countdown"	Nominated

== Iran ==
Year	Category	Nominees(s)	Nominated for	Result
1993	Best World Music Album	Strunz & Farah (Note: Ardeshir Farah was a member of a music group.)	Americas (Album)	Nominated
2001	Best Remixer of the Year, Non-Classical	Deep Dish	Deep Dish	Nominated
2002	Best Remixed Recording, Non-Classical	Deep Dish	Thank You	Won
2004	Best Traditional World Music Album	Ghazal (Note: Kayhan Kalhor was a member of a musical collective, who performed on the album.)	The Rain	Nominated
2004	Best Traditional World Music Album	Masters of Persian Music (Note: Mohammad Reza Shajarian, Hossein Alizadeh, Kayhan Kalhor and Homayoun Shajarian were members of a musical collective, who performed on the album.)	Without You	Nominated
2006	Best Dance Recording	Deep Dish	Say Hello	Nominated
2006	Best Traditional World Music Album	Masters of Persian Music	Faryad	Nominated
2007	Best Traditional World Music Album	Hossein Alizadeh and Djivan Gasparyan	Endless Vision	Nominated
2009	Best Score Soundtrack for Motion Picture, Television or Other Visual Media	Ramin Djawadi	Iron Man	Nominated
2017	Best World Music Album	Yo-Yo Ma & The Silk Road Ensemble (Note: Kayhan Kalhor was a member of a musical collective, who performed on the album.)	Sing Me Home	Won
2018	Best Score Soundtrack for Motion Picture, Television or Other Visual Media	Ramin Djawadi	Game of Thrones	Nominated
2019	Best New Age Album	Opium Moon (Note: Hamid Saeidi was a member of a musical collective, who performed on the album.)	Opium Moon	Won
2020	Best Score Soundtrack for Motion Picture, Television or Other Visual Media	Ramin Djawadi	Game of Thrones	Nominated
2022	Best R&B Album	Snoh Aalegra	Temporary Highs in the Violet Skies	Nominated
2022	Best R&B Performance	Snoh Aalegra	Lost You	Nominated
2022	Best New Age Album	Opium Moon	Night + Day	Nominated
2023	Best Traditional R&B Performance	Snoh Aalegra	Do 4 Love	Nominated
2023	Best Song for Social Change	Shervin Hajipour	Baraye	Won

== Ireland ==
- List of Irish Grammy Award winners and nominees

== Italy ==
- List of Italian Grammy Award winners and nominees

== Japan ==
- List of Japanese Grammy Award winners and nominees

== Kazakhstan ==
Year	Category	Nominees(s)	Nominated for	Result
2020	Best Remixed Recording	Imanbek	Roses (Imanbek Remix)	Won

== Lebanon ==
Year	Category	Nominees(s)	Nominated for	Result
2008	Best Dance/Electronic Recording	Mika	Love Today	Nominated
2017	Best World Music Album	Yo-Yo Ma & The Silk Road Ensemble (Note: Rabih Abou Khalil was a member of a large musical collective, who performed on the album.)	Sing Me Home	Won
2022	Best Global Music Album	Ibrahim Maalouf	Queen of Sheba	Nominated

== Malaysia ==
Year	Category	Nominees(s)	Nominated for	Result
2000	Album of the Year	Phil Tan (record engineer, mixer and producer)	FanMail, performed by TLC	Nominated
2002	Best Musical Album for Children	Ani Zonneveld (composer, producer) (Note: was a member of a large musical collective, who performed on the album.)	Big Wide Grin , performed by Keb' Mo'	Nominated
2005	Album of the Year	Phil Tan (record engineer, mixer and producer)	Confessions, performed by Usher	Nominated
2005	Best Contemporary Blues Album	Ani Zonneveld (composer, producer)	Keep It Simple, performed by Keb' Mo'	Won
2006	Record of the Year	Phil Tan (record engineer, mixer and producer)	We Belong Together, performed by Mariah Carey	Nominated
2006	Record of the Year	Phil Tan (record engineer, mixer and producer)	Hollaback Girl performed by Gwen Stefani	Nominated
2006	Album of the Year	Phil Tan (record engineer, mixer and producer)	Love. Angel. Music. Baby., performed by Gwen Stefani	Nominated
2006	Album of the Year	Phil Tan (record engineer, mixer and producer)	The Emancipation of Mimi, performed by Mariah Carey	Nominated
2006	Best Contemporary R&B Album	Phil Tan (record engineer, mixer and producer)	The Emancipation of Mimi, performed by Mariah Carey	Won
2007	Best Rap Album	Phil Tan (record engineer, mixer and producer)	Release Therapy, performed by Ludacris	Won
2008	Best Dance Recording	Phil Tan (record engineer, mixer and producer)	Don't Stop The Music, performed by Rihanna	Nominated
2009	Record of the Year	Phil Tan (record engineer, mixer and producer)	Bleeding Love , performed by Leona Lewis	Nominated
2009	Album of the Year	Phil Tan (record engineer, mixer and producer)	Year of the Gentleman, performed by Ne-Yo	Nominated
2009	Best Dance Recording	Phil Tan (record engineer, mixer and producer)	Disturbia , performed by Rihanna	Nominated
2011	Best Dance Recording	Phil Tan (record engineer, mixer and producer)	Only Girl (In The World), performed by Rihanna	Won
2011	Album of the Year	Phil Tan (record engineer, mixer and producer)	Teenage Dream, performed by Katy Perry	Nominated
2012	Album of the Year	Phil Tan (record engineer, mixer and producer)	Loud , performed by Rihanna	Nominated
2012	Record of the Year	Phil Tan (record engineer, mixer and producer)	Firework, performed by Katy Perry	Nominated
2025	Best Contemporary Blues Album	Lyia Meta (composer, producer)	The Fury , performed by Antonio Vergara	Nominated

== Mali ==
- List of Malian Grammy Award winners and nominees

== Mexico ==
- List of Mexican Grammy Award winners and nominees

== Mongolia ==
Year	Category	Nominees(s)	Nominated for	Result
2017	Best World Music Album	Yo-Yo Ma & The Silk Road Ensemble (Note: Ganbaataryn Khongorzul, Byambasuren Sharav and Sangidorjiin Sansargereltekh were members of a large musical collective, who performed on the album.)	Sing Me Home	Won

== Morocco ==
Year	Category	Nominees(s)	Nominated for	Result
2009	Best Dance Recording	Redone	Just Dance	Nominated
2010	Best Dance/Electronic Album	Redone	The Fame	Won
2010	Album of the Year	Redone	The Fame	Nominated
2010	Best Dance Recording	Redone	Poker Face	Won
2010	Record of the Year	Redone	Poker Face	Nominated
2010	Song of the Year	Redone	Poker Face	Nominated
2011	Best Pop Vocal Album	Redone	The Fame Monster	Won
2011	Album of the Year	Redone	The Fame Monster	Nominated
2011	Producer of the Year, Non-Classical	Redone	RedOne	Nominated
2011	Album of the Year (Latin)	Redone	Euphoria	Nominated
2012	Album of the Year	Redone	Born This Way	Nominated
2016	Best Rap Song	French Montana	All Day (as a songwriter)	Nominated
2017	Best Rap Song	French Montana	All the Way Up (with Fat Joe & Remy Ma and Infared)	Nominated
2017	Best Rap Performance	French Montana	All the Way Up (with Fat Joe & Remy Ma and Infared)	Nominated

== Netherlands ==
- 2002: Harry Coster (technician, in the category Best Historical Album)
- 2010: Afrojack in the category Best Remixed Recording
- 2015: Tiësto in the category Best Remixed Recording
- 2016: Metropole Orkest (with Snarky Puppy) in the category Best Contemporary Instrumental Album

== Nigeria ==
- List of Nigerian Grammy Award winners and nominees

== New Zealand ==
- List of New Zealand Grammy Award winners and nominees

== Pakistan ==
Year	Category	Nominee(s)	Nominated for	Result
1997	Best World Music Album	Nusrat Fateh Ali Khan	Night Song	Nominated
1997	Best Traditional Folk Album	Nusrat Fateh Ali Khan	Intoxicated Spirit	Nominated
2022	Album of the Year	Aswad Asif	Donda	Nominated
2022	Best Global Music Performance	Arooj Aftab	Mohabbat	Won
2022	Best New Artist	Arooj Aftab	Herself	Nominated
2023	Best Global Music Performance	Arooj Aftab	Udhero Na	Nominated
2024	Best Alternative Jazz Album	Arooj Aftab	Love in Exile	Nominated
2024	Best Global Music Performance	Arooj Aftab	Shadow Forces	Nominated
2025	Best Global Music Performance	Arooj Aftab	"Raat Ki Rani"	Nominated
2025	Best Alternative Jazz Album	Arooj Aftab	Night Reign	Nominated

== Peru ==
Year	Category	Nominees(s)	Nominated for	Result
2005	Best Traditional World Music Album	Perú Negro	Jolgorio	Nominated
2022	Best Tropical Latin Album	Tony Succar	Live in Peru	Nominated
2024	Best Global Music Album	Susana Baca	Epifanías	Nominated
2024	Best Tropical Latin Album	Tony Succar & Mimy Succar	Mimy & Tony	Nominated
2025	Best Tropical Latin Album	Tony Succar & Mimy Succar	Alma, corazón y salsa (Live at Gran Teatro Nacional)	Won
2025	Best Global Music Performance	Mimy Succar	"Bemba Colorá" (as featured artist)	Won

== Philippines ==
Year	Category	Nominees(s)	Nominated for	Result
2017	Best Musical Theater Album	Jhett Tolentino (producer)	The Color Purple	Won

== Poland ==
- List of Polish Grammy Award winners and nominees

== Puerto Rico ==
- List of Puerto Rican Grammy Award winners and nominees

== Senegal ==
- List of Senegalese Grammy Award winners and nominees

== South Africa ==
- List of South African Grammy Award winners and nominees

== South Korea ==
Year	Category	Nominee	Nominated for	Result
1993	Best Opera Recording	Sumi Jo	R. Strauss: Die Frau Ohne Schatten	Won
1993	Best Classical Album	Sumi Jo	R. Strauss: Die Frau Ohne Schatten (album)	Nominated
1996	Best Opera Recording	Sumi Jo	Rossini: Tancredi (album)	Nominated
2012	Best Engineered Album, Classical	Byeong Joon Hwang	Aldridge: Elmer Gantry	Won
2016	Best Choral Performance	Byeong Joon Hwang	Rachmaninoff: All-Night Vigil	Won
2016	Best Engineered Album, Classical	Byeong Joon Hwang	Rachmaninoff: All-Night Vigil	Nominated
2019	Best Recording Package	Doohee Lee	Love Yourself: Tear	Nominated
2021	Best Pop Duo/Group Performance	BTS	"Dynamite"	Nominated
2022	Best Pop Duo/Group Performance	BTS	"Butter"	Nominated
2023	Best Pop Duo/Group Performance	BTS	"My Universe" (with Coldplay)	Nominated
2023	Best Music Video	BTS	"Yet to Come"	Nominated
2023	Album of the Year	BTS (as featured artist)	Music of the Spheres	Nominated
2023	Album of the Year	Kim Nam-joon (as songwriter)	Music of the Spheres	Nominated
2023	Album of the Year	Min Yoon-gi (as songwriter)	Music of the Spheres	Nominated
2023	Album of the Year	Jung Ho-seok (as songwriter)	Music of the Spheres	Nominated
2023	Album of the Year	Kang Hyo-won (as producer)	Music of the Spheres	Nominated
2026	Best Pop Duo/Group Performance	Rosé	"Apt."	Nominated
2026	Record of the Year	Rosé	"Apt."	Nominated
2026	Song of the Year	Rosé	"Apt."	Nominated
2026	Best Pop Duo/Group Performance	Ejae	"Golden"	Nominated
2026	Best Remixed Recording	Ejae	"Golden" – David Guetta remix	Nominated
2026	Best Song Written for Visual Media	Ejae	"Golden"	Won
2026	Song of the Year	Ejae	"Golden"	Nominated

== Spain ==
- List of Spanish Grammy Award winners and nominees

== Sri Lanka ==
Year	Category	Nominees(s)	Nominated for	Result
2009	Record of the Year	M.I.A.	"Paper Planes"	Nominated
2013	Best Short Form Music Video	M.I.A.	"Bad Girls"	Nominated
2014	Best Contemporary Instrumental Album	Herb Alpert (Note: Hussain Jiffry was the bass player, who performed on Alpert's 2013 album, Steppin' Out.)	Steppin' Out	Won

== Taiwan ==
Year	Category	Nominees(s)	Nominated for	Result
2005	Best Recording Package	Qing-Yang Xiao	The Wandering Accordion	Nominated
2008	Best Recording Package	Qing-Yang Xiao	White Horse	Nominated
2009	Best Boxed or Special Limited Edition Package	Qing-Yang Xiao	Wu Sheng: Poems& Songs	Nominated
2011	Best Boxed or Special Limited Edition Package	Qing-Yang Xiao	Story Island	Nominated
2019	Best Recording Package	Qing-Yang Xiao	The chairman: The Offering	Nominated
2022	Best Recording Package	Qing-Yang Xiao	Soul of Ears: Zeta	Nominated
2022	Best Recording Package	Li Jheng Han & Yu Wei	Pakelang	Won

== Trinidad and Tobago ==
Year	Category	Nominees(s)	Nominated for	Result
2011	Best Rap Performance by a Duo or Group	Nicki Minaj	"My Chick Bad" (with Ludacris)	Nominated
2012	Best New Artist	Nicki Minaj	Herself	Nominated
2012	Album of the Year	Nicki Minaj	Loud (as featured artist)	Nominated
2012	Best Rap Performance	Nicki Minaj	"Moment 4 Life" (featuring Drake)	Nominated
2012	Best Rap Album	Nicki Minaj	Pink Friday	Nominated
2015	Best Rap Song	Nicki Minaj	"Anaconda"	Nominated
2015	Best Pop Duo/Group Performance	Nicki Minaj	"Bang Bang" (with Jessie J and Ariana Grande)	Nominated
2016	Best Rap/Sung Collaboration	Nicki Minaj	"Only" (featuring Drake, Lil Wayne and Chris Brown)	Nominated
2016	Best Rap Performance	Nicki Minaj	"Truffle Butter" (featuring Drake and Lil Wayne)	Nominated
2016	Best Rap Album	Nicki Minaj	The Pinkprint	Nominated
2024	Best Rap Song	Nicki Minaj	"Barbie World" (with Ice Spice featuring Aqua for the film Barbie)	Nominated
2024	Best Song Written For Visual Media	Nicki Minaj	"Barbie World" (with Ice Spice featuring Aqua for the film Barbie)	Nominated

== United Kingdom ==
- List of British Grammy winners and nominees

== United States ==
- List of American Grammy Award winners and nominees

== Uruguay ==
- List of Uruguayan Grammy Award winners and nominees

== Venezuela ==
Year	Category	Nominee(s)	Nominated for	Result
1984	Best Latin Pop Performance	José Luis Rodríguez	Ven	Nominated
1989	Best Tropical Latin Performance	Oscar D'León	La Salsa Soy Yo	Nominated
1990	Best Latin Pop Performance	José Luis Rodríguez	Baila Mi Rumba	Nominated
1993	Best Latin Pop Performance	José Luis Rodríguez	El Puma en Ritmo	Nominated
1997	Best Tropical Latin Performance	Oscar D'León	El Salsero del Mundo	Nominated
1999	Best Salsa Performance	Oscar D'León	La Formula Original	Nominated
2001	Best Salsa Performance	Oscar D'León	Doble Play	Nominated
2001	Best Latin Rock or Alternative Album	Los Amigos Invisibles	Arepa 3000	Nominated
2007	Best Latin Rock or Alternative Album	Los Amigos Invisibles	Super Pop Venezuela	Nominated
2007	Best Tropical Latin Album	Oscar D'León	Fuzionando	Nominated
2012	Best Latin Pop, Rock or Urban Album	La Vida Bohème	Nuestra	Nominated
2012	Best Orchestral Performance	Gustavo Dudamel	"Brahms: Symphony No. 4"	Won
2014	Traditional Pop Album	Linda Briceño	Tiempo	Nominated
2014	Best New Artist	Linda Briceño	Tiempo	Nominated
2018	Producer of the Year	Linda Briceño	"11" (Linda Briceño Featuring Ella Bric & The Hidden Figures) (S); Segundo Piso (Mv Caldera) (A)	Won
2019	Best Instrumental Album	Linda Briceño	Balance	Won
2020	Best Orchestral Performance	Gustavo Dudamel	"Norman: Sustain"	Won
2021	Best Orchestral Performance	Gustavo Dudamel	"Ives: Complete Symphonies"	Won
2022	Best Choral Performance	Gustavo Dudamel	"Mahler: Symphony No. 8, 'Symphony Of A Thousand'"	Won
2023	Best Orchestral Performance	Gustavo Dudamel	"Dvorák: Symphonies Nos. 7–9"	Nominated
2025	Best Orchestral Performance	Gustavo Dudamel	"Ortiz: Revolución Diamantina"	Won
2025	Best Classical Compendium	Gustavo Dudamel	Ortiz: Revolución Diamantina	Won
2025	Best Latin Rock or Alternative Album	Rawayana	"¿Quién trae las cornetas?"	Won

== Vietnam ==
Year	Nominees	Category	Nominated for	Result
2003	Cuong Vu (Note: As a member of the Pat Metheny Group)	Best Pop Instrumental Performance	"As It Is"	Nominated
2003	Cuong Vu	Best Contemporary Jazz Album	Speaking of Now	Won
2005	Cuong Vu	Best Contemporary Jazz Album	The Way Up	Won
2021	Julian-Quán Việt Lê (Note: As producer, recording engineer, songwriter)	Album of the Year	Chilombo	Nominated
2024	Duy Đào	Best Boxed or Special Limited Edition Package	Gieo	Nominated
2025	Sangeeta Kaur	Best Classical Compendium	Mythologies II	Nominated
2025	Hai Nguyen (Note: As producer)	Best Classical Compendium	Mythologies II	Nominated
2026	Hà Trịnh Quốc Bảo	Best Recording Package	And the Adjacent Possible	Nominated
