= Ana Tijoux =

Chilean musician (born 1977)

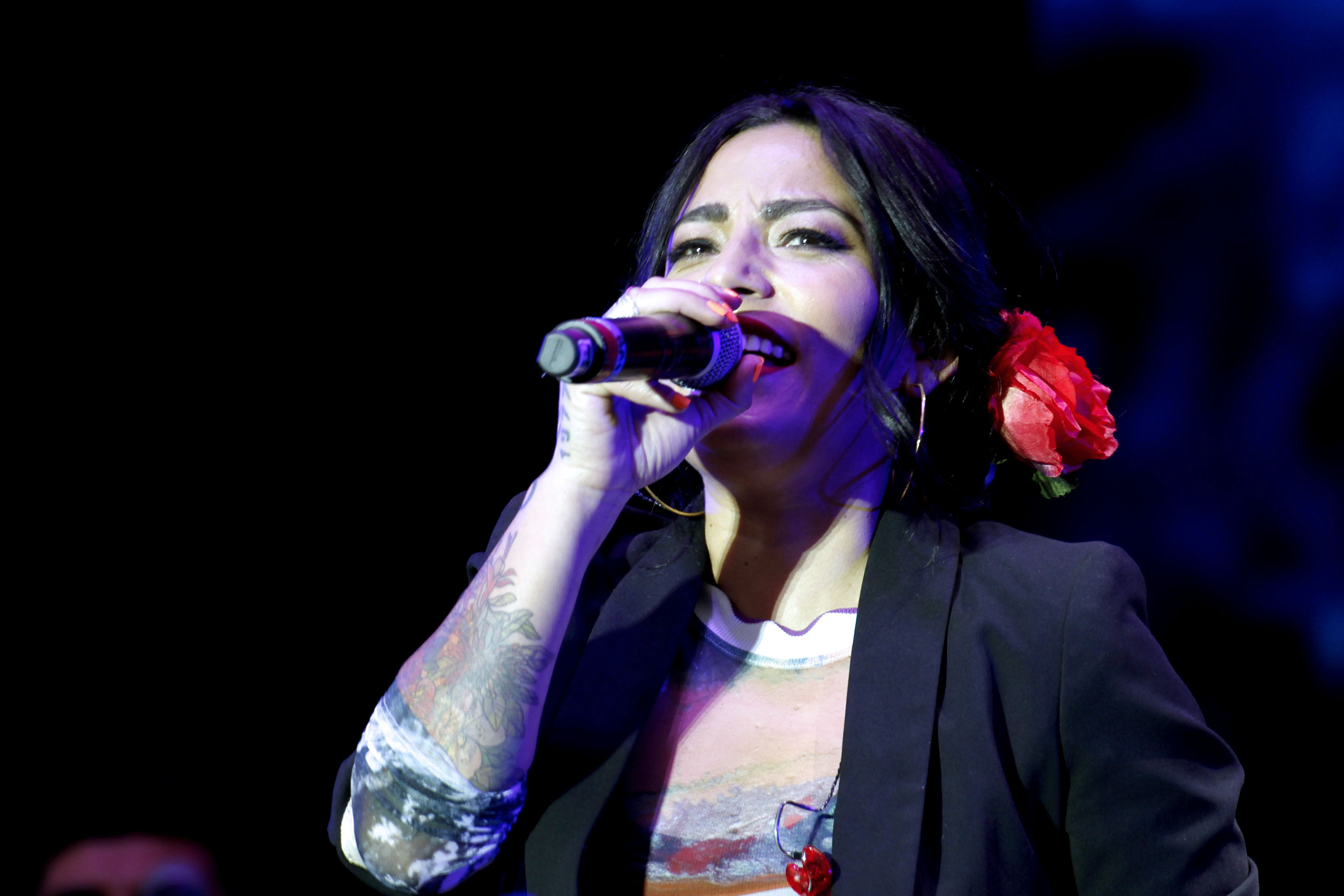
- Tijoux in 2020 in Mexico City

Background information
- Born: Anamaría Merino Tijoux; 12 June 1977 (age 49); Lille, France
- Genres: Alternative hip hop; Latin pop; urban contemporary; R&B
- Occupations: Musician; singer; rapper
- Instruments: Guitar; vocals
- Years active: 1997–present
- Labels: Oveja Negra; Nacional Records; Quemasucabeza; Altafonte
- Website: anatijouxoficial.com

Anamaría Tijoux Merino (French pronunciation: [anamaʁja tiʒu meʁino], Spanish: [meˈɾino]; born 12 June 1977), commonly known by her stage name Ana Tijoux or Anita Tijoux (/tiˈʒuː/), is a French-born Chilean musician. Her music contains political and popular themes. She became famous in Latin America as the MC of hip hop band Makiza during the late 1990s. In 2006, she crossed over to the mainstream of Latin pop after her collaboration with Mexican singer Julieta Venegas in the radio hit "Eres para mí". She gained more widespread recognition following her second solo album, 1977, and later with La bala (2011) and Vengo (2014) which brought her a Best Artist of the year award in the 2015 Pulsar Awards.

Tijoux is the daughter of Chilean parents who lived in political exile in France under Augusto Pinochet's dictatorship in Chile.

== Early life ==
Anamaría Tijoux Merino was born on 12 June 1977 in Lille, France. She is the daughter of two Chilean exiles who fled Chile to France after the 1973 Chilean coup d'état. Her mother is Chilean sociologist María Emilia Tijoux. In 1978, her family moved to Paris, and when she was 6 years old her family traveled to Chile in 1983 and where she first met her grandparents and extended family who had stayed in the country during the coup.

She returned to Chile with her parents when she was 14, and was given a scholarship to study at a private school for French immigrants located in Vitacura. After finishing school, she entered university to study design and began working as a part-time waitress.

After the 1998 debut of Makiza and the sudden fame and recognition she started to acquire, Tijoux felt overwhelmed and decided to put a halt on her musical career and return to her anonymity in France, where she started working in a variety of jobs, such as a waitress, school inspector, janitor, and pollster. Subsequently, she decided to return to Chile and resume her solo career as a rapper.

== Career ==
In 1988, Tijoux met Consuelo Vergara, who taught Tijoux how to rap and sparked Tijoux's interest in hip-hop and dance. Tijoux moved to Chile after the return of civil power in 1993. In 1995, influenced by the local rap group Makul in Santiago, Chile, Tijoux formed her own group called Los Gemelos with Zaturno, another rap artist. In 1997, Tijoux became widely popular for her participation in the group Los Tetas and their first studio album release. She collaborated with Seo2, Cenzi, and DJ Squat to form the group Makiza.

=== 1997–2006: Makiza ===
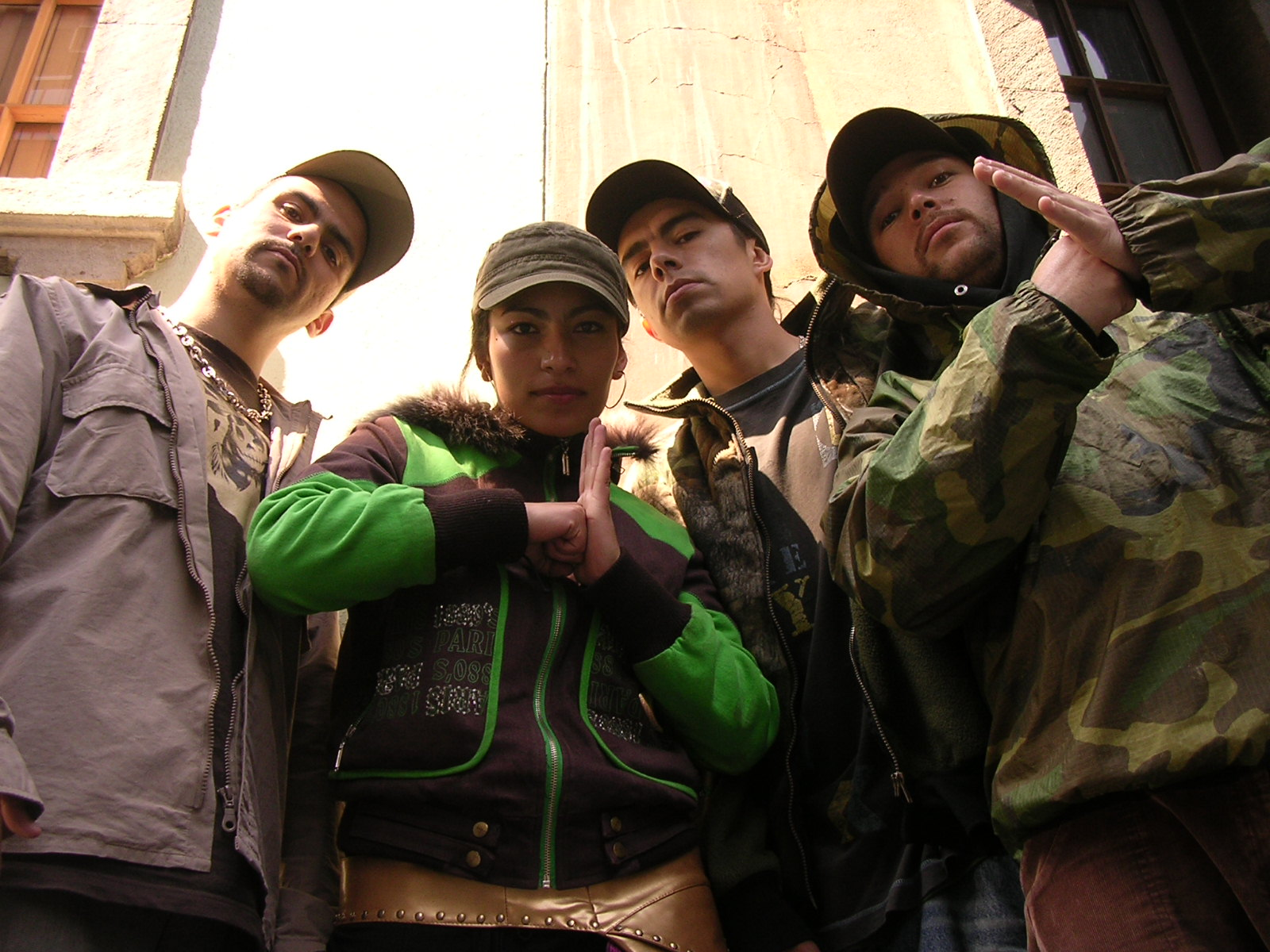
With Makiza in 2005.

In 1997, the group released their first CD, Vida Salvaje, with great success even though it was an independent production.

In 1999, Makiza released "Aerolineas Makiza" on Sony Music Entertainment, who became interested in Chilean rap as a result of Tiro de Gracia, a bestselling Chilean rap group. Makiza's album included new and improved versions of songs from Vida Salvaje with two new songs, one of which was the hit single "La Rosa de los Vientos". This album put Makiza at the top of the Latin American hip-hop market, as their style was much more evolved than other groups at the time. The production style resembled the New York underground sound inspired by the Native Tongues. The lyrics of Makiza lacked the overwhelming "machismo" and violence of average rap, and the group "was often praised for exploring sensitive matters devoid of violence." This helped Makiza receive approval from a wider population.

In 2000, Makiza covered the popular song "Somos tontos, no pesados" by Los Tres. At the end of that year, the members of Makiza separated due to its members' desire to work on personal projects before their tour through neighboring countries. Tijoux specified that she would be leaving hip-hop and her music career.

In 2003, Tijoux returned to Chile and worked on musical projects with Aluzinati, a Chilean funk band. She also recorded "Lo Que Tu Me Das" with Mexican singer Julieta Venegas for the soundtrack to the film Subterra, and appeared as a featured artist on Mexican hip-hop group Control Machete's final album Uno, Dos: Bandera.

In 2004, Makiza came back together and announced a tour to promote the re-release of Vida Salvaje, which was remastered and in CD format. Tijoux and Seo2, the only musically active remaining members of the group, decided to reunite the band and work on new material. The group released its third album in 2005, Casino Royale, under the independent label Bizarre Records. The album involved various producers, rather than one producer like previous albums released, and involved a third Chilean MC, Sonido Ácido. During this time, Tijoux also voiced "Nea" in the animated series Pulentos.

In 2006, the group broke up permanently due to differences in beliefs about musical production and direction.

=== Solo career ===
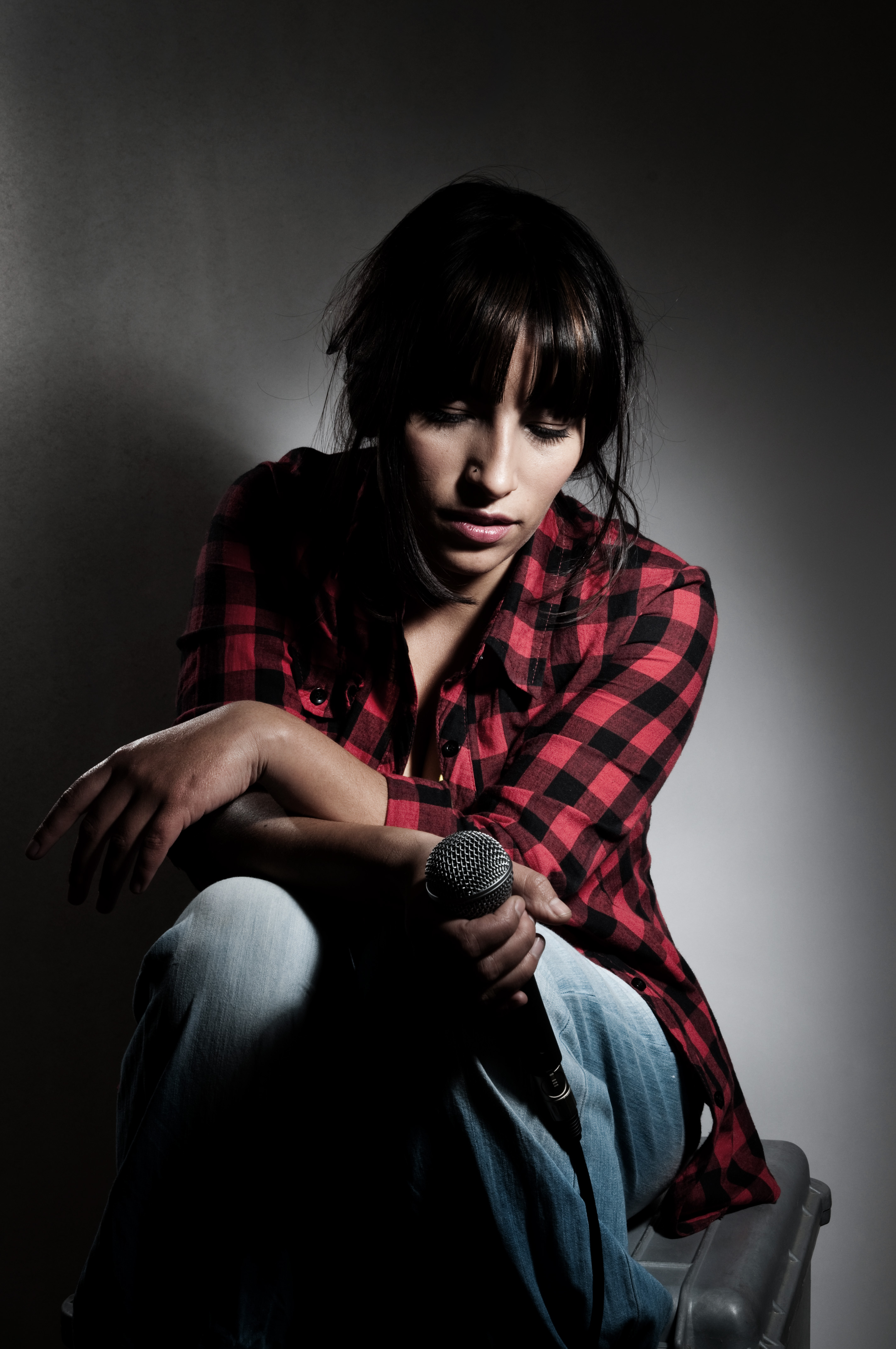
Ana Tijoux in 2009

In November 2006, Tijoux released her first single "Ya no fue" and debuted as a solo artist. Due to problems with "La Oreja" record label, her first album which was produced by Erasmo de la Parra and Camilo Salinas was never released. In January 2007, Tijoux collaborated again with Julieta Venegas on her song "Eres para mi" from her album Limón y sal. The two artists achieved major success in Latin America.

In September 2007, Tijoux released her first solo album under the independent label Oveja Negra, founded by the Sociedad Chilena del Derecho. The album was titled Kaos, and its first single, "Despabilate", was well accepted by the Chilean public and nominated at the Latino MTV Video Music Awards under the categories Best New Artist and Best Urban Artist. She was also nominated for Song of the Year with Julieta Venegas for their collaboration "Eres Para Mi".

On 29 June 2009, Tijoux performed at the Mexican music festival Vive Latino and continued touring across Mexico soon thereafter.

In March 2010, Tijoux released her second solo album, 1977, titled after the year she was born. The album was very much a return to her rap roots, paying homage to the "golden age of hip-hop". The album was largely autobiographical, exploring themes from her own life that included the death of a close friend, experiencing creative crises, friendships, and bad luck, among others. The album marked a significant distancing from the pop music and pop collaborations Tijoux had been doing in collaboration with other artists. She rapped on this album in both Spanish and French as a raw and direct, as well as mature, MC. The album was produced by Hordatoj, Foex, and Tee of the Potoco Discos label with Habitacion del Panico. The album and single 1977 were immediate hits in the underground rap circles of Chile. The record was amongst the top 10 in 2009 for the blog WorldHipHopMarket.com and it was picked up by the United States–based Latino Alternative label Nacional Records, who released it the next year. Tijoux was invited to perform at the South by Southwest (SXSW) Music Festival in Austin, Texas. She soon began her first North American tour. On 24 May 2010 Thom Yorke, the lead singer of Radiohead, advised his listeners to listen to 1977, on a list he created of his favorite bands and songs. The list also featured popular artists such as The John Coltrane Quartet Plays and Björk. Yorke introduced the song as one of his favorite ones of the summer. In 2011, the song was featured on the EA Sports video game FIFA 11. It also appears in Breaking Bad (season 4, episode 5).

In September 2012, Tijoux was featured in a campaign called "30 Songs / 30 Days" to support Half the Sky: Turning Oppression into Opportunity for Women Worldwide, a multi-platform media project inspired by Nicholas Kristof and Sheryl WuDunn's book. On 19 September 2011 MTV Iggy put her in the first position of his list "Best New Female Emcees Dominating Mics Everywhere".

In 2014, Tijoux performed at the SXSW music festival, and based on her performance she was subsequently named "Best Rapper en Español" by Rolling Stone magazine. This year Tijoux also won her first Latin Grammy for Record of the Year for the song "Universos paralelos", a collaboration with Uruguayan musician Jorge Drexler.

In 2020, Tijoux's feminist-themed song "No estamos solas" was chosen as the theme song for La Jauría, the first Chilean Amazon Prime Video original series, which premiered on 10 July. In November 2020, Tijoux was included on the BBC's 100 Women 2020 list, highlighting her involvement "in campaigns against inequality and oppression in the world".

== Personal life ==
In February 2019, Tijoux married Jon Grandcamp Jr, a French fellow musician. In June 2019, Tijoux left Chile to permanently settle in Paris, France, with Grandcamp and her two children.

== Political activism ==
In her music, Tijoux discusses themes of marginalization, international/national identity, and colonialism. She herself has described her musical output as a result of political knowledge. Tijoux is a feminist activist, and feminist themes also play a major role in her music. Tijoux is a supporter of Palestinians. In 2022, Tijoux signed onto the Musicians For Palestine pledge, refusing to perform in Israel. Tijoux is an anti-capitalist. She has expressed support for the environment, especially the protection of indigenous cultural practices related to nature such as in "Río Abajo" from Vengo.

Tijoux's songs have been connected to Chilean protest movements. "Shock" from her 2011 album La Bala became an anthem of a student protest movement in the early 2010s that addressed the unaffordable costs of higher education in the country. Protesters are said to have appreciated the song's anti-capitalist messaging and its condemnation of "shock doctrine," a political strategy used by Augusto Pinochet's dictatorship where hurtful economic policies are installed in the wake of chaotic events and reinforced with violence. The lyrics of "Somos Sur" from Vengo promoted further activism following a period of protests around the world in 2014. In 2019, Tijoux posted a video montage of protests happening in Chile with her newly released song “Cacerolazo” playing in the background, whose lyrics reflect the policies that culminated in the action and broader historical context for the movement such as aftereffects of Pinochet's rule.

Tijoux has also collaborated with other artists in politically meaningful ways. In 2014, she launched “Somos Sur” with Shadia Mansour, a single that called for the unification of all marginalized countries, especially Palestine, against colonialism and included the British-Palestinian Mansour rapping in Arabic. 2020 saw Tijoux collaborating with Chilean rapper MC Millaray in “Rebelión de Octubre.” This song commemorates the circumstances behind and the treatment of the 2019 Chilean protests. MC Millaray’s involvement adds a Mapuche voice, an indigenous group in part located in Chile.

== Discography ==
=== Studio albums ===
- Kaos (2007)
- 1977 (2010)
- Elefant Mixtape (2011)
- La Bala (2011)
- Vengo (2014)
- Vida (2024)

=== Singles ===
- "Calaveritas" (feat. Celso Piña) (2016)
- "Luchín" (2016)
- "Cacerolazo" (2019)
- "Libertad" (2020)
- "Antifa Dance" (2020)
- "No estamos solas" (2020)
- "Pa que" (2020)
- "Rebelión de octubre" (feat. MC Millaray) (2020)
- "Hijo de la Rebeldía" (feat. Cidtronyck, Masquemusica, Stailok & Valtònyc) (2021)
- "Mal" (2021)
- "Niñx" (2023)

=== EP's ===
- Serpiente de Madera (2025)

=== Collaborations ===
- "Santiago penando estás" – Después de Vivir un Siglo – Tributo a Violeta Parra (2001)
- "Subdemo" – FDA
- "Uno, dos: bandera" – Control Machete
- "Roda Do Funk" – Funk Como Le Gusta
- "Lo que tú me das" – Julieta Venegas
- Eres para mí – Julieta Venegas
- "Vuelve" – Julieta Venegas
- "Freno de mano" – Los Tres
- "La medicina" – Los Tetas
- "Supervielle" – Bajofondo Tango Club
- Música para después del almuerzo – Bitman & Roban
- "E.L.H.Y.L.D." – Hordatoj
- "Tú y tu mirar, yo y mi canción" – Los Bunkers
- "No me digas" – Sayag Jazz Machine
- "Veneno" – Aerstame
- "Ayer" – Hordatoj (El tintero)
- "Si te preguntan" – Los Aldeanos
- "Suena" – Ondatrópica produced by Quantic & Mario Galeano (2012)
- "Hypnotized" – Morcheeba
- "Somos Sur" – Shadia Mansour
- "Sr.Cobranza 25 años" – Las Manos de Filippi
- "Hit Me" – MTV Unplugged Molotov (2018)
- "El extraño viaje" – Los chikos del maíz (2019)
- "Rebelión de Octubre" – MC Millaray (2020)
- "Lightning Over Mexico" – Tom Morello & The Bloody Beetroots (2021)
- "Lluvia Frenesí" – Amanitas

=== Grammy Awards ===
Year	Category	Nominated work	Result
2011	Best Latin Rock, Urban or Alternative Album	1977	Nominated
2013	Best Latin Rock, Urban or Alternative Album	La Bala	Nominated
2015	Best Latin Rock, Urban or Alternative Album	Vengo	Nominated

=== Latin Grammy Awards ===
Year	Category	Nominated work	Result
2012	Best Urban Music Album	La Bala	Nominated
2013	Best Urban Song	"Sacar la Voz" (featuring Jorge Drexler)	Nominated
2014	Best Urban Song	"Vengo"	Nominated
2014	Record of the Year	"Universos Paralelos" (with Jorge Drexler)	Won
2014	Song of the Year	"Universos Paralelos" (with Jorge Drexler)	Nominated
