= Vida (Ana Tijoux album) =

Studio album by Ana Tijoux
- Released: 18 January 2024
- Recorded: 2023
- Genre: Hip hop, Latin hip hop
- Label: Altafonte

Ana Tijoux chronology
Vengo (2014)	Vida (2024)

Singles from Vida
- 1. "Niñx" Released: 18 May 2023; 2. "Tania" Released: 5 October 2023

Vida is the fifth solo studio album by Latin hip hop artist Ana Tijoux. The album, released in 2024, is her first album since Vengo in 2014.

The album was recorded in 2023 in Barcelona. It was produced by Andrés Celis, who collaborated with Tijoux on the albums La Bala and Vengo.

The first single from the album, "Niñx", was released on 18 May 2023. The video for the single was directed by Camila Grandi. The second single, "Tania", was released on 5 October 2023 and is an ode to Tijoux's sister who died from cancer in 2019.

Vida incorporates elements of hip-hop, Latin rhythms, and jazz. String arrangements for the album were done by Alberto Pérez. The influence of Afrobeats and reggaeton can be heard on the tracks "Cora", "Dime qué", and "Bailando solo aquí".

Vida includes collaborations with several artists, including Omar Lye-Fook, Talib Kweli and Plug. The song "Busco Mi Nombre" concerns those who were disappeared during the dictatorships in Argentina and Chile and features iLe of the Puerto Rican group Calle 13. The track "Busco" samples a monologue by Estela de Carlotto of the Grandmothers of the Plaza de Mayo.

Professional ratings
Review scores
Source	Rating
AllMusic	4/5 stars

== Track listing ==
All tracks are written by written by Tijoux and Celis. Including with features.

No.	Title	Writer(s)	Length
1.	"Millonaria"	Tijoux, Celis	3:36
2.	"Oyeme"	Tijoux, Celis	3:15
3.	"Cora"	Tijoux, Celis	3:59
4.	"Vida" (featuring Omar)	Tijoux, Celis, Omar Lye-Fook	3:49
5.	"Ciclo Perfecto"	Tijoux, Celis	0:59
6.	"Tu sae'" (featuring Talib Kweli and Plug)	Tijoux, Celis	4:15
7.	"Suave"	Tijoux, Celis	1:16
8.	"El Caudal"	Tijoux, Celis	1:39
9.	"Niñx"	Tijoux, Celis	3:07
10.	"Bailando sola aquí"	Tijoux, Celis	4:04
11.	"Tania"	Tijoux, Celis	4:02
12.	"Busco" (featuring Estela de Carlotto, a Grandmother of Plaza de Mayo)	Tijoux, Celis	0:39
13.	"Busco mi nombre" (featuring iLe)	Tijoux, Celis	3:52
14.	"Dime qué" (featuring Pablo Chill-E)	Tijoux, Celis, Pablo Acevedo	3:24
15.	"Fin del mundo"	Tijoux, Celis	4:20
Total length:			46:21
