= List of Australian Grammy Award winners =

This list details Australian musicians, performers, producers and composers that have been successful in winning a Grammy Award. Many on the list have also been inducted into the Australian Recording Industry Association ARIA Hall of Fame.

A Grammy Award (originally called Gramophone Award) – or Grammy – is an accolade by the National Academy of Recording Arts and Sciences of the United States to recognise outstanding achievement in the music industry. The first Grammy Awards ceremony was held on 4 May 1959, and it was set up to honour musical accomplishments by performers for the year 1958.

Australian musicians and performers have produced a wide variety of popular music which has been commercially successful on the international scene. However, success at the Grammy Awards has been quite rare for Australian musicians. The first Australian to win a Grammy was Joan Sutherland in 1961. The most successful Australians (all of whom were not born in Australia) are The Bee Gees, Olivia Newton-John and Keith Urban who have won 4 Grammy Awards each.

== Categories ==
=== Record of the Year ===
Record of the Year is awarded to the performer and the production team of a single song.

Year	Name	Title	Notes	Ref
2012	Gotye	Somebody That I Used to Know	Artist, producer & engineer/mixer; shared with Kimbra (artist), François Tétaz (engineer/mixer) & William Bowden (mastering engineer)	
1984	Terry Britten	What's Love Got to Do With It	Producer; shared with Tina Turner (artist)	
1974	Olivia Newton-John	I Honestly Love You	Artist; shared with John Farrar (producer)	

=== Album of the Year ===
Album of the Year is awarded to the performer and the production team of a full album.

Year	Name	Title	Notes	Ref
1978	Bee Gees	Saturday Night Fever – Soundtrack	Shared with Various Artists	
2016	Samuel Dixon	Adele – 25	Shared with Various Artists	
2016	Cameron Craig	Adele – 25	Shared with Various Artists	

=== Song of the Year ===
Song of the Year is awarded to the composer(s) of the song.

Year	Name	Title	Notes	Ref
1984	Terry Britten	What's Love Got to Do With It	Shared with Graham Lyle	

=== Best New Artist ===
Best New Artist is awarded to a promising breakthrough performer who releases, during the Eligibility Year, the first recording that establishes the public identity of that artist (which is not necessarily their first proper release).

Year	Name	Notes	Ref
1982	Men at Work		

=== Best Pop Duo/Group Performance ===
Year	Name	Title	Notes	Ref
2012	Gotye	Somebody That I Used to Know	Shared with Kimbra	

=== Best Pop Performance by a Duo or Group with Vocals ===
Year	Name	Title	Notes	Ref
1978	Bee Gees	Saturday Night Fever Soundtrack		
1977	Bee Gees	How Deep Is Your Love		

=== Best Hard Rock Performance ===
Year	Name	Title	Notes	Ref
2009	AC/DC	War Machine		
2006	Wolfmother	Woman		

=== Best Dance Recording ===
Year	Name	Title	Notes	Ref
2004	Kylie Minogue	Come into My World		

=== Best Pop Dance Recording ===
Year	Name	Title	Notes	Ref
2024	Kylie Minogue	Padam Padam		

=== Best Dance/Electronic Recording ===
Year	Name	Title	Notes	Ref
2022	Rüfüs Du Sol	Alive		
2025	Tame Impala	Neverender	Shared with Justice	
2026	Tame Impala	End of Summer		

=== Best Dance/Electronic Album ===
Year	Name	Title	Notes	Ref
2016	Flume	Skin		

=== Best Alternative Music album ===
Year	Name	Title	Notes	Ref
2012	Gotye (producer), François Tétaz (engineer/mixer)	Making Mirrors		
2024	Catherine Marks	The Record	Producer; shared with Boygenius (artist)	

=== Best Rap Album ===
Year	Name	Title	Notes	Ref
2015	M-Phazes	The Marshall Mathers LP2	Producer; shared with Eminem (artist)	

=== Best R&B Album ===
Year	Name	Title	Notes	Ref
2021	Mike Waters	Bigger Love	Songwriter; shared with John Legend (artist)	

=== Best Male Rock Vocal Performance ===
Year	Name	Title	Notes	Ref
1981	Rick Springfield	Jessie's Girl		

=== Best Female Pop Vocal Performance ===
Year	Name	Title	Notes	Ref
1974	Olivia Newton-John	I Honestly Love You		
1972	Helen Reddy	I Am Woman		

=== Best Female Country Vocal Performance ===
Year	Name	Title	Notes	Ref
1973	Olivia Newton-John	Let Me Be There		

=== Best Male Country Vocal Performance ===
Year	Name	Title	Notes	Ref
2010	Keith Urban	'Til Summer Comes Around		
2009	Keith Urban	Sweet Thing		
2007	Keith Urban	Stupid Boy		
2005	Keith Urban	You'll Think of Me		

=== Best Classical Vocal Soloist Performance ===
Year	Name	Title	Notes	Ref
1981	Joan Sutherland	Live From Lincoln Center – Sutherland/Horne/Pavarotti	Shared with Luciano Pavarotti, Marilyn Horne & Richard Bonynge (conductor)	

=== Best Classical Performance – Vocal Soloist (With or Without Orchestra) ===
Year	Name	Title	Notes	Ref
1961	Joan Sutherland	The Art of the Prima Donna	Shared with Francesco Molinari-Pradelli (conductor)	

=== Video of the Year ===
Year	Name	Title	Notes	Ref
1982	Olivia Newton-John	Physical		

=== Producer of the Year, Non-Classical ===
Year	Name	Notes	Ref
1978	Bee Gees	Shared with Albhy Galuten and Karl Richardson	

=== Best Engineered Album, Non-Classical ===
Year	Name	Notes	Ref
2007	Cameron Craig	Shared with Jimmy Hogarth, Tchad Blake and Emery Dobyns	

=== Best Compilation Soundtrack For Visual Media ===
Year	Name	Title	Notes	Ref
2018	Hugh Jackman	The Greatest Showman	Shared with Various Artists	

=== Best Music Film ===
Year	Name	Title	Notes	Ref
2018	Alan Hicks	Quincy	Shared with Quincy Jones, Rashida Jones (video director) and Paula DuPré Pesmen (video producer)	

=== Best Rock or Rap Gospel Album ===
Year	Name	Title	Notes	Ref
2009	David Jacques	Live Revelations	Full Credits: Third Day (Tai Anderson, David Carr, Mark Lee, Mac Powell), artist. Chris Biggs, David Jacques & Don McCollister, engineers/mixers. Third Day (Tai Anderson, David Carr, Mark Lee, Mac Powell), producer.	

=== Best Gospel Album ===
Year	Name	Album title	Notes	Ref
2016	Henry Seeley	Covered: Alive in Asia	Shared with Israel Houghton	

=== Best Contemporary Christian Music Performance/Song ===
Year	Name	Title	Notes	Ref
2018	Paul Mabury	You Say	Shared with Lauren Daigle	

=== Best Christian Music Album ===
Year	Name	Album title	Notes	Ref
2018	Paul Mabury	Look Up Child	Shared with Lauren Daigle	

=== Best Chamber Music/Small Ensemble Performance ===
In 2013 Best Small Ensemble Performance was renamed to Best Chamber Music/Small Ensemble Performance.

Year	Name	Title	Notes	Ref
2011	Tim Munro	Mackey: Lonely Motel - Music From Slide	Full credits: David Frost, producer; Eighth Blackbird (Matt Albert, Matthew Duvall, Lisa Kaplan, Michael J. Maccaferri & Nicholas Photinos), ensembles; Tom Lazarus, Mat Lejeune, Bill Maylone & Jon Zacks, engineers/mixers	
2012	Tim Munro	Eighth Blackbird: Meanwhile	Full credits: Judith Sherman, producer; Eighth Blackbird (Matt Albert, Matthew Duvall, Lisa Kaplan, Michael J. Maccaferri, Tim Munro & Nicholas Photinos), ensembles; Bill Maylone, engineer/mixer	
2015	Tim Munro	Eighth Blackbird: Filament	Full credits: Bryce Dessner, producer; Jonathan Low, engineer; Eighth Blackbird (Matt Albert, Matthew Duvall, Lisa Kaplan, Michael J. Maccaferri, Tim Munro & Nicholas Photinos)	

=== Best Arrangement, Instrumental or A Cappella ===
Year	Name	Album title	Notes	Ref
2024	Tommy Emmanuel	Folsom Prison Blues	Shared with John Carter Cash, Markus Illko, Janet Robin, Roberto Luis Rodriguez & The String Revolution	
