= Supervielle =

Supervielle is a surname. Notable people with the surname include:

- Ana Carmen Baron Supervielle (1950–2015), Argentine writer and journalist
- Jules Supervielle (1884–1960), Uruguayan-French poet and writer
- Luciano Supervielle (born 1976), Uruguayan-French musician
- Manuel Fernández Supervielle (1894–1947), Cuban politician
- Odile Baron Supervielle (1915–2010), Uruguayan-born Argentine writer and journalist
- Susana Baron Supervielle (1910–2004), Argentine composer
