= Elefant Mixtape =

Remix album by Ana Tijoux
- Released: February 2011
- Recorded: 2011
- Genre: Latin, Hip hop
- Length: 24:42

Ana Tijoux chronology
1977 (2010)	Elefant Mixtape (2011)	La Bala (2011)

Elefant Mixtape is an EP by Latin hip hop artist Ana Tijoux, released February 2011 on her website. It was produced by DJ Tee and mixed by DJ Dacel.

== Track listing ==
No.	Title	Producer(s)	Length
1.	"Tambalea"	DJ Tee
2.	"Obstaculo"	DJ Tee
3.	"Problema De 2"	DJ Tee
4.	"La Rosa De Los Vientos Remix"	Oddysee
5.	"Partir De Cero Remix"	Jake One
6.	"Un Dia Cualquiera Remix"	DJ Tee
7.	"Crisis De Un MC Remix"	M-Phazes
8.	"Pie Izquierdo Remix"	Fs Green
9.	"Mar Adentro Remix"	Geoslide
10.	"La Vida Es Como Un Sueño Remix"	Kev Brown
11.	"Sube Remix"	Jaylib
12.	"Nueva Condena Remix"	DJ Tee
13.	"1977 Remix"	Waajeed
