= List of Austrian Grammy Award winners and nominees =

The following is a list of Grammy Awards winners and nominees from Austria:

Year	Category	Nominees(s)	Nominated for	Result
1979	Best Orchestral Performance	Herbert von Karajan	Beethoven: Symphony No. 9	Won
1998	Best World Music Album	Joe Zawinul	My People	Nominated
2000	Remixer of the Year, Non-Classical	Peter Rauhofer	Believe	Won
2010	Technical Award	AKG		Won
2010	Best Contemporary Jazz Album	Joe Zawinul	75	Won (posthumous award)
2010	Best Recording Package	Stefan Sagmeister	Everything That Happens Will Happen Today	Won
2018	Best Opera Recording	Houston Symphony; Chorus Of Students And Alumni, Shepherd School of Music, Rice University, Houston Grand Opera Children's Chorus (Note: The Grammy nomination was to the Houston Symphony et al for their production of Alban Berg's Wozzeck. Hans Graf was the conductor in that production.)	Berg: Wozzeck	Won
2024	Best Arrangement, Instrumental or A Cappella	Markus Illko (The String Revolution featuring Tommy Emmanuel)	Folsom Prison Blues	Won
