= MC Millaray =

Mapuche rapper (born 2006)

- Born: 2006 (age 19–20); La Pincoya, Santiago, Chile
- Occupations: Rapper; Mapuche rights activist
- Years active: 2013–present

Millaray Jara Collío (born c. 2006), known professionally as MC Millaray, is a Mapuche rapper and human rights activist. She is known for her advocacy for Mapuche rights in Chile, a common theme in her lyrics.

== Biography ==
Jara was born and grew up in La Pincoya, a barrio in northern Santiago. She has a younger brother and sister; her parents, Alexis Jara and Claudia Collío, are also rappers. Jara is Mapuche, with her family originally coming from Perquenco in the Araucanía Region, where her great-grandmother still lives. Jara and her family often visited Perquenco growing up, and she grew up speaking both Spanish and Mapudungun. Jara has stated that she identifies as Mapuche and not Chilean.

Jara first started rapping at the age of five, joining in during a performance by her father. At the age of seven, she recorded her first album, Pequeña Feminina; her parents burned the recordings onto CDs, which they then sold on public buses, or while busking. Jara gained greater attention when she performed an original song on a morning television show broadcast by Televisión Nacional de Chile. She has cited Daniella Millaleo as among her musical inspirations.

Jara stated that she became more actively involved in the indigenous rights movement following an incident at her school in 2018 when a teacher had blamed the killing of Camilo Catrillanca, an unarmed Mapuche activist who had been shot dead by police officers in Temucuicui, on Catrillanca. Many of Jara's lyrics since then have revolved around the experiences of Mapuche people in Chile, including the ongoing presence of the Chilean military on Mapuche lands, and "five centuries of Mapuche struggles against European colonisers". Jara has incorporated Mapuche musical sounds, including the afafan (a Mapuche war cry) into songs such as "Mi ser mapuche". While unable to vote in the 2022 Chilean constitutional referendum due to herage, Jara was a vocal supporter of it, including its proposal to guarantee rights for indigenous groups, including Mapuches, to govern their own territories, have greater judicial autonomy, and to be recognised as distinct nations in Chile. The proposal was ultimately fedeated, though Jara stated "this is not the end... it's the bginning of something new". Jara has called for the return of Wallmapu, the historical territory of the Mapuche people prior to Chile's colonisation, and the promotion of Mapuche values.

In 2019, she composed a song for the Network for the Defence of Mapuche Children, and has been its spokesperson since then. In 2020, Jara released the song "Rebelión de octubre" with Ana Tijoux to commemorate the first anniversary of the 2019 Chilean protests.

== Discography ==
- "Rebelión de octubre" (2020) (with Ana Tijoux)
- "Zomo Newen" (2022)
- "Mi ser mapuche" (2022)
