= Vengo (album) =

Studio album by Ana Tijoux
- Released: March 18, 2014
- Recorded: 2013
- Genre: Hip hop, Andean
- Length: 53:15
- Label: Nacional

Ana Tijoux chronology
La Bala (2011)	Vengo (2014)	Vida (2024)

Singles from Vengo
- 1. "Vengo" Released: January 21, 2014

Vengo is Chilean hip hop artist Ana Tijoux's fourth solo studio album, released in March 2014. Its debut single "Vengo" was released on Spin in January of the same year. Vengo was nominated for a Grammy Award for Best Latin Rock, Urban or Alternative Album at the 2015 Ceremony. It also won the Pulsar Award for Album of the Year.

== Reception ==
=== Critical response ===
Professional ratings
Review scores
Source	Rating
AllMusic	4/5 stars
Rolling Stone	3.5/5 stars

A reviewer at NPR called it "virtually flawless", and MTV said it was "some of the most dazzling hip-hop this year".

Several reviewers noted the inclusion of Andean music elements, especially the pan flute. NPR's reviewer said it was "refreshing" and noted Andean music has been "often done a disservice by "world music" labels." Of the flute, the MTV reviewer said "it's a bit challenging to extricate the instrument from its associations with corny new age compilations ... Tijoux is attempting a tough task to take back and breathe new life into music that has a rich heritage, but has been commercialized and marginalized into schlock."

Reviewers also noted the progressive elements of the lyrics, including feminism, environmentalism, social justice and post-colonialism.

The album's instrumentation is completely done with in-studio recordings, often with traditional South American instruments. Unusually for modern hip-hop recording, there are no samples used on the album. One reviewer said that it contained elements of folk music and jazz.

=== Awards ===
Year	Ceremony	Nominated work	Recipient(s)	Category	Result
2015	Grammy Awards	Vengo	Ana Tijoux	Best Latin Rock, Urban or Alternative Album	Nominated

== Track listing ==
No.	Title	Length
1.	"Vengo"	3:12
2.	"Somos Sur" (featuring Shadia Mansour)	3:46
3.	"Antipatriarca"	3:04
4.	"Somos Todos Erroristas" (featuring Hortadoj)	2:57
5.	"Er-rrro-r"	1:02
6.	"Los Peces Gordos No Pueden Volar"	3:36
7.	"Creo en Ti" (featuring Juanito Ayala)	4:00
8.	"Los Diablitos"	0:43
9.	"Interludio Agua"	0:45
10.	"Rio Abajo"	3:54
11.	"Oro Negro"	4:25
12.	"Delta" (featuring MC Niel)	3:47
13.	"No Más"	3:54
14.	"Todo Lo Sólido Se Desvanece en el Aire"	3:39
15.	"Emilia" (featuring RR Burning)	4:13

Bonus tracks
No.	Title	Information	Length
16.	"Rumbo al Sol"		3:18
17.	"Mi Verdad"	Written in 2012 as the theme song to the Chilean television series El reemplazante	2:46

== Charts ==
Chart (2014)	Peak position
US Top Latin Albums (Billboard)	15
US Latin Rhythm Albums (Billboard)	2
