= Kaos (Anita Tijoux album) =

Studio album by Ana Tijoux
- Released: 2007
- Recorded: 2007
- Genre: Latin, hip hop, jazz, dance pop, funk, contemporary R&B, neo-soul
- Length: 39:07

Ana Tijoux chronology
Kaos (2007)	1977 (2010)

Kaos is the debut solo studio album by Latin hip hop artist Ana Tijoux, released in 2007 through Oveja Negra.

== Track listing ==
No.	Title	Length
1.	"Intro"
2.	"Gol"
3.	"Despabílate"
4.	"Dolores, Dolares"
5.	"Llévame Muy Lejos"
6.	"Las Pestañas De Lu"
7.	"Otra Vez"
8.	"Algún Día Te Diré"
9.	"Llueve"
10.	"Tres Copas Y Un Tiro"
11.	"A Veces"
12.	"Izquierda, Derecha"
13.	"Crónicas De Una Muerte Anunciada"
14.	"Desliz Automático"
