= List of Polish Grammy Award winners and nominees =

The following is a list of Grammy Awards winners and nominees from Poland:

Year	Category	Nominees(s)	Nominated for	Result
1960	Best Instrumental Soloist Performance (without orchestra)	Arthur Rubinstein (Note: Arthur Rubinstein was a Polish-American pianist.)	Beethoven: Sonatas No. 21 in C (Waldstein) and No. 18 in E♭	Won
1975	Best Classical Album	Krzysztof Penderecki	Penderecki: Magnificat (Album)	Nominated
1975	Best Choral Performance	Krzysztof Penderecki	Penderecki: Magnificat (Album)	Nominated
1975	Best Chamber Music Performance	Pierre Fournier, Arthur Rubinstein & Henryk Szeryng (Note: Henryk Szeryng was a Polish-Mexican violinist.)	Brahms: Trios (Complete)/Schumann: Trio No. 1 in D Minor	Won
1976	Best Chamber Music Performance	Pierre Fournier, Arthur Rubinstein & Henryk Szeryng	Schubert: Trios Nos. 1 in B♭, Op. 99 and 2 in E♭, Op. 100 (Piano Trios)	Won
1978	Best Instrumental Soloist Performance (without orchestra)	Arthur Rubinstein	Beethoven: Piano Sonata No. 18 in E♭/Schumann: Fantasiestücke, Op. 12	Won
1987	Best Contemporary Composition	Witold Lutosławski (composer) & Esa Pekka Salonen (conductor)	Lutosławski: Symphony No. 3	Won
1988	Best Contemporary Composition	Krzysztof Penderecki	Penderecki: Cello Concerto No. 2	Won
1991	Best Choral Performance	Krzysztof Penderecki	Penderecki: Polish Requiem (Album)	Nominated
1991	Best Choral Performance	Krzysztof Penderecki	Penderecki: St. Luke Passion (Album)	Nominated
1999	Best Classical Contemporary Composition	Krzysztof Penderecki	Penderecki: Violin Concerto No. 2, Metamorphosen	Won
1999	Grammy Award for Best Instrumental Soloist(s) Performance (with orchestra)	Krzysztof Penderecki	Penderecki: Violin Concerto No. 2, Metamorphosen	Won
2013	Best Classical Compendium	Antoni Wit (conductor); Aleksandra Nagorko and Andrzej Sasin (producers)	Penderecki: Fonogrammi; Horn Concerto; The Awakening of Jacob; Anaklasis	Won
2013	Record of the Year	Fun (Note: Fun are an American band.)	"We Are Young" (Note: Pawel Sek was the song's producer.)	Nominated
2013	Album of the Year	Fun	Some Nights (Note: Pawel Sek was the album's producer.)	Nominated
2014	Album of the Year	Taylor Swift (Note: Taylor Swift is an American musician.)	Red (Note: Pawel Sek was the album's producer.)	Nominated
2014	Best Large Jazz Ensembe Album	Randy Brecker, (Note: Rany Brecker is an American musician.) Wlodek Pawlik Trio, Kalisz Philharmonic	Night in Calisia	Won
2017	Best Choral Album	Krzysztof Penderecki (conductor)/Warsaw Philharmonic Choir, Henryk Wojnarowski (chorus master)	Penderecki Conducts Penderecki, Volume 1	Won
2017	Best Opera Recording	Antonio Pappano (conductor); Georgia Jarman, Mariusz Kwiecień & Saimir Pirgu (soloists); Jonathan Allen (producer)	Szymanowski: Król Roger	Nominated
2018	Best Opera Recording	Gianandrea Noseda (conductor)/Metropolitan Opera Orchestra; Metropolitan Opera Choir (Note: Mariusz Kwiecień was one of four soloists who performed on this production.)	Bizet: Les pêcheurs de perles	Nominated
2021	Best Opera Recording	Jakub Józef Orliński	Handel: Agrippina	Nominated
2023	Best Opera Recording	Jakub Józef Orliński	Aucoin: Eurydice	Nominated
