= Ana Baron =

Argentine writer and journalist

- Born: Ana Carmen Baron Supervielle; 19 January 1950; Buenos Aires, Argentina
- Died: 21 August 2015 (aged 65); New York City, United States
- Education: Fondation National Sciences Politiques
- Occupations: Writer, journalist
- Spouse: Pablo Spiller
- Awards: King of Spain International Journalism Prize

Ana Carmen Baron Supervielle (19 January 1950 – 21 August 2015) was an Argentine writer and journalist, a correspondent for Clarín in her last 15 years.

== Biography ==
The violent political turbulence of Argentina in the 1970s led Ana Baron to settle in Paris, where she graduated from the School for Advanced Studies in the Social Sciences and the Fondation National Sciences Politiques. In those years she became a correspondent of Editorial Atlántida, together with her colleagues Danielle Raymond and Silvina Lanús.

Beginning in 1985, she resided in the United States. Her colleagues recalled an anecdote from 1986:

When José López Rega was arrested in Miami, a group of Argentines went to the jail to try to interview him. That monster did not want to give interviews and journalists were invited to leave the area, accompanied by an artillery jeep. A few kilometers away, those on television turned on their cameras for other colleagues to give testimony. Ana, with her voice that sometimes knew stridency, proclaimed: "Oh, no. When journalists interview journalists, it's time to go home." She got into her car and they did not see her anymore.

In the 1990s, she joined the already created Journalists' Association of Argentina, of which she was a member until November 2004, when she was part of the collective that resigned before its imminent dissolution.

From 1998 to 2013, she was the Washington, D.C. correspondent of the Buenos Aires newspaper Clarín, for which she had been a columnist in preceding years from New York.

In 1999, she was part of the group awarded by King Juan Carlos for an investigation in the Clarín supplement Zona on the secret reports of the US Embassy.

Baron covered Bill Clinton's presidential campaigns, George W. Bush's presidency, and the rise of Barack Obama.

She had broad access to State Department sources, and her articles made it clear that what was sometimes taken in Buenos Aires as support from Washington, was not.

She was sent to international summits: those of the presidents of the region, those of the Group of 20, and the assemblies of the IMF, among others. Her notes on Bush's reaction to the Mar del Plata summit in 2005 anticipated the fall of the Free Trade Area of the Americas (FTAA), a scoop reprinted by newspapers around the world.

== Radio ==
Baron was part of the program Corresponsales en línea on the Buenos Aires station Radio de la Ciudad (1110 AM) on Sundays from 10 am to 12 pm, along with Silvia Naishtat (Buenos Aires), Sofía Neiman (Buenos Aires), Paula Lugones (Washington), Silvia Pisani (Washington), Danielle Raymond (Paris), and María Laura Avignolo (Paris/London).

== Personal life ==
Baron married economist Pablo Spiller. She was the sister of writer Silvia Barón Supervielle and the cousin of writer Odile Baron Supervielle.

== Death ==
Ana Baron died from cancer in New York City on 21 August 2015, aged 65.

== Books ==
- Les Enjeux de la guerre des Malouines (The Stakes of the Falklands War), 680 pages (1988)
- Bill Clinton: Keys to Understand His Government
- Why Are They Gone? A Study on the Argentinean Exile, Emecé Editores, Buenos Aires, ISBN 9789500414906 (1995)
