= Fonogrammi =

Fonogrammi, for flute and chamber orchestra, is a composition by Polish composer Krzysztof Penderecki. It was finished in 1961 and was published by Schott Music, even though it remained initially unpublished.

== Composition ==
The work was premiered in Venice, during the Venice Biennale, on April 24, 1961. The flautist on this occasion was Stanislaw Marona, to whom the work is dedicated, and the orchestra was the Krákow Chamber Orchestra under the baton of Andrzej Markowski. The composition is a sound study with no programme (or perhaps with a private programme not revealed by the composer), and has never had the score published.

== Analysis ==
Fonogrammi is a concertante work. It typically takes six to seven minutes to perform and is scored for three flutes, strings, harpsichord, and percussion, including piano. It opens with the sound of the gong and other clashing cymbals, which then makes way for a harpsichord solo, which then leads to the string section. After the glissandi of the strings, a central section with the cymbals and some pizzicati strings is presented, and then, the harpsichord, together with the rest of the orchestra, introduces the flute, which proceeds to perform a solo cadenza. Then, the percussion and the harpsichord, in a trembling manner, go on to the next section, recognisable for the use of the tubular bells. The work finishes with a solo flute in its lowest register, accompanied by the strings, the vibraphone and the vibraslap.
