= Linda Briceño =

- Origin: Caracas, Venezuela
- Occupations: musician, composer, producer
- Instruments: voice, trumpet
- Website: http://www.lindabriceno.com

Linda Briceño is a Venezuelan songwriter, trumpeter, producer and vocalist. She was awarded Producer of the Year at the 19th Annual Latin Grammy Awards, becoming the first woman ever to win the award.

== Background ==
Briceño grew up in Caracas, Venezuela, studying classical percussion and trumpet in El Sistema, an education program which also produced Gustavo Dudamel, Diego Matheuz, and Pedro Eustache. Under the mentorship of Mireya Cisneros, Alberto Vollmer, Juan Luis Guerra, and Arturo Sandoval, Briceño relocated to New York City in 2013.

In 2014, Briceño released Tiempo, landing herself Latin Grammy nominations for Best New Artist and Traditional Pop Vocal Album. In 2018, released the single "Eleven" under the name Ella Bric and the Hidden Figures, as well as producing MV Caldera's album Segundo Piso.

Year	Release	Role	Awards	Result
2014	Tiempo	artist	Latin Grammy, Traditional Pop Album	Nominated
2014	Tiempo	artist	Latin Grammy, Best New Artist	Nominated
2018	Eleven	artist, producer	Latin Grammy, Best Producer	Won
2018	Segundo Piso	producer	Latin Grammy, Best Producer	Won
2019	Balance	artist	Latin Grammy, Best Instrumental Album	Won
