= Las Manos de Filippi =

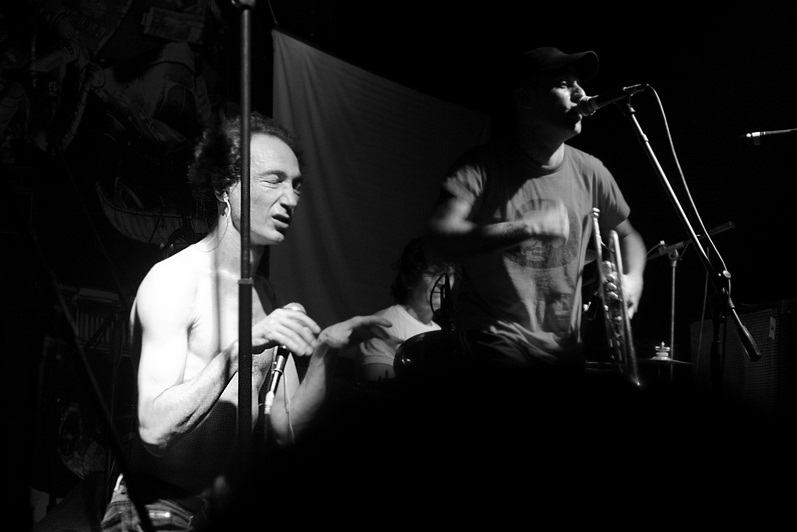
- Las Manos de Filippi in live, 2007.

Background information
- Origin: Buenos Aires, Argentina
- Genres: Punk, Cumbia, Hip hop, Alternative rock, Ska
- Years active: 1992–present
- Members: Hernán de Vega (voice); German Anzoátegui (trumpet); Charles Bardon (saxophone); Gaspar Benegas (guitar); Pablo Marchetti (keyboards); Lucas Honigman (drums); Guido Durán (bass)

Las Manos de Filippi (in English: The Hands of Filippi) and also LMF, is a group of Argentine rock fusion and alternative style, which blends Caribbean rhythms like cumbia, ska, hip hop, reggae and punk rock. His songs contain messages against capitalism, the International Monetary Fund and the political power shift, as well as a critical look at society, using as a basis the complaint, irony and humor. Its name comes sarcastically, by stealing the hands of Juan Domingo Perón and his fanaticism for the French band Mano Negra.

They are also known his membership with the Workers' Party and the defense to the working class.

Some of their songs are most widespread: «Sr. Cobranza» (popularized by Bersuit Vergarabat), «Los métodos piqueteros», «El himno del Cucumelo», «La canaleta», «Organización» and «Mountain bike».

== Discography ==
=== Studio albums ===
- V/A - Alta Atensión (1995)
- Agrupación Mamanis - Reír por no llorar (1996)
- Arriba las manos, esto es el Estado (1998)
- Hasta las manos (2002)
- Control obrero (2007)
- La calesita de Mamanis (2011)
- Marginal y popular (2014)

=== Live albums ===
- Fiesta señores (2004)
- Los métodos piqueteros (2008)
- 20 años (2012)

=== Extended play ===
- Las manos santas van a misa (2000)

== See also ==
- Argentine punk
