= Hussain Jiffry =

Sri Lankan born American bassist

Hussain Jiffry is a Sri Lankan born American bassist who performed on Herb Alpert’s album ‘’Steppin’ Out’’, which won Best Pop Instrumental Album Award at the 56th Grammy Awards in 2014. Education-Wesley college colombo

Jiffry started his music career while studying at Wesley College, Colombo. The first band he joined was Cats Eye fronted by fellow schoolmate Kamal Addararachchi. Later he joined Charade, then formed his own band Stratus co-led by Shiraaz Nooramith on drums and featuring Marino De Silva and Adrian De Silva. He later played for Noeline & Galaxy and while playing bass for Galaxy, was asked to join Fame led by Sheridan Lye to be their keyboard player and tour Europe. Three years later Jiffry joined Grace as their bass player, while the band was doing a stint in Switzerland. Jiffry later moved to the US to study music at the Musicians Institute in Hollywood. After he graduated, he decided to settle down in Los Angeles and got the opportunity to perform and record with celebrity artists such as Whitney Houston, Dionne Warwick, Michael Bolton, Bobby Brown, Captain & Tennille, Chaka Khan, Crystal Gayle, Carol King, Sergio Mendes, Yanni and many more. In recent years he has been touring with the legendary Herb Alpert.
