= Ganbaataryn Khongorzul =

- Birth name: Ganbaataryn Khongorzul
- Also known as: Khongorzul
- Born: 12 September 1974 (age 50)
- Origin: Mongolia
- Genres: Folk, World Music
- Occupation: Singer
- Years active: 1990–present

Ganbaataryn Khongorzul (Mongolian: Ганбаатарын Хонгорзул; * 7 April 1973) is a traditional long song singer from Mongolia.

== Life ==
Khongorzul was born in the Khentii Province. During adolescence she only sang for private entertainment. Then she auditioned for the Than Khentii Folk Ensemble and was accepted. From 1998, she studied at the University of Culture and Art in Ulaanbaatar. In the same year she won the first prize in the Ulaanbaatar Competition of Professional Longsong Singers. After that she performed as a soloist singer with the Mongolian Theater of National Dance and Folksong and the Traditional Music and Dance Theater both in Mongolia and abroad. Khongorzul performs with the famous Silk Road Ensemble led by the cellist Yo Yo Ma.

Khongorzul has sung for the opening of the Nobel Prizes and the opening of the 2002 World Cup. She has also performed at Albert Hall, Carnegie Hall, the Bolshoi and many other notable venues.

== Discography ==
- appears on Silk Road Journeys: When Strangers Meet (Yo Yo Ma 2002)
