= Odile Baron Supervielle =

Uruguayan-born Argentine writer and journalist

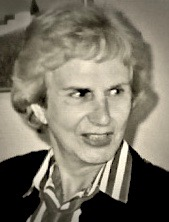
Odile Baron Supervielle (1975)

Odile Baron Supervielle (May 1, 1915 – October 25, 2016) was an Uruguayan-born Argentine writer and journalist. A pioneer of women journalists in Argentina, she was director of the literary supplement of the newspaper La Nación.

== Biography ==
Odile Baron Supervielle was born in Montevideo, Uruguay, May 1, 1915. She was the fourth of the six children of the French banker Etienne Baron Lamothe and the Uruguayan Ana Supervielle Munyo. Odile's siblings were Santiago, Andrés, Victoria, Susana and Colette. She is the niece and goddaughter of Jules Supervielle. Other relations include: Susana Baron Supervielle, Ana Baron Supervielle, Silvia Baron Supervielle, Gloria Alcorta, and Oliverio Girondo.

Baron Supervielle was a writer and journalist for the daily La Nación, La Prensa, and other publications. She contributed to various South American and European publications. She interviewed personalities of Argentine and European culture and science, such as Jorge Luis Borges, Julio Cortázar, Adolfo Bioy Casares, Pablo Neruda, André Malraux, Manuel Mujica Lainez, Eduardo Mallea, Ernesto Sabato, Francois Truffaut, Edgardo Cozarinsky, Leopoldo Marechal, Jean Hamburger, Susan Sontag, Françoise Héritier, Abate Pierre, María Rosa Gallo, Alberto Girri, Juan Carlos Paz, Marguerite Duras, Jorge Semprún, Astor Piazzolla, Miguel Ocampo, Jorge de la Vega, Sebastian Spreng, Jean-Gilles de Gènes, and Salvador Dalí. The digitized archive of her interviews is held in a collection at Villa Ocampo.

In 1970, with Silvia Ambrosini and Germaine Derbecq, she co-founded ARTINF magazine. In 2002, Baron Supervielle published Alberti en Buenos Aires.

Odile Baron Supervielle died in Buenos Aires, October 25, 2016.

== Awards and honours ==
In 1999, Baron Supervielle was awarded the Enrique Fernández Latour Prize for Argentine-French friendship in criticism and dissemination.
