= List of Mexican Grammy Award winners and nominees =

The following is a list of Grammy Awards winners and nominees from Mexico:

Nominee	Wins	Nominations
Los Tigres del Norte	7	16
Luis Miguel	6	15
Natalia Lafourcade	4	9
Pepe Aguilar	4	7
Maná	4	6
Vicente Fernandez	3	13
Ramon Ayala	2	8
Little Joe y La Familia	2	3
Alan Saucedo	2	2
Julieta Venegas	1	4
La Santa Cecilia; Lila Downs	1	3
Aida Cuevas; Rodrigo Cuevas; Jesse & Joy; Peso Pluma	1	2
Juan Gabriel; Banda el Preciado; Marco Antonio Solis	0	6
Los Tucanes de Tijuana	0	5
El Tri; Joan Sebastian; Cristian Castro; Akwid	0	4
Los Bukis; Alejando Fernandez; Paquita La Del Barrio; Cuisillos; Lupillo Rivera	0	3
Los Yonic's; El Chapo de Sinaloa; El Güero y Su Banda Centenario; La Arrolladora Banda El Limónde Rene Camacho; Los Rieleros del Norte; Joss Favela Paulina Rubio	0	2
Camilo Lara; Gustavo Galindo; Michael Salgado; Los Pikadientes; Huichol Musical; Nadia Lopez; Yolanda Del Rio; Consuelo Silva; Juan Valentin; Rafael Buendia; Antonio Aguilar Ángela Aguilar; Chavela y Su Grupo; Los Diablos; Los Freddy's; Jose Javier Solis; Pio Trevino y Majic; Narciso Martinez; Grupo Bronco; Mariachi Sol de Mexico; Ana Bárbara; Alicia Villarreal; Sones de México Ensemble Chicago; El Potro de Sinaloa; Valentín Elizalde; K-Paz de la Sierra; Alacranes Musical; La Original Banda El Limón de Salvador Lizárraga; Camila	0	1
