= List of Cuban Grammy Award winners and nominees =

The following is a list of Grammy Awards winners and nominees from Cuba:

Year	Category	Nominees(s)	Nominated for	Result
1976	Best Latin Recording	Mongo Santamaría	Afro-Indio	Nominated
1977	Best Latin Recording	Mongo Santamaría	Sofrito	Nominated
1978	Best Latin Recording	Mongo Santamaría	Dawn	Won
1979	Best Latin Recording	Mongo Santamaría	Mongo A La Carte	Nominated
1980	Best Latin Recording	Irakere	Irakere	Won
1981	Best Latin Recording	Irakere	Irakere 2	Nominated
1984	Best Tropical Latin Performance	Mongo Santamaría	Mongo Magic	Nominated
1986	Best Tropical Latin Performance	Mongo Santamaría	Espiritu Libre	Nominated
1988	Best Latin Pop Performance	Maria Conchita Alonso	Otra Mentira Mas	Nominated
1990	Best Tropical Latin Performance	Celia Cruz and Ray Barretto	Ritmo en el Corazón	Won
1993	Best Latin Pop Album	Jon Secada	Otro Día Más Sin Verte	Won
1994	Best Latin Pop Album	Maria Conchita Alonso	Imáginame	Nominated
1996	Best Latin Pop Album	Jon Secada	Amor	Won
1996	Best Contemporary Jazz Album	Pat Metheny Group (Note: The Pat Metheny Group is an American jazz fusion group. Luis Conte was one of the percussionists that performed on the album.)	We Live Here	Won
1998 Grammy Award	Best Traditional Tropical Latin Album	Buena Vista Social Club	Buena Vista Social Club	Won
1999	Best Tropical Latin Performance	Chucho Valdés and Irakere	Babalú Ayé	Nominated
2003	Best Salsa Album	Celia Cruz	La Negra Tiene Tumbao	Won
2003	Best Salsa/Nerengue Album	Celia Cruz	Regalo del Alma	Won
2003	Best Latin Pop Album	Jorge Moreno	Moreno	Nominated
2004	Best Salsa/Merengue Album	Celia Cruz	Regalo del Alma	Won
2007	Best Latin Pop Album	Fulano	Individual	Nominated
2010	Best Contemporary World Music Album	Omar Sosa	Across the Divide: A Tale of Rhythm & Ancestry	Nominated
2011	Best Latin Pop Album	Alex Cuba	Alex Cuba	Nominated
2015	Best World Music Album	Wu Man, Luis Conte and Daniel Ho (Note: Wu Man is a Chinese musician and Daniel Ho is an American musician.)	Our World in Song	Nominated
2016	Grammy Lifetime Achievement Award	Celia Cruz		Won
2016	Best Latin Pop Album	Alex Cuba	Healer	Nominated
2018	Best Latin Pop Album	Alex Cuba	Lo Único Constante	Nominated
2019	Best Pop Vocal Album	Camila Cabello	Camila	Nominated
2019	Best Pop Solo Performance	Camila Cabello	Havana (Live)	Nominated
