= Janet Robin =

American musician (born 1966)

- Robin on tour in Germany (2016)

Background information
- Born: 1966 (age 59–60); Los Angeles, California, United States
- Genres: Rock, electroacoustic, pop music Americana blues
- Occupations: Guitarist, singer, songwriter, film and TV composer, guitar coach
- Instruments: Vocals, acoustic guitar, electric guitar, banjitar
- Years active: 1982–present
- Labels: Little Sister Records, Hypertension Music (EU), Polygram Records, Capitol/Chameleon Records
- Past members: Jennifer Oberle, Steve Fekete, Shay Godwin, Dan Potruch, Joe Travers, Bryan Beller, Mark Karan, Rick Musalam
- Website: www.janetrobin.com

Janet Robin (born 1966) is an American guitarist, singer, songwriter, film and television composer, and guitar coach. Robin was named on the Top 50 Acoustic Guitarists Bonus List in Guitar Player in 2017.

== Early life ==
Robin grew up in North Hollywood, California where she and her older brother Steve began taking acoustic folk guitar lessons at Valley Arts Guitar. When Steve wanted to begin playing electric guitar, the Robins were both referred to a North Hollywood music school owned by Delores Rhoads called Musonia School of Music. At Musonia, Robin took electric guitar lessons as the youngest and only female guitar student of Delores's son, Quiet Riot guitarist Randy Rhoads. Robin continued taking lessons from Rhoads until he joined Ozzy Osbourne's band as lead guitarist.

== Career ==
=== Precious Metal ===
Robin began performing professionally at the age of 16 in the mid-1980s playing guitar in the all-female hard rock band Precious Metal which she joined in February 1984. The band performed at Los Angeles venues such as FM Station, Club Lingerie, Whisky a Go Go and The Roxy. This exposure brought Precious Metal to the attention of influential KROQ radio disc jockey Rodney Bingenheimer, who played their music on his radio program. Russ Regan, head of Polygram Records, signed the band soon afterwards, and Precious Metal released their debut record Right Here, Right Now in 1985 on Mercury Records. After leaving Polygram, the band was picked up by Capitol Records subsidiary label Chameleon who released their final two albums That Kind of Girl in 1988 and Precious Metal in 1990. While in Precious Metal, Robin wrote songs with members of Heart, Poison and Cheap Trick.

Precious Metal recorded a cover of the Jean Knight song, "Mr. Big Stuff" for their 1990 self-titled album. Donald Trump originally made an appearance in the music video. However, Trump wanted a $250,000 payment instead of the agreed-upon $10,000 appearance fee. After the band refused to pay for his appearance, Trump was replaced in the final version of the music video.

=== Lindsey Buckingham and touring ===
After Chameleon Records went bankrupt and Precious Metal broke up in 1991, Robin started a duo with Precious Metal lead singer Leslie Knauer called Sugar Shack while also playing session gigs. In 1992, she became a full-time member of Fleetwood Mac guitarist Lindsey Buckingham's band, touring extensively behind his solo album Out of the Cradle as both a headline act and in support of Tina Turner. Robin's first gig with Buckingham was a live performance on The Tonight Show with Jay Leno one week after she joined the band. Robin performed with Buckingham until 1994.

In addition to performing with Buckingham, Robin also appeared as a guitarist for several artists including Meredith Brooks, Michelle Shocked, Alice Peacock and Sarah Bettens. From 2008 to 2009 she was a touring member of Air Supply.

=== Solo career ===
Robin has recorded and released solo albums on her own imprint, Little Sister Records. In 1998, she recorded and released her first album Open the Door which was produced by Mark Karan of Bob Weir & Rat Dog. Robin joined Ann & Nancy Wilson of Heart for an acoustic performance which led to a write up in music industry trade publication Radio & Records and earned her industry attention. She continued to record and release her own material expanding her touring up the West Coast and eventually to the East Coast. Robin has co-written songs with several artists including Maia Sharp, Garrison Starr, and Sue Ennis. Her song Personal Revolution appeared on the Girls Night Out, Vol. 5 (2004, Genius Entertainment) compilation CD.

In 2007, Robin began working with producers David Bianco and Steve Baughman on an EP entitled Days of Summer. Through Baughman she met Czech band November 2 on MySpace and travelled to the Czech Republic to tour with them. This led to subsequent European tours with Robin expanding her touring to Germany, France and the U.K. She has performed in Europe in support of several artists including Tommy Emmanuel, Midge Ure and Lenka Filipová.

In 2009, Robin met up with producer John Carter Cash to record her album Everything Has Changed. Robin raised $16,000 in fan donations to record the album. Everything Has Changed was released in 2010 by German record label Hypertension Music who she was introduced to by Colin Hay. Robin released the album in the U.S. on Little Sister Records in 2012. In 2013, Robin released her first live recording, "Janet Robin & Band, Live in France," which featured a live show recording at a blues club in France with her French band. The album was produced and mixed by famed French guitarist, Charlie Fabert.

In 2016, Robin again raised fan donations and recorded Take Me As I Am with John Carter Cash as executive producer and Chuck Turner as Producer and Engineer at Cash Cabin Studio near Nashville. In 2018 she released a digital single-an instrumental version of "Here Comes the Sun".

=== The String Revolution ===
The String Revolution is a project started by Robin featuring four international guitar players playing mostly original instrumental pieces of all genres. Their first EP Stringborn was released in October 2016, mixed and mastered by Matt Hyde (Rodrigo y Gabriela). Their follow-up EP, Red Drops, was released in 2019.

In 2023, The String Revolution recorded another cover song, this time “Folsom Prison Blues.” It was produced by Johnny Cash’s and June Carter’s son, John Carter Cash, and recorded at the Cash Cabin Studio in Nashville, Tennessee. Their special guest was a guitarist Tommy Emmanuel. Their arrangement and recording had received Grammy® Nomination and a win in “Best Arrangement, Instrumental or A Cappella” category.

=== Film and TV composing ===
Robin has composed scores for the short films, "Traces", "War of Art," and "Use Me Up." Robin contributed guitar to Michelle Shocked's score for the documentary Bush's Brain. She has had songs placed on several TV shows, including One Life to Live, All My Children, The Oprah Winfrey Show and Felicity. Her song "On My Feet Again" appeared in the short film comedy "Casting All Corpses: An Actor's Memorial" which won Best Comedy Short at The Hollywood Reel Film Festival.

Robin was the guitar coach for Quentin Tarantino's 2015 film The Hateful Eight. She taught actress Jennifer Jason Leigh how to play guitar. Leigh was nominated for the Best Performance by an Actress in a Supporting Role for her performance in the film.

== Discography ==
- 1998: Open the Door (Renaissance Records)
- 2001: Out From Under (Little Sister Records)
- 2004: After The Flood (Little Sister Records)
- 2007: Days of Summer – EP (Little Sister Records)
- 2010: Everything Has Changed (Hypertension Music)
- 2012: Everything Has Changed (Little Sister Records)
- 2013: Live in France (Little Sister Records)
- 2016: Stringborn, The String Revolution (String Revolution Music)
- 2016: Take Me As I Am (Little Sister Records)
- 2018: "Here Comes the Sun" (Little Sister Records), Instrumental Single
- 2019: Red Drops, The String Revolution (String Revolution Music)
- 2023: Folsom Prison Blues, The String Revolution (String Revolution Music)
