= List of Japanese Grammy Award winners and nominees =

The following is a list of Grammy Awards winners and nominees from Japan:

Year	Category	Nominees(s)	Nominated for	Result
1987	Packaging and notes	Eiko Ishioka (art director)	Tutu	Won
1989	Best Score Soundtrack for Visual Media	Various artists (Note: For The Last Emperor, various artists include David Byrne, Cong Su, and Ryuichi Sakamoto)	The Last Emperor	Won
2001	Best New Age Album	Kitarō	Thinking of You	Won
2011	Best Pop Instrumental Album	Larry Carlton (Note: Larry Carlton is an American musician.) and Tak Matsumoto	Take Your Pick	Won
2011	Best Instrumental Soloist(s) Performance (with Orchestra)	Mitsuko Uchida	Mozart: "Piano Concertos Nos. 23 & 24"	Won
2016	Best Opera Recording	Seiji Ozawa (conductor) and Saito Kinen Orchestra	Ravel: L'enfant et les sortilèges; Shéhérazade	Won
