= List of German Grammy Award winners and nominees =

The following is a list of Grammy Awards winners and nominees from Germany:

Year	Category	Nominee(s)	Nominated for	Result
1963	Best Choral Performance	Otto Klemperer	St Matthew Passion (Bach)	Won
1966	Best Opera Recording	Dietrich Fischer-Dieskau	Wozzeck (Berg)	Won
1966	Best Opera Recording	Fritz Wunderlich	Wozzeck (Berg)	Won
1967	Best Recording Package	Klaus Voormann	Revolver (The Beatles)	Won
1973	Album of the Year	Klaus Voormann	The Concert for Bangladesh	Won
1975	Best Album Notes	Ulf Hoelscher	The Classic Erich Wolfgang Korngold	Won
1976	Best R&B Instrumental Performance	Silver Convention	Fly, Robin, Fly	Won
1978	Best Classical Album	Dietrich Fischer-Dieskau	Concert of the Century	Won
1979	Best Orchestral Performance	Berlin Philharmonic	Symphonies 1-9 (Beethoven)	Won
1980	Best Arrangement, Instrumental or A Cappella	Claus Ogerman	Soulful Strut (George Benson)	Won
1982	Best Rock Instrumental Performance	Kraftwerk	"Computer World"	Nominated
1986	Best Score Soundtrack for Visual Media	Harold Faltermeyer	Beverly Hills Cop	Won
1990	Best New Artist	Milli Vanilli	Milli Vanilli	Won (revoked on 20 November 1990)
1994	Best Instrumental Soloist(s) Performance (with orchestra)	Anne-Sophie Mutter	Violin Concerto/Rihm: Time Chant (Berg)	Won
1994	Best Arrangement, Instrumental and Vocals	Hans Zimmer	The Lion King	Won
1994	Best Musical Album for Children	Hans Zimmer	The Lion King	Won
1995	Best Chamber Music Performance	Hansjörg Schellenberger	Beethoven/Mozart: Quintets (Chicago-Berlin)	Won
1996	Best Score Soundtrack for Visual Media	Hans Zimmer	Crimson Tide	Won
1998	Best Opera Recording	René Pape	Die Meistersinger von Nürnberg (Wagner)	Won
2000	Best Classical Vocal Performance	Berlin Philharmonic	Des Knaben Wunderhorn (Mahler)	Won
2000	Best Classical Vocal Performance	Thomas Quasthoff	Des Knaben Wunderhorn (Mahler)	Won
2000	Best Chamber Music Performance	Anne-Sophie Mutter	The Violin Sonatas (Beethoven)	Won
2001	Best Orchestral Performance	Berlin Philharmonic	Sym. No. 10 (Mahler)	Won
2001	Best Small Ensemble Performance	Philipp Nedel	After Mozart (Raskatov, Silvestrov & Schnittke)	Won
2001	Best Choral Performance	Helmuth Rilling	Credo (Penderecki)	Won
2002	Best Choral Performance	Dorothea Röschmann	St Matthew Passion (Bach)	Won
2003	Best Opera Recording	René Pape	Tannhäuser (Wagner)	Won
2004	Best Classical Vocal Performance	Thomas Quasthoff	Lieder mit Orchester (Schubert)	Won
2005	Best Instrumental Arrangement	Chris Walden	Cherokee (Chris Walden Big Band)	Nominated
2005	Best Large Jazz Ensemble Album	Chris Walden Big Band	Home of My Heart	Nominated
2005	Best Instrumental Soloist(s) Performance (with orchestra)	Anne-Sophie Mutter	Serenade (Bernstein)	Won
2006	Best Opera Recording	Valerie Gross	Ainadamar ("Fountain of Tears") (Golijov)	Won
2006	Best Electronic/Dance Album	Kraftwerk	Minimum-Maximum	Nominated
2006	Best Classical Vocal Performance	Thomas Quasthoff	Bach cantata (Bach)	Won
2006	Best Orchestral Performance	Bavarian Radio Symphony Orchestra	Sym. No. 13 (Shostakovich)	Won
2007	Best Small Ensemble Performance	Philipp Nedel	Apollo, Concerto in D (Stravinsky); 20 Visions fugitives (Prokofiev)	Won
2008	Best Classical Contemporary Composition	Chris Walden	Symphony No. 1, The Four Elements	Nominated
2008	Best Orchestral Performance	Chris Walden	Symphony No. 1, The Four Elements	Nominated
2008	Best Choral Performance	Thomas Quasthoff	A German Requiem (Brahms)	Won
2009	Best Score Soundtrack for Visual Media	Hans Zimmer	The Dark Knight	Won
2010	Best Arrangement, Instrumental and Vocals	Claus Ogerman	Quiet Nights (Diana Krall)	Won
2010	Lifetime Achievement Award	André Previn	André Previn	Won
2011	Best Opera Recording	Deutsches Symphonie-Orchester Berlin	L'Amour de loin (Saariaho)	Won
2011	Best Opera Recording	Berlin Radio Choir	L'Amour de loin (Saariaho)	Won
2013	Best Arrangement Accompanying Vocalist(s)	Chris Walden	Let's Fall in Love (Calabria Foti & Seth MacFarlane)	Nominated
2014	Best Arrangement, Instrumental or A Cappella	Chris Walden	Moon River (Amy Dickson)	Nominated
2014	Best Classical Compendium	Christoph Eschenbach	Violinkonzert; Symphonic Metamorphosis; Konzertmusik (Hindemith)	Won
2014	Best Classical Compendium	NDR Elbphilharmonie Orchestra	Violinkonzert; Symphonic Metamorphosis; Konzertmusik (Hindemith)	Won
2014	Lifetime Achievement Award	Kraftwerk	Kraftwerk	Won
2014	Best Dance Recording	Zedd	Clarity	Won
2015	Best Opera Recording	Renate Wolter-Seevers	La descente d'Orphée aux enfers (Charpentier)	Won
2016	Best Classical Instrumental Solo	Augustin Hadelich	Violin concerto, l'arbre des songes (Dutilleux)	Won
2017	Best Arrangement, Instrumental or A Cappella	Chris Walden	White Christmas (Herb Alpert)	Nominated
2017	Best Classical Vocal Solo	Dorothea Röschmann	Schumann & Berg	Won
2017	Best Historical Album	Robert Russ	Vladimir Horowitz – The Unreleased Live Recordings 1966–1983	Nominated
2018	Best Historical Album	Martin Kistner	Leonard Bernstein – The Composer	Won
2018	Best Historical Album	Robert Russ	Leonard Bernstein – The Composer	Won
2018	Best Historical Album	Robert Russ	Glenn Gould – The Goldberg Variations – The Complete Unreleased Recording Sessions 1955	Nominated
2018	Best Historical Album	Martin Kistner	Glenn Gould – The Goldberg Variations – The Complete Unreleased Recording Sessions 1955	Nominated
2018	Best Electronic/Dance Album	Kraftwerk	3-D The Catalogue	Won
2018	Best Surround Sound Album	Kraftwerk	Fritz Hilpert, Tom Ammermann for 3-D The Catalogue	Nominated
2018	Best Opera Recording	Anne Schwanewilms	Wozzeck (Berg)	Won
2018	Best Opera Recording	Roman Trekel	Wozzeck (Berg)	Won
2019	Best Historical Album	Robert Russ	A Rhapsody In Blue – The Extraordinary Life of Oscar Levant	Nominated
2020	Best Historical Album	Robert Russ	The Great Comeback: Horowitz At Carnegie Hall	Nominated
2022	Best Historical Album	Robert Russ	Marian Anderson – Beyond The Music: Her Complete RCA Victor Recordings	Nominated
2023	Best Historical Album	Robert Russ	Glenn Gould –The Goldberg Variations –The Complete Unreleased 1981 Studio Sessions	Nominated
2023	Best Pop Duo/Group Performance	Kim Petras (with Sam Smith)	"Unholy"	Won
2023	Grammy Award for Best Remixed Recording, Non-Classical	Purple Disco Machine	"About Damn Time (Purple Disco Machine Remix)"	Won
