= List of Italian Grammy Award winners and nominees =

The following is a list of Grammy Awards winners and nominees from Italy:

Year	Category	Nominees(s)	Nominated for	Result
1959	Record of the Year	Domenico Modugno	"Nel blu, dipinto di blu"	Won
1959	Song of the Year	Domenico Modugno	"Nel blu, dipinto di blu"	Won
1959	Best Vocal Performance, Male	Domenico Modugno	"Nel blu, dipinto di blu"	Nominated
1959	Best Classical Performance - Vocal Soloist (With Or Without Orchestra)	Renata Tebaldi	Operatic Recital	Won
1962	Best Instrumental Theme Or Instrumental Version Of Song	Nino Rota	La Dolce Vita	Nominated
1962	Best Sound Track Album Or Recording Of Score From Motion Picture Or Television	Nino Rota	La Dolce Vita (Motion Picture)	Nominated
1962	Best Opera Recording	Carlo Maria Giulini	Mozart: The Marriage Of Figaro (Album)	Nominated
1964	Best Instrumental Composition	Riz Ortolani and Nino Oliviero	"More" (Theme song from Mondo Cane)	Won
1964	Best Original Score From A Motion Picture Or Television Show	Riz Ortolani and Nino Oliviero	Mondo Cane (Album)	Nominated
1965	Album Of The Year - Classical	Carlo Maria Giulini	Verdi: Requiem (Album)	Nominated
1965	Best Choral Performance (Other Than Opera)	Carlo Maria Giulini	Verdi: Requiem Mass (Album)	Nominated
1969	Best Instrumental Theme	Ennio Morricone	The Good, The Bad And The Ugly	Nominated
1970	Song Of The Year	Nino Rota	"A Time For Us" (Love Theme From Romeo And Juliet) (Single)	Nominated
1971	Best Classical Performance, Orchestra	Carlo Maria Giulini	Berlioz: Romeo And Juliet (Album)	Nominated
1972	Best Orchestral Performance	Carlo Maria Giulini	Mahler: Symphony No. 1 in D	Won
1972	Album Of The Year, Classical	Carlo Maria Giulini	Mahler: Symphony No. 1 In D Major (Album)	Nominated
1972	Best Opera Recording	Carlo Maria Giulini	Verdi: Don Carlo (Album)	Nominated
1973	Best Original Score Written For A Motion Picture Or A Television Special	Nino Rota	The Godfather	Won
1973	Best Instrumental Composition	Nino Rota	Theme From The Godfather	Nominated
1973	Best Original Score Written For A Motion Picture Or A Television Special	Manuel De Sica	The Garden Of The Finzi Continis (Album)	Nominated
1974	Best Classical Performance Instrumental Soloist Or Soloists (Without Orchestra)	Maurizio Pollini	Chopin: Etudes (Album)	Nominated
1976	Best Choral Performance, Classical (Other Than Opera)	Riccardo Muti	Cherubini: Requiem In D Minor For Male Chorus And Orchestra (Album)	Nominated
1977	Best Choral Performance, Classical (Other Than Opera)	Carlo Maria Giulini	Beethoven: Missa Solemnis (Album)	Nominated
1977	Best Classical Performance, Instrumental Soloist Or Soloists (Without Orchestra)	Maurizio Pollini	Chopin: Preludes, Op.28 (Album)	Nominated
1978	Best Classical Performance Instrumental Soloist Or Soloists (With Orchestra)	Maurizio Pollini	Beethoven: Piano Concerto No. 4 In G (Album)	Nominated
1978	Best Classical Vocal Soloist Performance	Luciano Pavarotti	Luciano Pavarotti - O Holy Night	Nominated
1978	Best Orchestral Performance	Carlo Maria Giulini	Mahler: Symphony No. 9 in D	Won
1978	Album Of The Year, Classical	Carlo Maria Giulini	Mahler: Symphony No. 9 In D Major (Album)	Nominated
1979	Best Album of Original Score Written for a Motion Picture or a Television Special	Giorgio Moroder	Midnight Express	Nominated
1979	Best Classical Vocal Soloist Performance	Luciano Pavarotti	Luciano Pavarotti - Hits from Lincoln Center	Won
1979	Album Of The Year Classical	Carlo Maria Giulini	Brahms: Concerto For Violin In D	Won
1979	Album Of The Year Classical	Carlo Maria Giulini	Dvorák: Symphony No. 9 In E Minor ("New World")	Nominated
1979	Best Classical Orchestral Performance	Carlo Maria Giulini	Bruckner: Symphony No. 9 In D Minor (Album)	Nominated
1979	Best Choral Performance, Classical (Other Than Opera)	Riccardo Muti	Vivaldi: Gloria In D Major And Magnificat (Album)	Nominated
1979	Best Classical Performance, Instrumental Soloist(s) (Without Orchestra)	Maurizio Pollini	Beethoven: The Late Piano Sonatas (Album)	Nominated
1980	Best Classical Performance, Instrumental Soloist(s) (Without Orchestra)	Maurizio Pollini	Boulez: Sonata For Piano No. 2 (Album)	Nominated
1980	Best Classical Performance - Instrumental Soloist Or Soloists (With Orchestra)	Maurizio Pollini	Bartók: Piano Cons. Nos. 1 & 2	Won
1980	Album of the Year	Giorgio Moroder	Bad Girls (Note: Moroder was the album's producer.)	Nominated
1980	Best Disco Recording	Giorgio Moroder	Bad Girls	Nominated
1980	Best Classical Vocal Soloist Performance	Luciano Pavarotti	O sole mio - Favorite Neapolitan Songs	Won
1980	Best Classical Album	Riccardo Muti	Mussorgsky-Ravel: Pictures At An Exhibition/Stravinsky: The Firebird Suite (Album)	Nominated
1981	Best Choral Performance, Classical (Other Than Opera)	Carlo Maria Giulini	Mozart: Requiem	Won
1982	Best Classical Vocal Soloist Performance	Luciano Pavarotti	Live from Lincoln Center - Sutherland/Horne/Pavarotti	Won
1982	Best Classical Album	Luciano Pavarotti	Live from Lincoln Center - Sutherland/Horne/Pavarotti	Nominated
1984	Best Instrumental Composition	Giorgio Moroder	"Love Theme from Flashdance"	Won
1984	Best Album of Original Score Written for a Motion Picture or a Television Special	Giorgio Moroder	Flashdance	Won
1984	Album of the Year	Giorgio Moroder	Flashdance	Nominated
1984	Record of the Year	Giorgio Moroder	"Flashdance... What a Feeling" (Note: Moroder co-wrote the song with Irene Cara and Keith Forsey. He was also the song's producer.)	Nominated
1984	Best Classical Album	Carlo Maria Giulini	Verdi: Falstaff (Album)	Nominated
1984	Best Opera Recording	Carlo Maria Giulini	Verdi: Falstaff (Album)	Nominated
1984	Best Classical Orchestral Recording	Carlo Maria Giulini	Beethoven: Symphony No. 5 In C Minor, Op. 67 (Album)	Nominated
1985	Best Opera Recording	Riccardo Muti	Verdi: Ernani (Album)	Nominated
1987	Best Opera Recording	Luciano Pavarotti	Verdi: Un ballo in maschera (The Masked Ball)	Nominated
1987	Best Classical Vocal Soloist Performance	Luciano Pavarotti	Passione Pavarotti (Favorite Neapolitan Love Songs)	Nominated
1987	Grammy Lifetime Achievement Award	Enrico Caruso		Won
1987	Grammy Lifetime Achievement Award	Arturo Toscanini		Won
1987	Best Classical Orchestral Recording	Riccardo Muti	Respighi: The Pines Of Rome, The Fountains Of Rome, Roman Festivals (Album)	Nominated
1987	Best Choral Performance (Other Than Opera)	Riccardo Muti	Berlioz: Romeo Et Juliette (Album)	Nominated
1988	Best Album Or Original Instrumental Background Score Written For A Motion Picture Or Television	Ennio Morricone	The Untouchables	Won
1988	Best Opera Recording	Riccardo Muti	Mozart: The Marriage Of Figaro (Album)	Nominated
1989	Best Opera Recording	Luciano Pavarotti	Bellini: Norma	Nominated
1989	Best Opera Recording	Luciano Pavarotti	Mozart: Idomeneo	Nominated
1989	Best Classical Vocal Soloist Performance	Luciano Pavarotti	Luciano Pavarotti in Concert	Won
1989	Best Classical Album	Carlo Maria Giulini	Horowitz Plays Mozart (Album)	Nominated
1989	Best Classical Performance - Instrumental Soloist(s) (Without Orchestra)	Maurizio Pollini	Schubert: The Late Piano Sonatas (Album)	Nominated
1991	Best Opera Recording	Riccardo Muti	Verdi: Attila (Album)	Nominated
1991	Best Classical Vocal Performance	Luciano Pavarotti	Carreras, Domingo, Pavarotti in Concert	Won
1991	Best Classical Album	Luciano Pavarotti	Carreras, Domingo, Pavarotti in Concert	Nominated
1993	Best Classical Album	Cecilia Bartoli	Cecilia Bartoli: Rossini Heroines (Album)	Nominated
1993	Best Classical Vocal Performance	Cecilia Bartoli	Cecilia Bartoli: Rossini Heroines	Nominated
1994	Best Classical Album	Cecilia Bartoli	If You Love Me (18th Century Italian Songs)	Nominated
1994	Best Opera Recording	Riccardo Muti	Gluck: Iphigenie En Tauride	Nominated
1995	Album of the Year	Luciano Pavarotti	The 3 Tenors in Concert 1994 (Album)	Nominated
1995	Best Pop Album	Luciano Pavarotti	The 3 Tenors in Concert 1994 (Album)	Nominated
1995	Best Classical Vocal Performance	Cecilia Bartoli	The Impatient Lover - Italian Songs By Beethoven, Schubert, Mozart	Won
1995	Best Instrumental Composition Written For A Motion Picture Or For Television	Ennio Morricone	Wolf	Nominated
1996	Best Opera Recording	Cecilia Bartoli	Mozart: La Clemenza Di Tito (Album)	Nominated
1997	Best Pop Collaboration with Vocals	Luciano Pavarotti	"My Way" (Track)	Nominated
1997	Best Choral Performance	Carlo Maria Giulini	Schubert: Mass In E Flat (Album)	Nominated
1997	Best Instrumental Composition Written For A Motion Picture Or For Television	Ennio Morricone	The Star Maker	Nominated
1998	Best Dance Recording	Giorgio Moroder	"Carry On" (Note: Moroder co-wrote the song with Donna Summer and was the song's producer.)	Won
1998	MusiCares Person of the Year	Luciano Pavarotti		Won
1998	Grammy Legend Award	Luciano Pavarotti		Won
1998	Best Classical Vocal Performance	Cecilia Bartoli	An Italian Songbook - Works Of Bellini, Donizetti, Rossini	Won
1999	Best Instrumental Composition Written For A Motion Picture Or For Television	Ennio Morricone	Bulworth	Nominated
1999	Best New Artist	Andrea Bocelli		Nominated
2000	Best Male Pop Vocal Performance	Andrea Bocelli	"Sogno" (Track)	Nominated
2000	Best Pop Collaboration With Vocals	Andrea Bocelli	"The Prayer" (Track)	Nominated
2001	Best Dance Recording	Eiffel 65	"Blue (Da Ba Dee)"	Nominated
2001	Best Classical Vocal Performance	Cecilia Bartoli	The Vivaldi Album - Dell'aura al sussurrar, Alma oppressa	Won
2002	Best Classical Vocal Performance	Cecilia Bartoli	Dreams & Fables - Gluck Italian Arias: Tremo Fra' Dubbi Miei; Di Questa Cetra In Seno	Won
2002	Best Instrumental Soloist Performance (without Orchestra)	Maurizio Pollini	Schumann: Davidsbündlertänze, Op. 6; Concert Sans Orch.	Nominated
2003	Best Opera Recording	Barbara Frittoli	Mozart: Idomeneo	Nominated
2006	Best Latin Pop Album	Laura Pausini	Escucha	Won
2006	Best Classical Vocal Performance	Cecilia Bartoli	Opera Proibita	Nominated
2007	Best Instrumental Soloist Performance (without Orchestra)	Maurizio Pollini	Chopin: Nocturnes	Won
2008	Best Remixer of the Year	Benny Benassi	"Bring the Noise" (Benny Benassi Sfaction Remix)	Won
2008	Best Classical Album	Riccardo Muti	Cherubini: Missa Solemnis In E	Nominated
2008	Best Choral Performance	Riccardo Muti	Cherubini: Missa Solemnis In E	Nominated
2009	Best Classical Album	Cecilia Bartoli	Maria	Nominated
2009	Best Classical Vocal Performance	Cecilia Bartoli	Maria	Nominated
2011	Best Classical Vocal Performance	Cecilia Bartoli	Sacrificium	Won
2011	Best Classical Album	Cecilia Bartoli	Sacrificium	Nominated
2011	Best Classical Album	Riccardo Muti	Verdi: Requiem	Won
2011	Best Choral Performance	Riccardo Muti	Verdi: Requiem	Won
2014	Album of the Year	Giorgio Moroder	Random Access Memories (Note: Moroder was one of multiple collaborators on the album.)	Won
2014	Grammy Trustees Award	Ennio Morricone		Won
2014	Best Classical Vocal Solo	Cecilia Bartoli	Mission	Nominated
2016	Best Classical Solo Vocal Album	Cecilia Bartoli	St. Petersburg	Nominated
2017	Best Latin Pop Album	Laura Pausini	Similares	Nominated
2017	Best World Music Album	Giovanni Sollima	Sing Me Home	Won
2017	Best Opera Recording	Cecilia Bartoli	Handel: Giulio Cesare	Nominated
2017	Best Score Soundtrack For Visual Media	Ennio Morricone	Quentin Tarantino's The Hateful Eight	Nominated
2017	Best Instrumental Composition	Ennio Morricone	L'Ultima Diligenza Di Red Rock - Versione Integrale	Nominated
2017	Best Traditional Pop Vocal Album	Andrea Bocelli	Cinema	Nominated
2018	Best Opera Recording	Gianandrea Noseda	Bizet: Les pêcheurs de perles	Nominated
2020	Best Traditional Pop Vocal Album	Andrea Bocelli	Sì	Nominated
2020	Best Dance Recording	Meduza	"Piece of Your Heart"	Nominated
2020	Best American Roots Performance	Francesco Turrisi	I'm On My Way	Nominated
2021	Best Classical Solo Vocal Album	Cecilia Bartoli	Farinelli	Nominated
2022	Best American Roots Song	Francesco Turrisi	"Avalon"	Nominated
2022	Best Folk Album	Francesco Turrisi	They're Calling Me Home	Won
2023	Best New Artist	Måneskin		Nominated
