= List of Senegalese Grammy Award winners and nominees =

The following is a list of Grammy Awards winners and nominees from Senegal:

Year	Category	Nominees(s)	Nominated for	Result
1993	Best World Music Album	Youssou N'Dour	Eyes Open	Nominated
1995	Best World Music Album	Youssou N'Dour	The Guide	Nominated
1996	Best World Music Album	Baaba Maal	Firin' in Fouta	Nominated
2001	Best World Music Album	Youssou N'Dour	Joko: The Link	Nominated
2004	Best Contemporary World Music Album	Youssou N'Dour	Nothing's In Vain (Coono du Réér)	Nominated
2004	Best Contemporary World Music Album	Orchestra Baobab	Specialist in All Styles	Nominated
2005	Best Contemporary World Music Album	Youssou N'Dour	Egypt	Won
2009	Best Contemporary World Music Album	Youssou N'Dour	Rokku Mi Rokka	Nominated
