= Steppin' Out (Herb Alpert album) =

Studio album by Herb Alpert
- Released: November 19, 2013
- Genre: Jazz
- Label: Shout! Factory
- Producer: Herb Alpert, Randy "Badazz" Alpert, Jeff Lorber, Lani Hall

Herb Alpert chronology
I Feel You (2011)	Steppin' Out (2013)

Steppin' Out is an album by Herb Alpert, released by the record label Shout! Factory on November 19, 2013. In the United States, the album reached a peak position of number fifteen on Billboard's Jazz Albums chart, and earned Alpert a Grammy Award for Best Pop Instrumental Album at the 56th Annual Grammy Awards on January 26, 2014.

== Track listing ==
1. "Puttin' On the Ritz" (Irving Berlin) - 3:02
2. "Jacky's Place" (Herb Alpert, Bill Cantos, Jeff Lorber) - 4:14
3. "Our Song" (Art Pepper) - 5:03
4. "Green Lemonade" (Alpert, Cantos, Lorber) - 4:04
5. "I Only Have Eyes for You" (Al Dubin, Harry Warren)- 3:29
6. "Good Morning Mr. Sunshine" (Rubén Fuentes) - 4:01
7. "Oblivion" (Astor Piazzolla) - 4:26
8. "What'll I Do?" (Berlin) - 3:31
9. "Côte d'Azur" (Alpert, Cantos, Lorber) - 4:03
10. "La Vie en Rose" (Édith Piaf, Louis Guglielmi) - 2:42
11. "It's All in the Game" - 3:18
12. "Europa" (Carlos Santana, Tom Coster) - 4:44
13. "And the Angels Sing" (Johnny Mercer, Ziggy Elman) - 3:07
14. "Skylark" (Hoagy Carmichael, Mercer) - 4:34
15. "Migration" (Alpert, Cantos, Lorber) - 3:51
16. "The Lonely Bull" (Sol Lake) - 4:39

== Personnel ==
- Herb Alpert – trumpets, vocals
- Lani Hall – vocals
- Coco Triuisonno – bandoneon
- Jeff Lorber – keyboards (2, 4, 9, 15), guitars (2, 4, 9, 15)
- Bill Cantos – keyboards (3, 5, 8, 12, 16), arrangements (6, 7, 11, 13, 14), orchestrations (7, 14)
- Eduardo del Barrio – keyboards (3, 5, 8, 12, 16), orchestrations and arrangements (3, 5, 12, 16)
- Ramón Stagnaro – acoustic guitars
- Paul Jackson Jr. – additional guitars (2, 4, 9, 15)
- Hussain Jiffry – bass
- Mike Shapiro – drums, percussion
- Mari Falcone – orchestrations and arrangements (14)
- Nick Glennie-Smith – conductor

=== Production ===
- Herb Alpert – producer, cover art
- Randy "Badazz" Alpert – producer (1)
- Jeff Lorber – producer (2, 4, 9, 15)
- Lani Hall – co-producer (2, 4, 9, 15), producer (3, 5–8, 10–14, 16)
- Iggy Elizabesky – engineer
- Hussain Jiffry – engineer
- Alan Meyerson – engineer, string recording, mixing (16)
- Mick Guzauski – mixing (1–15)
- Bernie Grundman – mastering at Bernie Grundman Mastering (Hollywood, California)
- Meryl Pollen – design
- Roland Young – design
