= 1977 (Ana Tijoux album) =

Studio album by Ana Tijoux
- Released: March 9, 2010
- Recorded: 2009
- Genres: Hip-hop, jazz
- Length: 55:30
- Label: Nacional Records

Ana Tijoux chronology
Kaos (2007)	1977 (2010)	Elefant Mixtape (2011)

Singles from 1977
- 1. "1977" Released: July 10, 2010; 2. "Partir de cero" Released: 2010; 3. "Crisis de un MC" Released: 2010

1977 is the second studio album by Latin Hip-hop artist Ana Tijoux, released March 9, 2010 on Nacional Records. The album received a Grammy Award nomination for Best Latin Rock/Alternative Album. The single "1977" was featured in AMC's Breaking Bad, Comedy Central's Broad City and the EA Sports video games, FIFA 11 and FIFA 23.

== Background ==
In October 2009, La Oveja Negra in Chile released 1977, her second solo album, with the name being the year Tijoux was born. It is a return to her Hip-Hop roots, a homage to the "golden age of Hip-Hop", and largely auto-biographical, exploring mature themes from her own life, from the death of a close friend to having a creative crises, friendship and bad luck, amongst others. It is simple and straight to the point, this being emphasized by her leaving behind a lot of the singing she had been doing previously in other more pop collaborations, and concentrating on rap, both in Spanish and French. After years of sharing the spotlight with her group, collaborating with other artists, and trying to find her way as a solo artist,

Recorded between May and September 2009, the new album was produced by Ana Tijoux, Hordatoj, Foex y DJ Tee (of the label Potoco Discos),together with Habitación Del Pánico. Guests on the record include the saxophonist Agustín Moya with whom she worked with in Aluzinati, Andrés Celis, Solo Di Medina, Bubaseta, Stailok from the group Movimiento Original, DJ Dacel, Quique Neira from Godwana, Cómo Asesinar A Felipes, and the Detroit-based MC Invincible, whom she met over MySpace and did a virtual collaboration for the song "Sube".

The album and its first single "1977" were an immediate hit in the underground rap circles of Chile, where she was welcomed back after a bit of a stray. The record was amongst the top 10 of 2009 for the blog "World Hip-Hop Market", and it was soon picked up by the US-based Latin Alternative label Nacional Records, who released it in March 2010. She was invited to attend the prestigious South By South West Music Festival in Austin, TX, in March 2010, and from there went on to her first ever North American tour.

The single '1977' gained further attention when it featured in the EA Sports video game, FIFA 11. The same song was again in the spotlight in 2011 when it was used in Shotgun - the fifth episode of season 4 of AMC's Breaking Bad. In 2022, the song was brought back for FIFA 23, as part of the game's Ultimate FIFA Soundtrack (a compilation of 40 songs from past FIFA games).

== Reception ==
=== Critical response ===
Professional ratings
Review scores
Source	Rating
AllMusic	5/5 stars

The album received generally favorable reviews, with critics complimenting Tijoux as "an artist with the promise to cross borders and genres." Critics also complimenting the production for the album, writing "The production suits Ana nicely as well. Combining steady boom-bap drum sequences with organic vinyl scratches and a flare of Latin American influence, the production varies between spicy and soulful, all with an overarching affinity for old-school hip-hop."

Phil Freeman of Allmusic gave the album 5 out of 5, saying "The music behind her is [...] mostly funky and occasionally lurching, these are jazzy beats firmly rooted in the tradition of DJ Premier, DJ Cam, DJ Krush, and other '90s classicists" and "like New York rappers of a prior generation like Jeru the Damaja, she'd rather get listeners thinking than soundtrack their parties."

== Track listing ==
No.	Title	Producer(s)	Length
1.	"Intro (Theme Song)"	Hordatoj	1:17
2.	"Partir de cero (Starting from Zero)"	Hordatoj, Ana Tijoux	3:48
3.	"1977"	Ana Tijoux	3:22
4.	"Sube (Go up)"	Hordatoj, Ana Tijoux	3:33
5.	"Obstáculo (Obstacle)"	DJ Spacio, Ana Tijoux	4:03
6.	"Crisis de un MC (Crisis of an MC)"	Hordatoj, Ana Tijoux	4:31
7.	"Problema de 2 (Problem of 2)"	DJ Tee, Ana Tijoux	3:52
8.	"Mar adentro (Sea inside)"	DJ Dacel, Hordatoj, Ana Tijoux	3:49
9.	"Oulala"	Hordatoj, Ana Tijoux	3:20
10.	"Pie izquierdo (con Bubaseta y Stailok) (Left Foot (with Bubaseta and Stailok))"	Hordatoj, Ana Tijoux	3:58
11.	"Humanidad (Humanity)"	Hordatoj, Ana Tijoux	3:59
12.	"La nueva condena (The new sentence)"	Ana Tijoux	3:29
13.	"Avaricia (Avarice)"	Da Bass, Fire Rebel	5:00
14.	"Crisis de un MC" (CAF Version)	Como Asesinar, Ana Tijoux	4:02

== Charts ==
Chart (2010)	Peak position
US Top Latin Albums (Billboard)	63
US Latin Rhythm Albums (Billboard)	6

== Certifications ==
Region	Certification	Certified units/sales
United States (RIAA)	Gold (Latin)	30,000^{‡}
^{‡} Sales+streaming figures based on certification alone.
