= The String Revolution =

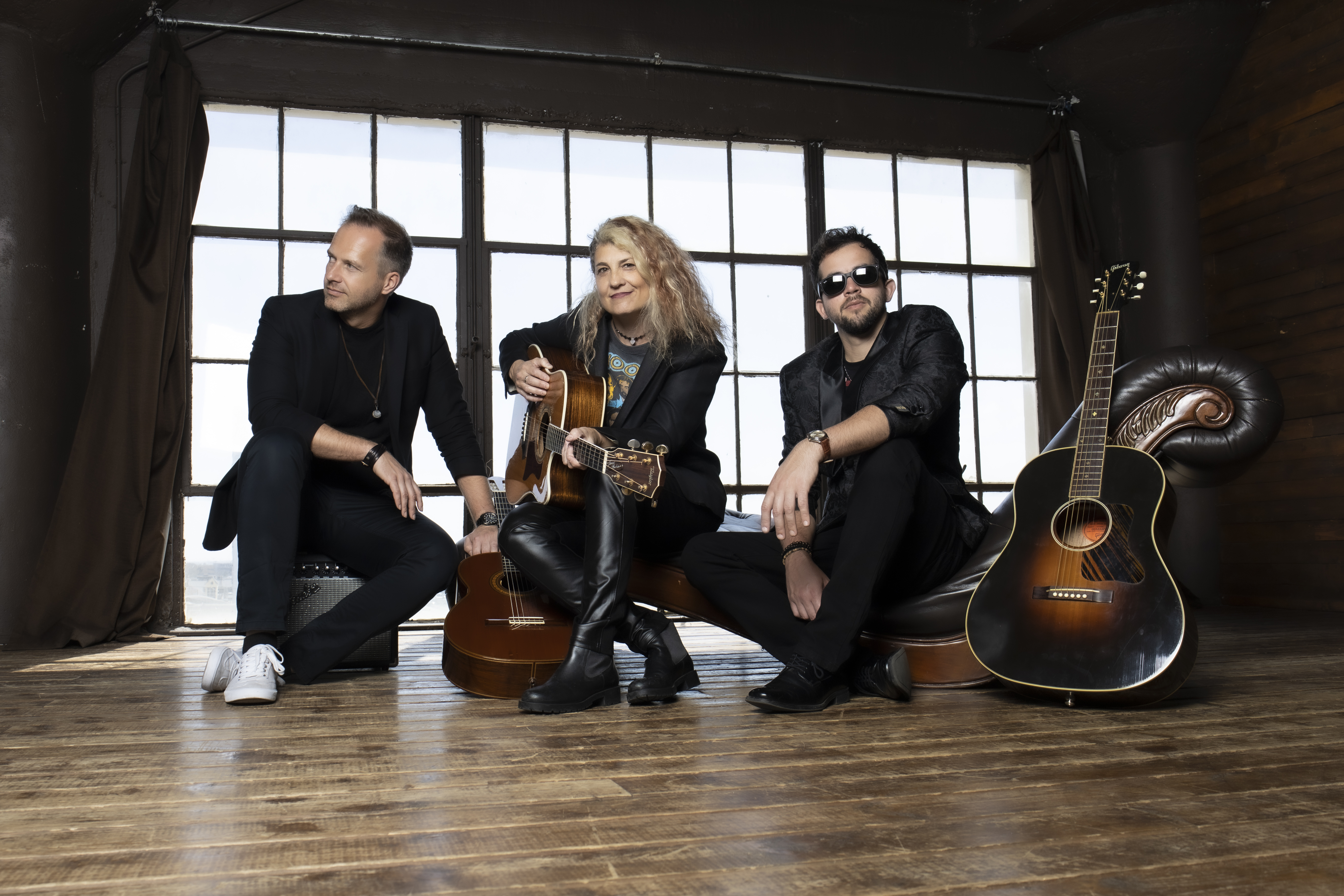
- From left to right: Markus Illko, Janet Robin, Rober Luis

Background information
- Origin: Los Angeles, United States
- Genres: Guitar instrumental, world music, experimental, rock, blues
- Years active: 2015–present
- Members: Markus Illko; Janet Robin; Rober Luis Gomez
- Past members: Daniel Schwarz; Art Zavala Jr.
- Website: thestringrevolution.com

The String Revolution is an international guitar ensemble composed of Markus Illko, Janet Robin and Rober Luis Gomez formed in Los Angeles, California in 2015. The group's debut EP, Stringborn, was released in 2016 and was mixed and mastered by Matt Hyde (Rodrigo y Gabriela). Their follow-up EP, Red Drops, was released in 2019 and was also mixed and mastered by Hyde. Two additional singles "Figure 8" and "Crazy Train" were released in 2020 and 2022, respectively.

== Career ==
Robin was inspired to form The String Revolution in 2015 several years after she performed in Lindsey Buckingham's solo band, which included five guitar players. Robin recruited the three original members of The String Revolution from the Los Angeles music scene. The members of the group perform mostly instrumental acoustic music and have diverse backgrounds as musicians representing different disciplines, including elements of rock, blues, classical, flamenco, bluegrass, alternative, and experimental.

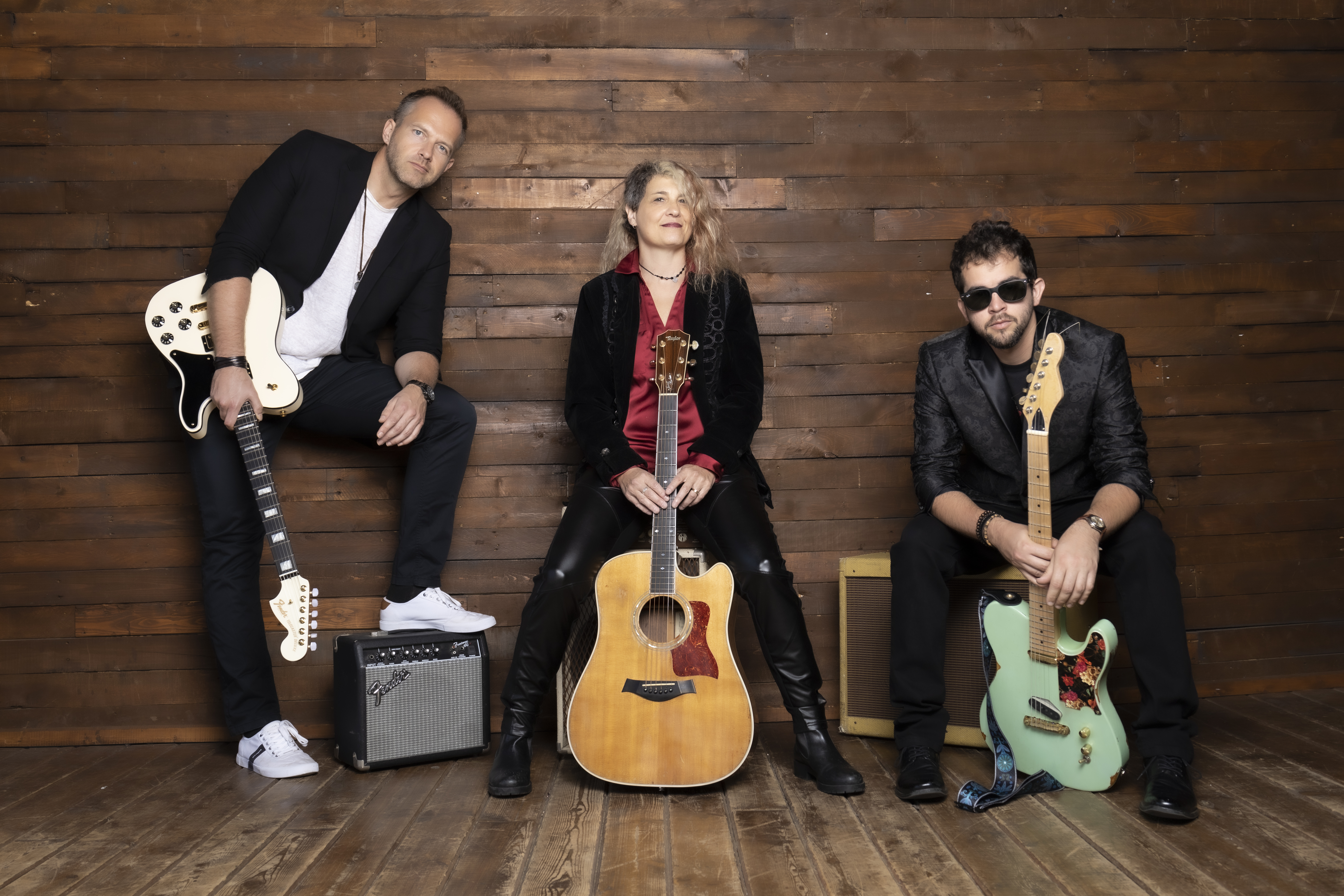
An innovative and dynamic guitar band

The String Revolution's first EP, Stringborn, features an acoustic cover of Michael Jackson's "Billie Jean" that reached the Top 10 on the Spotify LA Instrumental Charts. A follow-up EP, Red Drops, was released in 2019 and features a cover of Sting's "Englishman in New York." Between those releases, The String Revolution also released a cover of Elton John's "Rocket Man." In September 2020, The String Revolution released the single "Figure 8."

The band has had several notable performances, including performing at the Festival of the Arts in Laguna Beach, California in 2017 and the River Spirit Festival in Hastings-on-Hudson, New York in 2019. In December 2019, The String Revolution performed at the Clive Davis Theater at the Grammy Museum in Los Angeles, California as part of the "Great Guitars" American Express Concert Series.

In January 2022, The String Revolution released a new instrumental version of the Ozzy Osbourne, Randy Rhoads, and Bob Daisley song, "Crazy Train" with Billy Idol guitarist Steve Stevens as guest soloist. The group recorded the song in celebration of Rhoads into the Rock and Roll Hall of Fame. Robin was the youngest and only female guitar student taught by Rhoads.

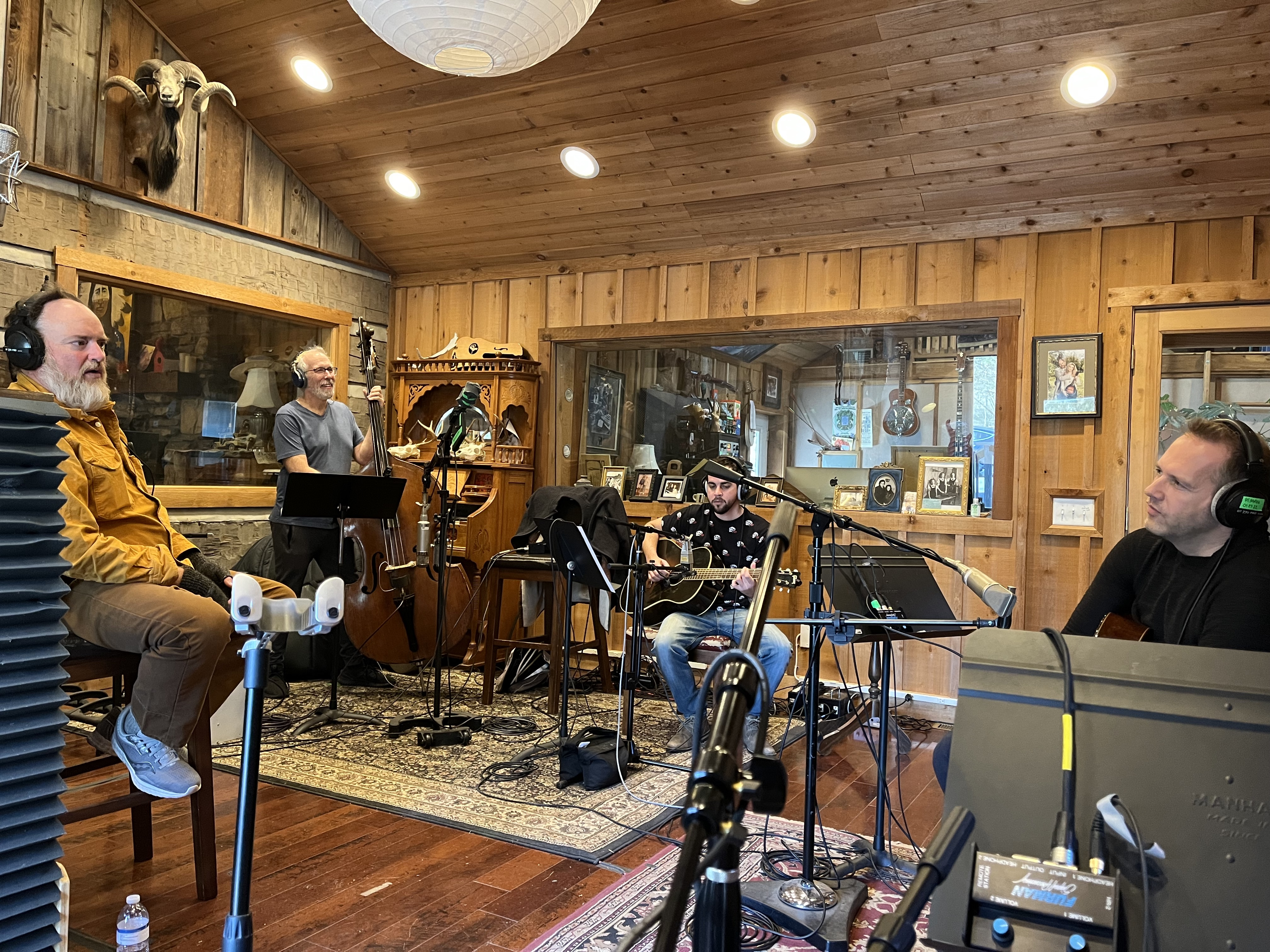
From left to right: John Carter Cash, Byron House, Markus Illko during the recording of "Folsom Prison Blues" in Cash Cabin, Nashville

In 2023, the band got together to arrange “Folsom Prison Blues.” They tapped John Carter Cash (Johnny Cash's son) for production and Tommy Emmanuel to join in as a featured guitarist on the new arrangement of “Folsom Prison Blues.”

== Band members ==
Current members

- Markus Illko – guitar, banjitar, bass, vocals
- Janet Robin – guitar, banjitar
- Rober Luis Gomez - guitar

Former members

- Daniel Schwarz – guitar, slide guitar
- Art Zavala Jr. – guitar, banjitar, bass, vocals

== Discography ==
- 2016: Stringborn, EP (String Revolution Music)
- 2019: "Rocket Man", Single (String Revolution Music)
- 2019: Red Drops, EP (String Revolution Music)
- 2020: "Figure 8", Single (String Revolution Music)
- 2022: "Crazy Train", Single (String Revolution Music)
- 2023: "Folsom Prison Blues", Single (Universal Music)
- 2025: "Bad Zombies", Single (Electronic Arts Inc.)
