= La Bala (album) =

Studio album by Ana Tijoux
- Released: 2011
- Recorded: 2011
- Genre: Latin, Hip hop, Jazz, Funk, Soul
- Length: 45:38
- Label: Oveja Negra, Nacional Records

Ana Tijoux chronology
Elefant Mixtape (2011)	La Bala (2011)	Vengo (2014)

La Bala is the third studio album by Latin hip hop artist Ana Tijoux, released in 2011 by Oveja Negra and in 2012 by Nacional Records.

The album was nominated for the Latin Grammy Award for Best Urban Music Album in 2012, and the Grammy Award for Best Latin Rock, Urban or Alternative Album in 2013.

== Reception ==
Critics have noted the thematic shift in focus from the exploration of personal history and identity in Tijoux's previous album, 1977, towards pointed political critique. Tijoux has stated the album was partly inspired by the global politics of 2011 and 2012, particularly the growth of protests such as Occupy Wall Street, 15M in Spain, and the Chilean Student Movement. Reviewers at NPR have praised the album for being both "musically solid and socially conscious." Some suspected the opening track "La Bala" ('The Bullet"), which describes the shooting of a young man, was based on the death of Chilean student protester Manuel Gutierrez Reinoso. Tijoux has denied this, noting how she wrote the song several months before the incident.

"Shock" was the first single released from the album. It was inspired by and named after Naomi Klein's book, The Shock Doctrine, which discusses how global powers have used violence and "manufactured crises" to maintain power and exploit workers, including how the policies of economists like Milton Friedman affected the Chilean people under the Pinochet regime. The song went on to become an anthem for Chilean student protesters. The music video for "Shock" was directed by Aldo Guerrero and features footage from schools and universities occupied by student protesters.

== Track listing ==
No.	Title	Length
1.	"La Bala"
2.	"Shock"
3.	"Desclasificado"
4.	"Sacar La Voz"
5.	"El Rey Solo"
6.	"Quizás"
7.	"Si Te Preguntan"
8.	"Las Cosas Por Su Nombre"
9.	"Mi Mitad"
10.	"Las Horas"
11.	"Volver"

== Charts ==
Chart (2012)	Peak position
US Top Latin Albums (Billboard)	40
US Latin Rhythm Albums (Billboard)	2
