= Gasimov =

Gasimov, Qasimov or Kasumov (Azerbaijani: Qasımov) is an Azerbaijani male surname, its feminine counterpart is Gasimova, Qasimova or Kasumova. It may refer to

- Alim Qasimov (born 1957), Azerbaijani singer and musician
- Eldar Gasimov (born 1989), Azerbaijani singer also known as Ell, winner of the Eurovision Song Contest 2011 as part of duo Ell & Nikki
- Elmar Gasimov (born 1988), Azerbaijani judoka
- Faig Gasimov (1974–2020), Azerbaijani lieutenant colonel
- Farghana Qasimova (born 1979), Azerbaijani singer
- Fidan Gasimova (born 1947), Azerbaijani operatic soprano
- Ilaha Gasimova (born 1992), Azerbaijani karateka
- Ilhama Gasimova (born 1976), Azerbaijani pop singer
- Jabbar Gasimov (1935–2002), Azerbaijani poster artist
- Khuraman Gasimova, Azerbaijani opera singer and actress
- Kifayat Gasimova (born 1983), Azerbaijani judoka
- Mir Bashir Gasimov (1879–1949), Azerbaijani statesman and revolutionary
- Natavan Gasimova (born 1985), Azerbaijani volleyball player
- Ramil Gasimov (born 1980), Azerbaijani judoka
- Rena Gasimova (born 1961), Azerbaijani computer scientist
- Ruslan Gasimov (born 1979), Azerbaijani-Russian judoka
- Tofig Gasimov (1938–2020), Azerbaijani politician and diplomat
- Vali Gasimov (born 1968), Azerbaijani football player
- Gasimov brothers, Haji, Ali and Imran

== See also ==
- Gashimov
- Kasimov (surname)
