= Tamara Butaeva =

Tamara Butayeva
- Тама́ра Бута́ева
- Born: June 25, 1912; Baku, Russian Empire
- Died: 1998; Vladikavkaz, Russia
- Education: Azerbaijan Polytechnic Institute
- Occupation: Civil architect
- Awards: Order of the Badge of Honour; Honored Architect of the RSFSR
- Buildings: Hotel "Caucasus", Vladikavkaz Television Center, Vladikavkaz Opera and Ballet Theater, Spartak Stadium
- Projects: General plan of Beslan, development project of the Pravoberezhny raion of Magnitogorsk

Tamara Mikhailovna Butaeva (Russian: Тамара Михайловна Бутаева; 1912–1998) was a Soviet architect and educator. She was honored as a Honored Architect of the RSFSR in 1974.

== Biography ==
Tamara Butaeva studied at the Azerbaijan Polytechnic Institute in Baku, specializing in architectural engineering, and graduated in 1936. After graduating, Butaeva moved to Ordzhonikidze and worked as an architect at the 1st Architecture and Planning Workshop of the People's Commissariat for Municipal Economy of the North Ossetian ASSR. In 1943, she transferred to the Sewosproject Construction Design Office for North Ossetia.

In 1946, Tamara Mikhailovna Butaeva became a staff member of the Moscow Design Institute "Gipromes", focusing on the civil construction sector for metallurgical plants. 1948, Tamara Mikhailovna Butaeva returned to North Ossetia and worked at the Architecture Planning Workshop of the Architecture Administration of the North Ossetian ASSR. In 1950, she resumed her role as an architect at the Sewosproject Construction Design Office.

In 1964, Tamara Mikhailovna Butaeva became the chief engineer at the North Ossetian Construction Design Institute Sewosgraschdanprojekt. In 1971, she was appointed Chief Architect at the same institute, a position she held until 1994. From 1994 to 1998, Tamara Mikhailovna Butaeva led an architect group and was a member of the Union of Architects of Russia. She died in 1998 in Vladikavkaz.

In 2012, a commemorative plaque was installed at the house where Tamara Mikhailovna Butaeva lived. The plaque was created by sculptor Ruslan Dzhanaev.

== Honors ==
- Order of the Badge of Honour (1966)
- Honored Architect of the RSFSR (1974)

== Projects ==
- In Vladikavkaz:
  - Hotel Kawkas (1949; an architectural landmark)
  - North Ossetian State Opera and Ballet Theater (1956–1958; since 2017, a branch of the Mariinsky Theatre in Saint Petersburg)
  - Telecenter with Television Tower (1959)
  - Republican Spartak Stadium (1960–1962)
  - Main Building of the State Mining and Agricultural University
  - General Plan for Beslan
- At other location:
  - Lermontov Theater, Grozny
  - Sanatorium complex with 300 beds, Kislovodsk
  - General Plan for the Pravoberezhny raion of Magnitogorsk
- Exemplar projects:
  - Holiday Village with 500 Beds
  - Sanatorium Complex with spa hotels and 1000 beds
  - Shopping Center with 1000 m^{2} of Space
  - Palace of Culture with a hall for 600 Seats
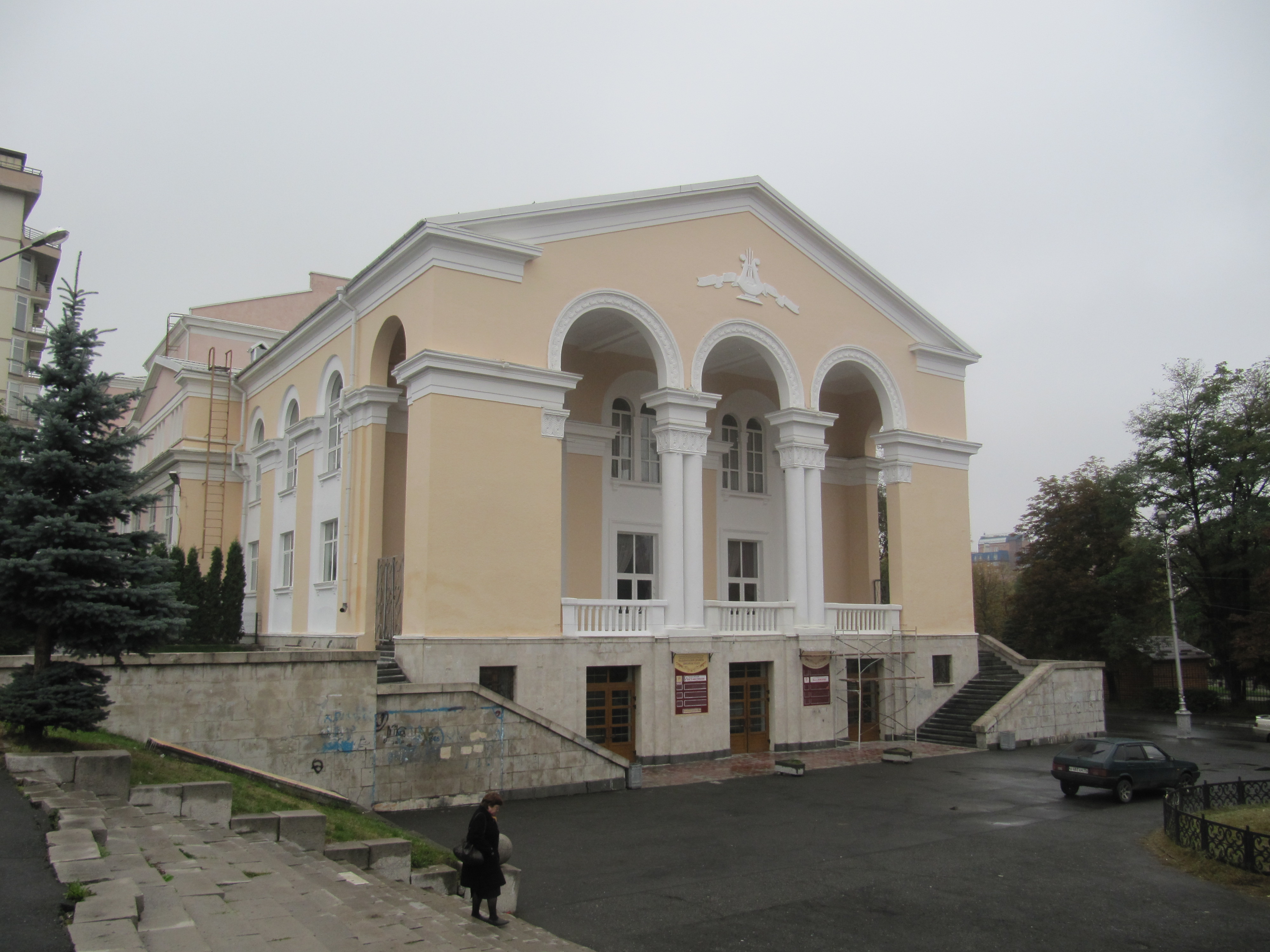
North Ossetian State Opera and Ballet Theater

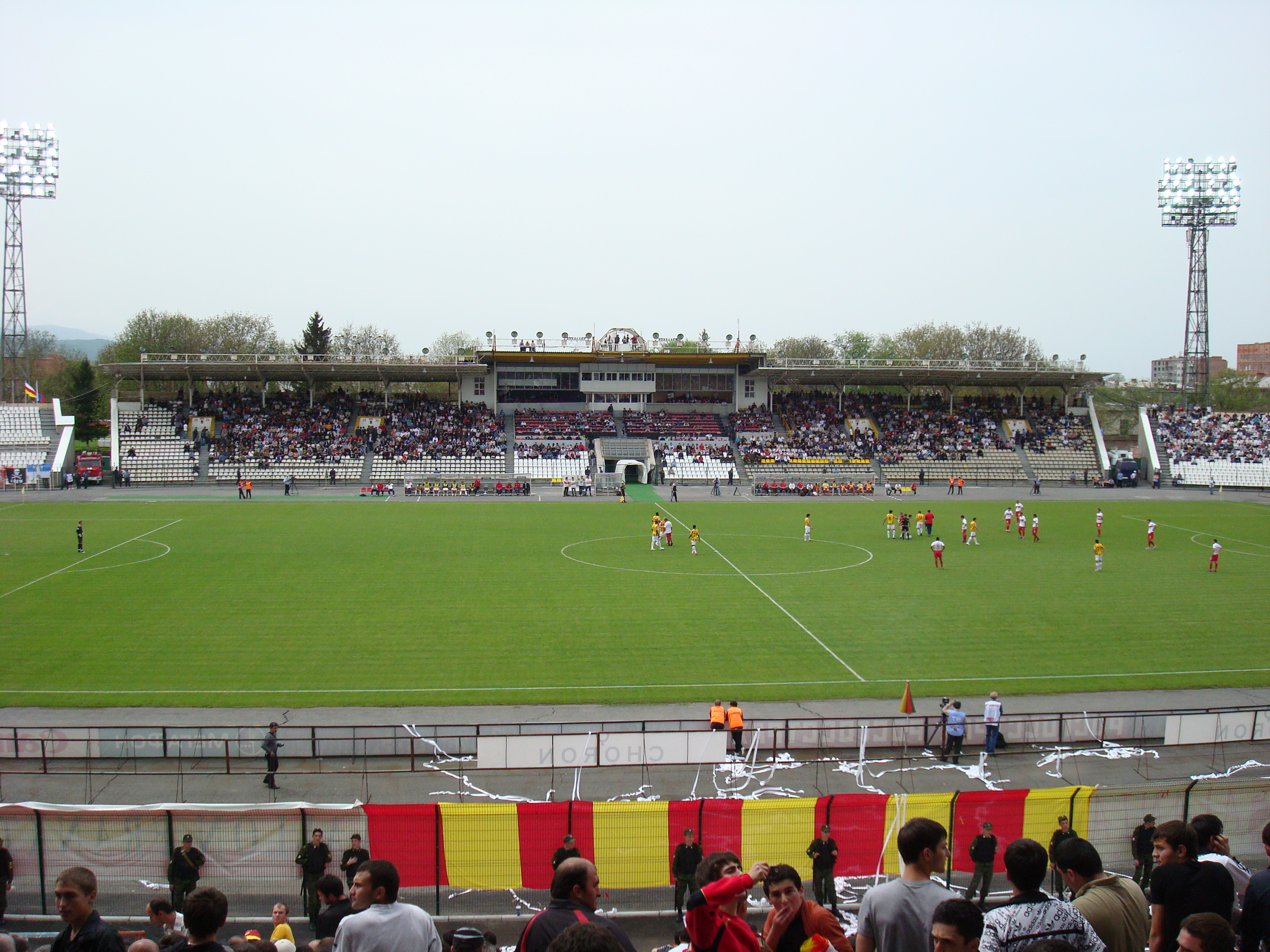
Republican Spartak Stadium

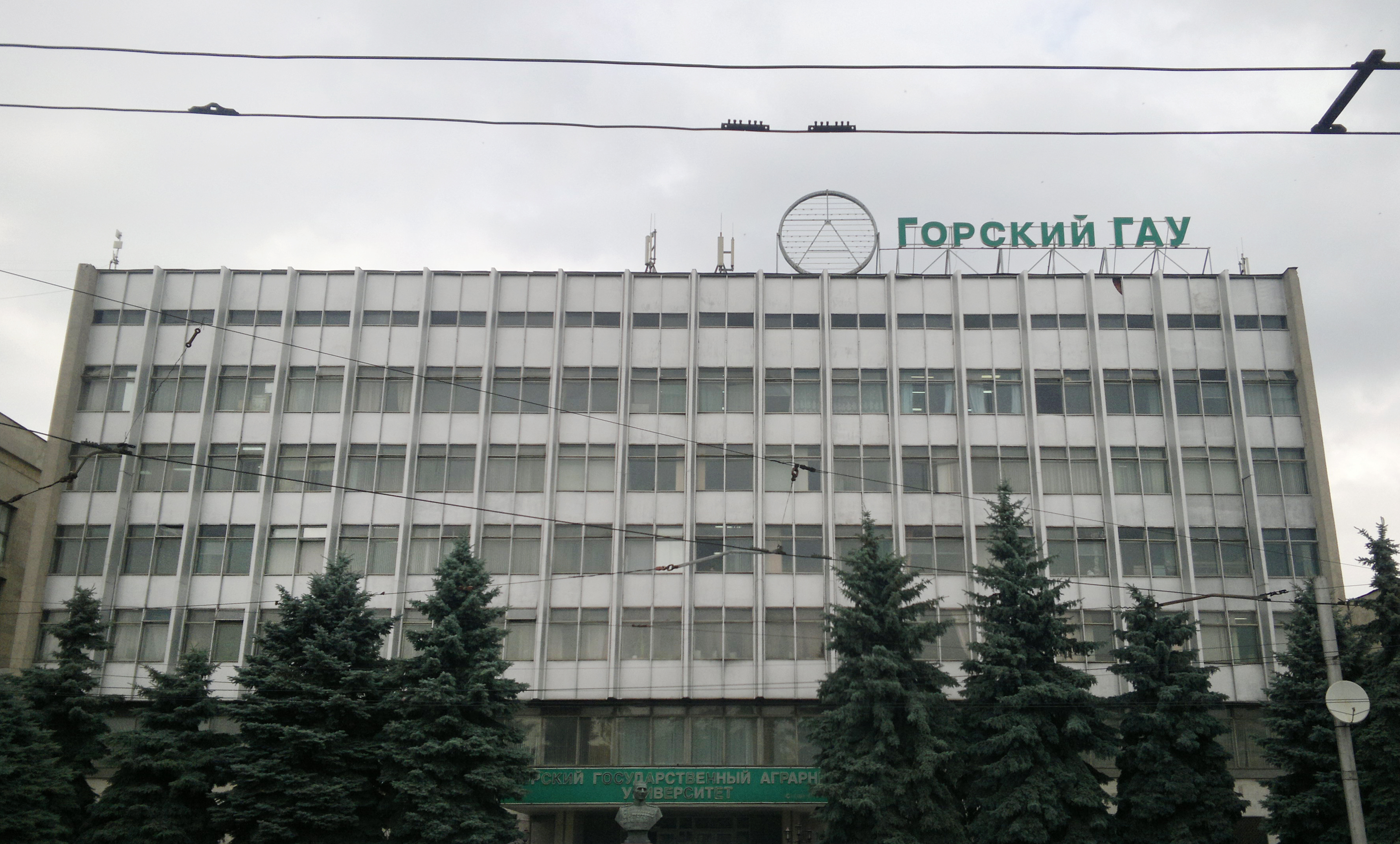
Building of the State Mining and Agricultural University

== Literature ==
- Кадыков А. Н., Цаллагов С. Ф. (2020). Владикавказ. Память в камне и металле. Владикавказ: Ир. pp. 24–25.
