= Javanshir Huseynov =

Javanshir Huseynov Cavanşir Hüseynov

Chairman of the State Construction Works Committee of the Azerbaijan SSR
- In office November 15, 1978 – December 2, 1985
- Preceded by: Yagub Ismayilov

First Deputy Minister of Construction Materials Industry of the Azerbaijan SSR
- In office 1975–1978
- Minister: Farid Musabeyov; Nariman Isayev

Personal details
- Born: January 23, 1934
- Died: December 2, 1985 (aged 51)
- Resting place: Alley of Honor
- Party: CPSU
- Education: Azerbaijan Polytechnic Institute
- Awards: Order of the Red Banner of Labour Order of the Badge of Honour Honored Engineer of the Azerbaijan SSR

Javanshir Tamraz oghlu Huseynov (Azerbaijani: Cavanşir Təmraz oğlu Hüseynov, January 23, 1934 — December 2, 1985) was an Azerbaijani builder-engineer and statesman, Chairman of the State Construction Works Committee of the Azerbaijan SSR (1978–1985), First Deputy Minister of the Construction Materials Industry of the Azerbaijan SSR (1975–1978), Deputy of the 10th and 11th convocations of the Supreme Soviet of the Azerbaijan SSR.

== Biography ==
Javanshir Tamraz oghlu Huseynov was born on January 23, 1934. After graduating from the Azerbaijan Polytechnic Institute in 1957, he worked as a builder-technician and construction foreman in the construction departments of the Baku General Construction Department. From 1958 to 1963, he was a teacher and graduate student of the Azerbaijan Polytechnic Institute.

In 1963–1968, he worked as a chief project engineer, deputy head of the department, acting head of the construction organization and technology trust of the Ministry of Construction of the Azerbaijan SSR, and head of the construction assistance office of the General Inter-Kolkhoz Construction Department. From 1968, he worked as the deputy manager of the "Sanayetikintimekhanikleshdirme" trust, the chief engineer of the trust, and in 1971-1975 he was the manager of the trust number 4 of the Ministry of Industrial Construction of the Azerbaijan SSR. və 1971–1975-ci illərdə Azərbaycan SSR Sənaye Tikintisi Nazirliyi 4 nömrəli trestinin müdiri olmuşdur.

From 1975 to 1978, Javanshir Huseynov worked as the First Deputy Minister of Construction Materials Industry of the Azerbaijan SSR. In 1978, he was appointed chairman of the Azerbaijan SSR State Construction Works Committee.

Javanshir Huseynov has been a member of the Communist Party of the Soviet Union since 1968 and was elected deputy of the 10th and 11th convocations of the Supreme Soviet of the Azerbaijan SSR. He was awarded the "Red Banner of Labour" and "Badge of Honour" orders, and was awarded the honorary title of "Honored Engineer of the Azerbaijan SSR".

Javanshir Huseynov died on December 2, 1985, after a long illness. He was buried in Alley of Honor.
