= Telman Kazimov =

Soviet Azerbaijani engineer and statesman

Telman Kazimov Telman Kazımov

Minister of Installation and Special Construction of the Azerbaijan SSR
- In office April 12, 1982 – October 24, 1988
- Preceded by: himself (office became a ministry)
- Succeeded by: office abolished

Chief of the Main Installation and Special Construction Department of the Azerbaijan SSR
- In office June 16, 1976 – April 12, 1982
- Preceded by: Nariman Isayev
- Succeeded by: himself (office became a ministry)

Personal details
- Born: February 9, 1937 Lankaran, Lankaran District, Azerbaijan SSR, USSR
- Died: October 31, 2016 (aged 79)
- Education: Azerbaijan Polytechnic Institute
- Awards: Order of the Red Banner of Labour Honored Builder of the Azerbaijan SSR

Telman Mammad oghlu Kazimov (Azerbaijani: Telman Məmməd oğlu Kazımov, February 9, 1937 — October 31, 2016) was an Azerbaijani civil engineer and statesman, Minister of Installation and Special Construction of the Azerbaijan SSR (1982-1988), Chief of the Main Installation and Special Construction Department of the Azerbaijan SSR (1976-1982), Honored Builder of the Azerbaijan SSR.

== Biography ==
Telman Kazimov was born on February 9, 1937, in the city of Lankaran. In 1955, he graduated from secondary school No. 4, and in 1955–1960, he studied at the construction faculty of the Azerbaijan Polytechnic Institute, majoring in "Heat and Gas Supply and Ventilation". He was an assistant of the department at the institute.

In 1962–1966, Telman Kazimov, who started his career as a foreman in the Baku Installation Department of the "Gavsantekhqurashtirma" trust in Rostov, Ministry of Installation and Special Construction of the USSR, was the head of the production department at the Baku Installation Department, and the chief of the Absheron Mechanized Mobile Group. In 1966–1972, he worked as the head of the Baku "Santechqurashdirma" Department.

Telman Kazimov was the Deputy Chief of the Department of Installation and Special Construction Affairs of the Council of Ministers of the Azerbaijan SSR in 1972–1976, and the Chief of the department in 1976–1982. In 1982, the Ministry of Installation and Special Construction of the Azerbaijan SSR was established on the basis of this department and he was appointed Minister. After the abolition of the ministry in 1988, Telman Kazimov became the head of the USSR Installation and "Azerqurashdirmakhususitikinti" territorial construction and installation association and the head of the "Azerqurashdirmakhususitikinti" production and construction association. Since 1991, he has been the chairman of "AzQUR" Open Joint Stock Company.

Telman Kazimov had been a member of the Communist Party of the Soviet Union since 1963 and was elected a member of the Audit Commission of the Communist Party of Azerbaijan. He was a deputy of the 9th and 10th convocations of the Supreme Soviet of the Azerbaijan SSR. He was awarded the "Red Banner of Labor" and "Friendship of Peoples" orders and the "For Valiant Labor" medal, and was awarded the honorary title of "Honored Builder of the Azerbaijan SSR". He had been a corresponding member of the International Academy of Engineers since 1997.

Telman Kazimov died in 2016.
