= Hashimov =

Hashimov is a surname. Notable people with the surname include:

- Hikmat Hashimov (born 1979), Uzbek footballer
- Polad Hashimov (1975–2020), Azerbaijani general and military hero
- Rafig Hashimov (born 1966), Azerbaijani journalist
- Zaur Hashimov (born 1981), Azerbaijani footballer

== See also ==
- Gashimov
- Hasanov
