= Oyanish =

Studio album by Alim Qasimov and Coldünya
- Released: 10 December 2003
- Genre: Mugham, World Music, Rock
- Label: Network

Oyanish is a studio album by Alim Qasimov and Coldünya. The album contains five compositions based on mugham and Azerbaijani rock.

== Track listing ==
No.	Title	Writer(s)	Length
1.	"Mehriban Olaq"	Traditional	4:48
2.	"Daghlarin Bashi"	Traditional	5:28
3.	"Shikayyet"		1:23
4.	"Yarim"		2:50
5.	"Oyanish"		5:52

== See also ==
- Mugham
- Meykhana
