= Kasimov (surname) =

Kasimov (Russian: Касимов; Uzbek: Касымов; Ukrainian: Касімов; Azerbaijani: Qasımov) is a Slavic surname. The feminine form of the name is Kasimova (Russian: Касимова). Notable people with the surname include:

== Masculine form ==
- Artyom Kasimov (born 2003), Russian football player
- Dmytro Kasimov (born 1999), Ukrainian football player
- Hindo Kasimov (1934–1986), Bulgarian stage and film actor
- Ikhtiyar Kasimov (1970–1992), Azerbaijani soldier, "National Hero of Azerbaijan"
- Mirjalol Kasimov (footballer, born 1995), Uzbek football player
- Oybek Kasimov (born 1980), Secretary General of the National Olympic Committee of the Republic of Uzbekistan
- Tulkun Kasimov (1945–2025), Soviet-Uzbek military officer

== Feminine form ==
- Irina Kasimova (born 1971), Russian weightlifter
- Nazokat Kasimova (born 1969), Uzbek political scientist

== See also ==
- Aygun Kazimova (born 1971), Azerbaijani singer, songwriter, pop musician, and actress
- Juma Namangani, nickname Jumma Kasimov (1969–2001), Uzbek Islamist militant
- Mirjalol Qosimov, also Mirdjalal Kasimov (born 1970), Uzbek footballer player and manager
- Gasimov, people with this Azerbaijani surname
