= Azerbaijan Technical University =

Public university in Baku, Azerbaijan

- Azərbaycan Texniki Universiteti
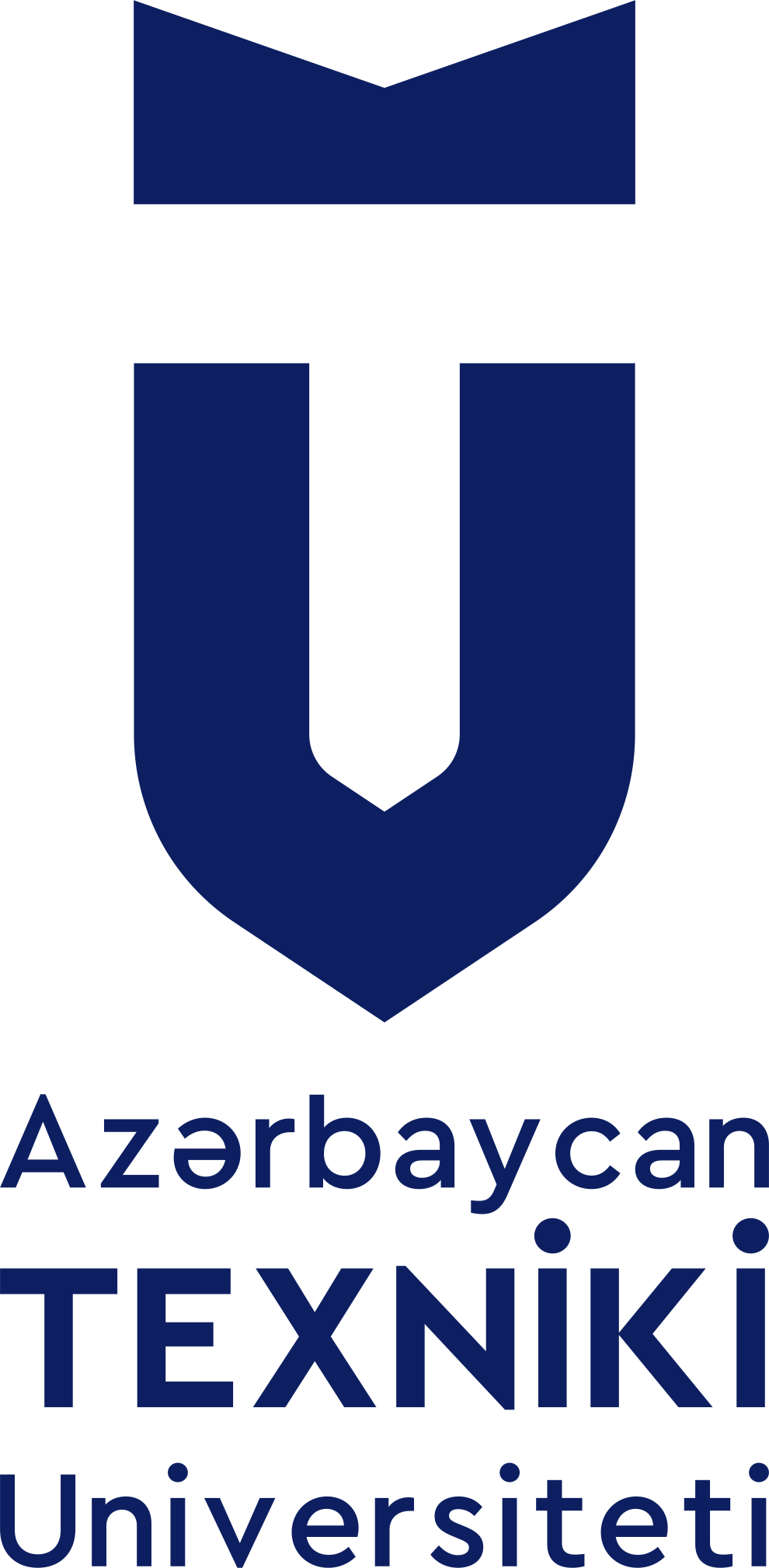
- Logo of AZTU
- Type: Public
- Established: 1950
- Rector: Vilayet Valiyev
- Academic staff: 884
- Administrative staff: 10.000
- Students: 7565
- Location: 25 Hussein Javid prospekti, Baku 370073, Azerbaijan, Baku, Azerbaijan; 40°22′13″N 49°48′55″E
- Campus: Urban
- Transportation: Line 2 Elmlər Akademiyası metro station
- Website: www.aztu.edu.az

Azerbaijan Technical University (AzTU; Azerbaijani: Azərbaycan Texniki Universiteti) is a public university, specialized in engineering, located in Baku, Azerbaijan. The University has 9 schools and 54 departments, 884 faculty members and approximately, 10.000 students.

== History ==
November 14, 1920, the Soviet government decided that the previous technical school "Baku Polytechnicum" would be closed and replaced by the Baku Polytechnic Institute. The new school focused on training engineers in such sectors as agriculture, civil engineering, electromechanics, economics, and oil. In 1923, the school changed its name to the Azerbaijan Polytechnic Institute. In March 1929 the Communist Party of Azerbaijan decided that the school would be divided into three independent schools covering agriculture, economy, and oil.

However, the growing demands of engineers in other areas outside of oil led to the expansion of the school curriculum, and the school again changed its name in 1934, this time to the Azerbaijan Industrial Institute (AZPI), since it was combined with civil engineering. The Second World War taxed the Soviet Union, and schools like AzPI tried to remain open.

In 1950, the government established a separate Azerbaijan Polytechnic Institute (AzPI) and transferred non-petrochemical curricula to a new school so that Az. I.I. can focus on the oil industry. (AzPI continued to eventually become the Azerbaijan State Oil Academy.) In 1970, the branch of AzPI was established in Ganja.

In 1993, AzPI changed its status and became the Azerbaijan Technical University.

== Alumni ==
Head of the Administration of the President

- Samir Nuriyev (Current)

First Deputy Prime Minister of the Republic of Azerbaijan

- Yagub Eyyubov (Current)

Chairman of the Central Bank of the Republic of Azerbaijan

- Taleh Kazimov (Current)

Ministers

- Şahin Mirzəyev Current Minister Minister of Emergency Situations of the Nakhchivan Autonomous Republic
- Siruz Abasbeyli Former Minister of Communications of the Azerbaijan Republic (1992–1997); President of Azerbaijan branch of International Telecommunication Academy
- Marat Allahverdiyev Former Chairman of the Supreme Control Inspection under the President of the Republic of Azerbaijan (1990-1995)
- Saleh Hacıyev –Former Minister of Melioration and Water Management of Azerbaijan (1988–1993)
- Ahmad Mustafayev Former Minister of Light Industry, Azerbaijan SSR (1989–1991)
- Mirismail Aliyev Former Chairman (1990–1991).
- Fuad Rustamov Former Minister of Automobile Transport, Azerbaijan SSR (1987–1990)
- Aydin Mammadov – Former Director General, “Azerbaijan Foreign Trade” Union, Ministry of Foreign Economic Relations, Azerbaijan (1988–1990)
- Söhrab İbrahimov Former Minister of Light Industry of Azerbaijan SSR (1982–1989)
- Telman Kazimov Former Minister of Installation and Special Construction Works of the Azerbaijan SSR (1982–1988)
- Zurab Muradaliyev Former Minister of Public Services of Azerbaijan SSR (1968–1974)
- Suleyman Vazirov Former Minister of the Oil Industry of the Azerbaijan SSR; Chairman of the National Economy Council of the Azerbaijan SSR

Deputy Ministers

- Ismat Aliyev Current Deputy Minister of Internal Affairs
- Abid Sharifov Former Deputy Prime Minister (1995–2018)
- Alaskar Sadiqov First Deputy Prime Minister of the Nakhchivan Autonomous Republic (1991–2001)
- Rasim Quliyev Former Deputy Minister of Municipal Economy of Azerbaijan SSR (1992); President of Absheron Regional Water Society
- Rafiq Khalefov Former Minister of the Exploitation and Construction of Automobile Roads, Azerbaijan SSR (1979–1989); Deputy Chairman of the Cabinet of Ministers of Azerbaijan (1997–1998)

Parliamentarians

- Zahid Oruj Current Parliamentarian
- Anar Məmmədov Current Parliamentarian
- Mikhail Zabelin Current Parliamentarian
- Vahid Ahmadov Current Parliamentarian
- Novruzali Aslanov Current Parliamentarian
- Huseynbala Miralamov Former Parliamentarian (2005-2020)
- Maqsud İbrahimbəyov People’s Writer of Azerbaijan; President of the Azerbaijan PEN Club; Member of the Milli Majlis of the Republic of Azerbaijan; Former Chairman of the Azerbaijan Peace Committee (1960-2016)
- Agakerim Sharifov Former Parliamentarian (2000-2005)
- Ali Alirzayev Former Parliamentarian (1997-2005)
- Umar Əfəndiyev Former Deputy of the National Assembly of Azerbaijan (I convocation, 1996–2000)
- Farhad Karibov Former Deputy of the National Assembly of Azerbaijan (III & IV convocations)

Ambassadors of the Republic of Azerbaijan

- Hasan Hasanov Former Ambassador Extraordinary and Plenipotentiary of the Republic of Azerbaijan to the Republic of Poland (2010-2021)
- Eldar Hasanov — Former Ambassador Extraordinary and Plenipotentiary of the Republic of Azerbaijan to Bosnia and Herzegovina(1995–2000)

Heads of District and City Executive Authorities of Azerbaijan

- Vüqar Novruzov Current Head of Goygol District Executive Authority (2025–present); Head of Naftalan City Executive Authority (2019–2025)
- Siraqeddin Cabbarov Current Head of Sabirabad District Executive Authority (2019–present)
- Asif Huseynov Current Head of Shabran District Executive Authority (2019–present)
- Sevindik Hətəmov — Former Head of Salyan District Executive Authority (2016–2024)
- Elbrus Təhməzov Former Head of Lachin District Executive Authority (2005–2007)
- Hasanali Qadimov Former Head of Executive Authority of Agstafa District (1995–2000)
- Faig Bakhshaliyev Former Head of Agdash District Executive Authorities (1993-1996)
- Tofiq Hüseynli Former head of the Shamkir District Executive Power (1992),

Senior Advisor at the Accounting Chamber of the Republic of Azerbaijan

- Qurban Namazov (Current Senior Advisor)

Rectors

- Havar Mammadov (Former Rector)
- Agajan Abiyev (Former Rector)

Founders

- Araz Agalarov Current President and Owner of the Crocus Group
- Nəbiyyev Akif Musa oğlu Current Founder and CEO of ITM Company; major projects in oil, road and industrial construction
- Azər Kərimov Current Chair of the Czech–Azerbaijan Cultural Relations Center
- Zeynal Karimzada — Current Founder and CEO of Epoint Inc.; Head of Global Innovations LLC and DataPay CJSC
- Toghrul Pashayev Current CEO of Auto Sector at SR Group Co (2024–present); General Manager at Azerbaijan Autohouse LLC (2020–2024)

First Secretaries of the Communist Party (Azerbaijan SSR)

- Firudun Həsənov Former Head of Ganja City Executive Authority(1991–1992)
- Kamran Baghirov Former First Secretary of the Azerbaijan Communist Party Central Committee (1982–1988); First Secretary of Sumqayit City Party Committee
- Qalasi Jafarov — Former First Secretary of the Azerbaijan Communist Party, Zardab District Committee (1980–1983)
- Tafsir Guliyev Former First Secretary of the Azerbaijan Communist Party, Devechi District (1975–1982)

Others

- Shaitdin Aliyev – Current Member Central Election Commission of the Republic of Azerbaijan
- Bəylər Eyyubov Current Head of the Secretariat of the President of the Republic of Azerbaijan
- Rasim Alguliyev Current Vice-President of the Azerbaijan National Academy of Sciences (2019–present)
- Abdul Qahramanzade — Current National ICT Expert; ITU Expert; Leading Researcher, Institute of Cybernetics, Azerbaijan National Academy of Sciences
- Vaqif Maharramov Current Head of the Radiotechnics Department, Azerbaijan Technical University
- Hamlet Aslanov Current Professor; Leading Melioration Scientist; Expert in Soil Reclamation, Irrigation Technologies, and Agroecology
- Orxan Afandiyev Current Professor; Head of “Avtomatika və Aviasiya Cihazları” / “Gəmi Avtovatikası” Departments; International Scientific Contribution in Aviation and Automation
- Vidadi Musayev Current Head of Computer Systems and Networks Department, Azerbaijan Technical University
- Rena Gasimova Current Head Researcher, Scientific Research Coordination Department, Presidium of the Azerbaijan National Academy of Sciences; Senior Researcher, Institute of Information Technology
- Rafiq Huseynov Current Professor, “Metallurgy & Materials Technology” Department, Azerbaijan Technical University; Senior Scientist
- Subhan Namazov Current Vice-Rector for Science & Innovation; Professor at Azerbaijan Technical University; Led international research projects and cooperation
- Fuad Dashdamirov Current Director, Logistics and Transportation Institute, Azerbaijan Technical University
- Akif Cahangirov Current Director, Baku Technical College (under Azerbaijan Technical University)
- Nurmammad Mammadov Current Head of “Building Systems and Structures” Department; Professor; Energy efficiency and ecology expert; Editor-in-Chief of scientific journal
- Nuğay Əliyev Current Chairman of the “Education” Society of the Republic of Azerbaijan
- Afgan Mammadov Current Chief Operating Officer & Deputy CEO, Absheron Logistics Center
- Əlövsət Quliyev Current Acting Director; Chief of the Ecology and Land Reclamation Department; Head of the Melioration Department
- Shamil Aliyev Current Deputy Director, DOST Agency, No. 2 Baku DOST Center
- Fazil Ismayilov Current Director, ATEF Transformer Plant, ATEF Group of Companies
- Sabuhi Zarbaliyev Current Director, Sales Department, Texnovizion
- Ozal Ibrahimli Current Head of Media & Public Relations, Azad Azerbaijan TV & Radio Company (2021–present)
- Elşad Quliyev Martyr Lieutenant Colonel, “Qartal” Special Forces Unit, Ministry of National Security of Azerbaijan; National Hero of Azerbaijan
- Akif Chovdarov Former Major General; Head of the Energy and Transport Security Department, Ministry of National Security of Azerbaijan
- Javid Safarov Former Researcher, Department of Technical Thermodynamics, University of Rostock, Germany
- Tagi Ahmadov Former Chair of the Yeni Azerbaijan Party, Yasamal District (2015–2022)
- İlham Əliyev— Former Chairman Union of Architects of Azerbaijan (1992–2002); Leading Architect; Academician of the International Academy of Architecture
- Asgar Isayev Former Professor; Head of “Construction Mechanics” Department, Azerbaijan University of Architecture and Construction; Vice-Rector for Science and Technology (1993–2000)
- Oqtay Nusratov Former Head of Laboratory; Deputy Director for Scientific Work, Institute of Control Systems of the Azerbaijan National Academy of Sciences
- Abbas Alasgarov Former Director of the Baku State Design Institute
- Mikayil Abbasov Former Technical Director, Radio Television Broadcasting and Satellite Communication Production Union (Teleradio İB)
- Həsən Şirinov Former Deputy Head of the Baku City Main Police Department; Police Major General
- Igor Khankishiyev Former Head of Baku Metro; Oversaw Metro Development and Operations (1979–1987)
- Sadıq Sadıqov Former President of Neftchi Baku PFK (2010–2015); Sports Executive; Member of the National Olympic Committee of Azerbaijan
- Javanshir Huseynov Former Chairman of the State Construction Works Committee of Azerbaijan SSR — Significant role in Soviet-era public construction and governance (1978-1985)

== Faculties ==
Business Administration

Economics

Management

Finance

Computer Science

Radio Engineering and Telecommunications Engineering

Information Technology

AzTU International Business School

University rankings

Global – Overall
- QS World: 851-900 (2026)

Dean's Office for International Students

Automation and Computer Technology

=== Electrical Engineering and Power Engineering ===
It was founded in 1964. The faculty includes 4 departments: Thermal and cold technology, Power supply and insulation, Electrical and electrotechnical equipment, Theoretical bases of electrical engineering. Students are attracted to scientific research conducted at the departments.

=== Transport ===
Previously called mechanical. Its modern name was given to the faculty only in 2001.

=== Technological Machines ===
It was founded in 1986 on the basis of the machine-building faculty. 5 departments are part of the faculty: Machine parts and lifting and transporting machines, Metrology and standardization, Theory of mechanisms and machines, Technological complexes and special equipment, Engineering graphics.

=== Radio engineering and communication ===
During the foundation, in 1960, the faculty was called Electrotechnical. Later, the division was carried out, and two faculties were formed: Electro-technical and Radiotechnical.

=== Metallurgy ===
It was founded in February 1964. The faculty includes 4 departments.

=== Machine-building ===
It was founded in 1982. The faculty includes 5 departments: Technology of mechanization, machine parts, Theory of machines and mechanisms, Technological complexes and special equipment, Physics.

=== AzTU International Business School ===
The business school of Azerbaijan Technical University was established in 2021 with the special focus to train the experts in industry and management. Since the establishment, about 1000+ national and international students are studying the MBA and Master in Business Management programs. With the support of several international faculty members, the MBA programs are being taught in English, Russian and Azerbaijani languages

=== Dean's Office for International Students ===
The purpose of training at the faculty is to train personnel for foreign countries. It was founded in 1978.

=== Automation and Computer Technology ===
It was founded in 1960. There are 6 departments at the faculty: Automation of Computational Technologies and Production Processes, Automation and Telemechanics, Industrial Electronics, General and Theoretical Radio Engineering, Higher Mathematics, Physics.

== See also ==
- Baku Polytechnicum
