= Kamancheh =

Iranian bowed string instrument

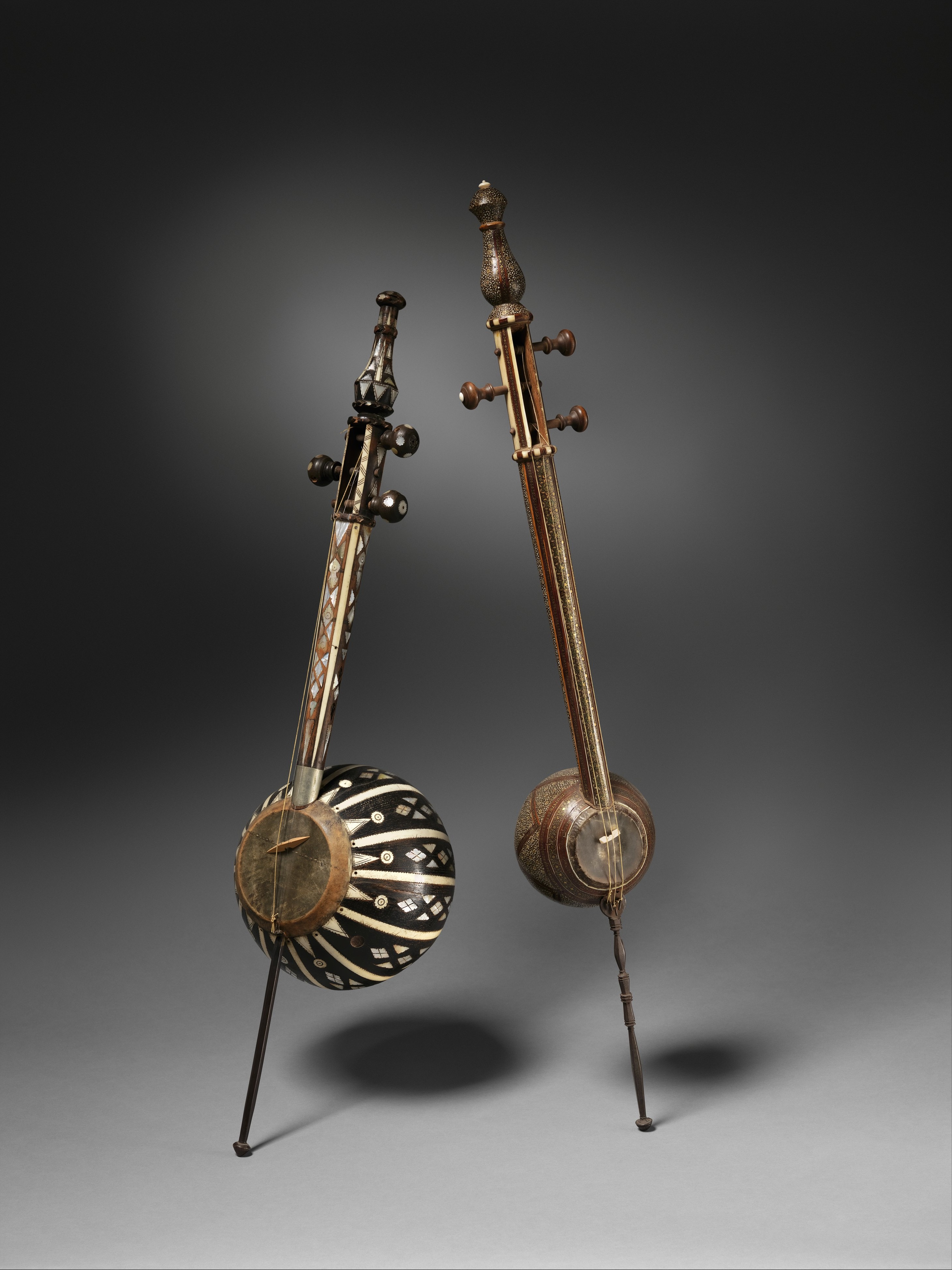
- Persian Kamānches, ca. 1880

String instrument
- Other names: Kamancha, Kamanche, Kemancheh, Kamanjah, Kabak kemane
- Classification: Bowed strings
- Developed: Iran

Playing range
- g3-e7

Related instruments
- Kemancheh Tarhu; Shahkaman; Ghaychak; Rebab; Sorahi; Kemenche

Musicians
- Sayat Nova; Ali-Asghar Bahari; Kayhan Kalhor; Ardeshir Kamkar; Saeed Farajpouri; Habil Aliev; Mehdi Bagheri

Builders
- Ebrahim Ghanbari Mehr; Bayyaz Amir-Ataaie; Saeed Maleki; Qodratollah Kurdi; Emad Kosari

Sound sample
- Kamancheh music Kamancheh Improvisation Played by Kayhan Kalhor – Silk Road Project

Art of crafting and playing with Kamantcheh/Kamancha, a bowed string musical instrument
- UNESCO Intangible Cultural Heritage
- Country: Azerbaijan and Iran
- Reference: 01286

Inscription history
- Inscription: 2017 (13th session)
- List: Representative

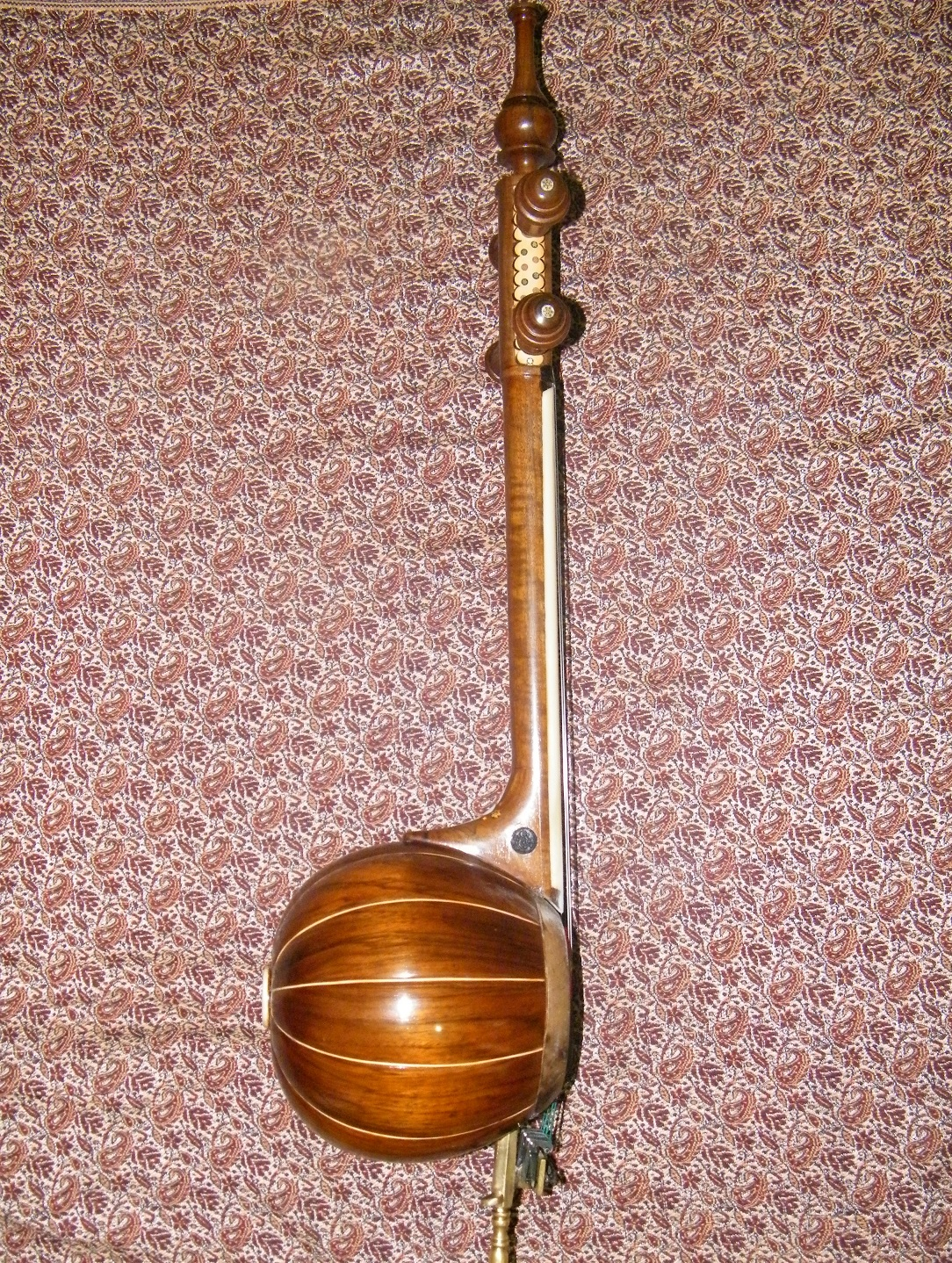
Kamancheh

The kamancheh (Note: Persian: کمانچه, romanized: kamânche; Dari: کمانچه, romanized: kamāncha; Tajik: камонча, romanized: kamoncha; Azerbaijani: kamança; Turkish: kemençe; Georgian: კამანჩა, romanized: k’amancha; Armenian: քամանչա, romanized: qamancha; Kurdish: کەمانچە, romanized: kemançe) is an Iranian bowed string instrument used in Persian, Azerbaijani, Armenian, Kurdish, Georgian, Turkmen, and Uzbek music with slight variations in the structure of the instrument.

The kamancheh is related to the rebab which is the historical ancestor of the kamancheh and the bowed Byzantine lyra. The strings are played with a variable-tension bow.

In 2017, the art of crafting and playing with Kamantcheh/Kamancha was included into the UNESCO Intangible Cultural Heritage Lists of Iran and Azerbaijan.

== Name and etymology ==
The word "kamancheh" means "little bow" in Persian (kæman, bow, and -cheh, diminutive).

The Turkish word kemençe is borrowed from Persian, with the pronunciation adapted to Turkish phonology. It also denotes a bowed string instrument, but the Turkish version differs significantly in structure and sound from the Persian kamancheh.

There is also an instrument called kabak kemane (literally, "pumpkin-shaped bow instrument"), used in Turkish music, which is only slightly different from the Iranian kamancheh.

== Structure ==
The kamancheh has a long neck including the fingerboard, which the kamancheh maker shapes as a truncated inverse cone for easy bow movement in the down section, pegbox in both sides of which four pegs are placed, and finial.

Traditionally kamanchehs had three silk strings, but modern instruments have four metal strings.

Kamanchehs may have highly ornate inlays and elaborately carved ivory tuning pegs.

The body has a long upper neck and a lower bowl-shaped resonating chamber made from a gourd or wood, usually covered with a membrane made from the skin of a lamb, goat or sometimes a fish, on which the bridge is set.

From the bottom protrudes a spike to support the kamancheh while it is being played, hence in English, the instrument is sometimes called the spiked fiddle.

It is played sitting down held like a cello though it is about the length of a viola. The end-pin can rest on the knee or thigh while the player is seated on a chair.

Kamancheh is usually tuned like an ordinary violin (G, D, A, E).

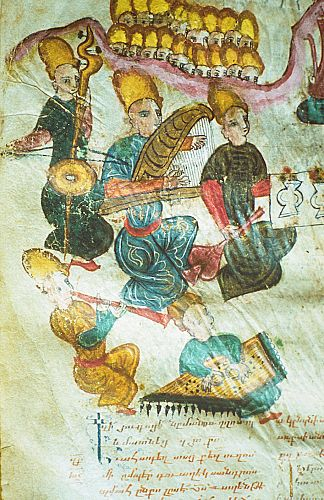
Kamancha in an Armenian miniature, XVI or XVII century.

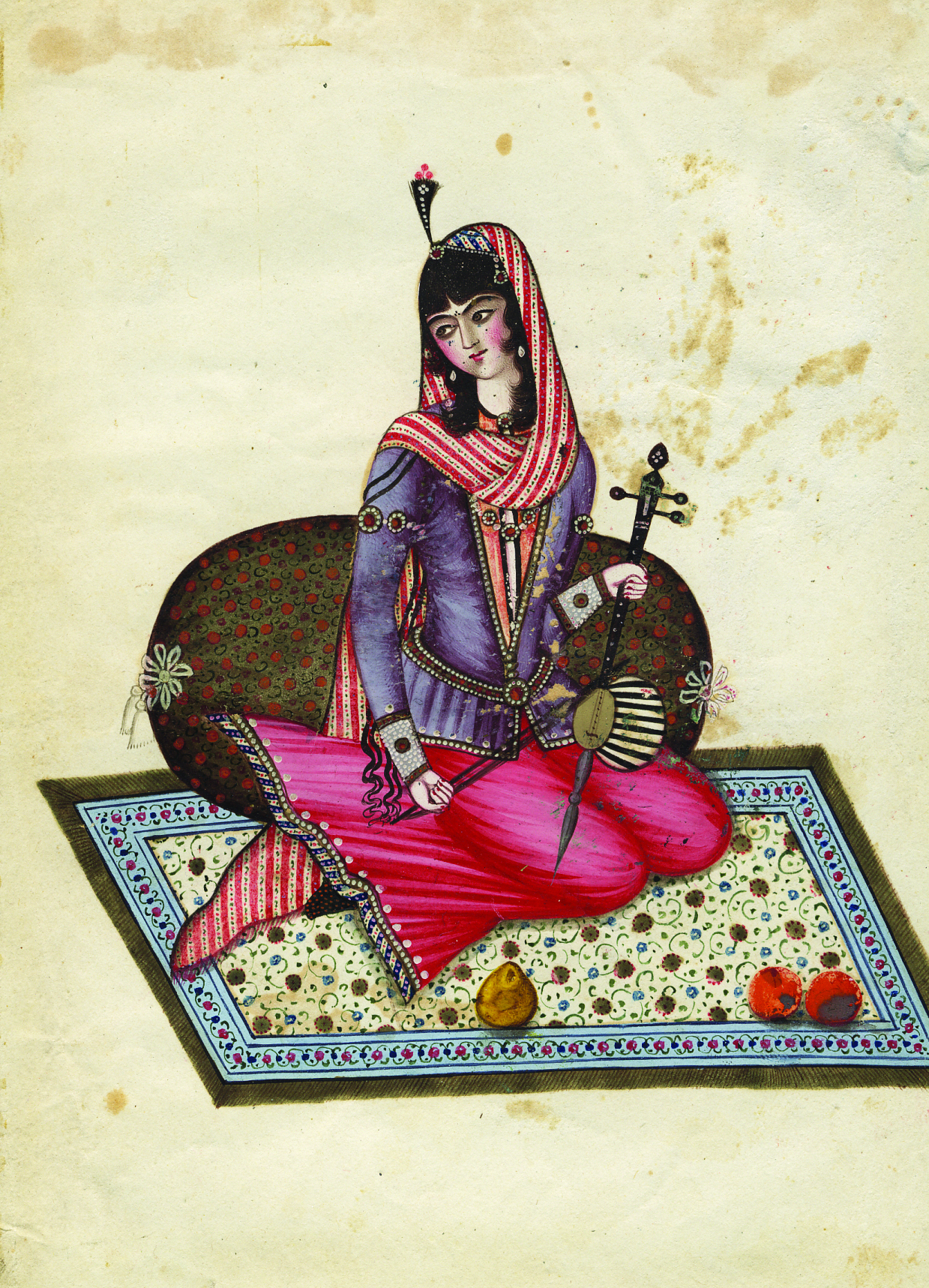
Miniature of a woman playing the kamancheh, 1800–1850, Qajar Iran.

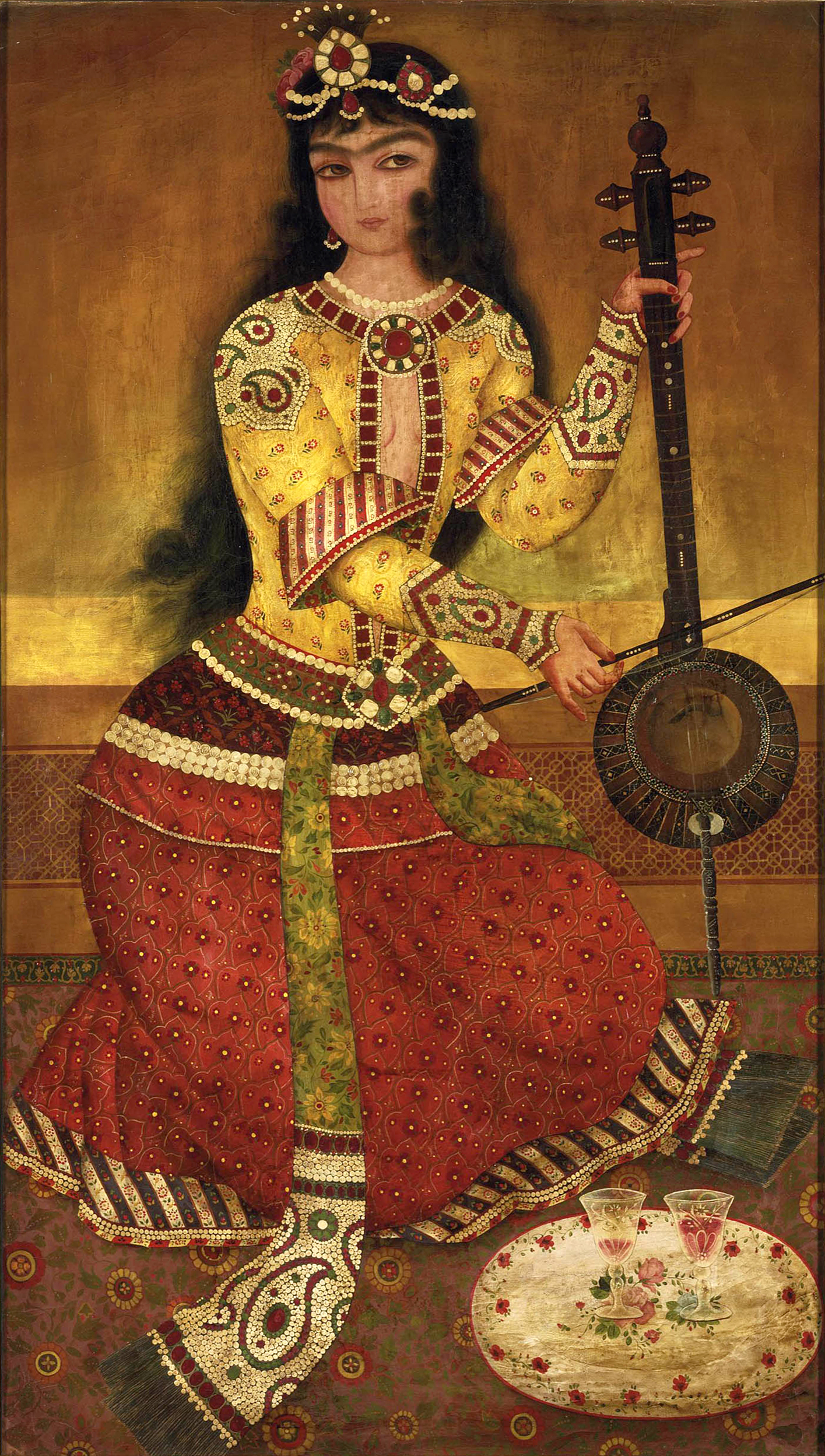
Court musician playing the kamancheh, school of Abu'l Qasim, 1800–1825, Qajar Iran.

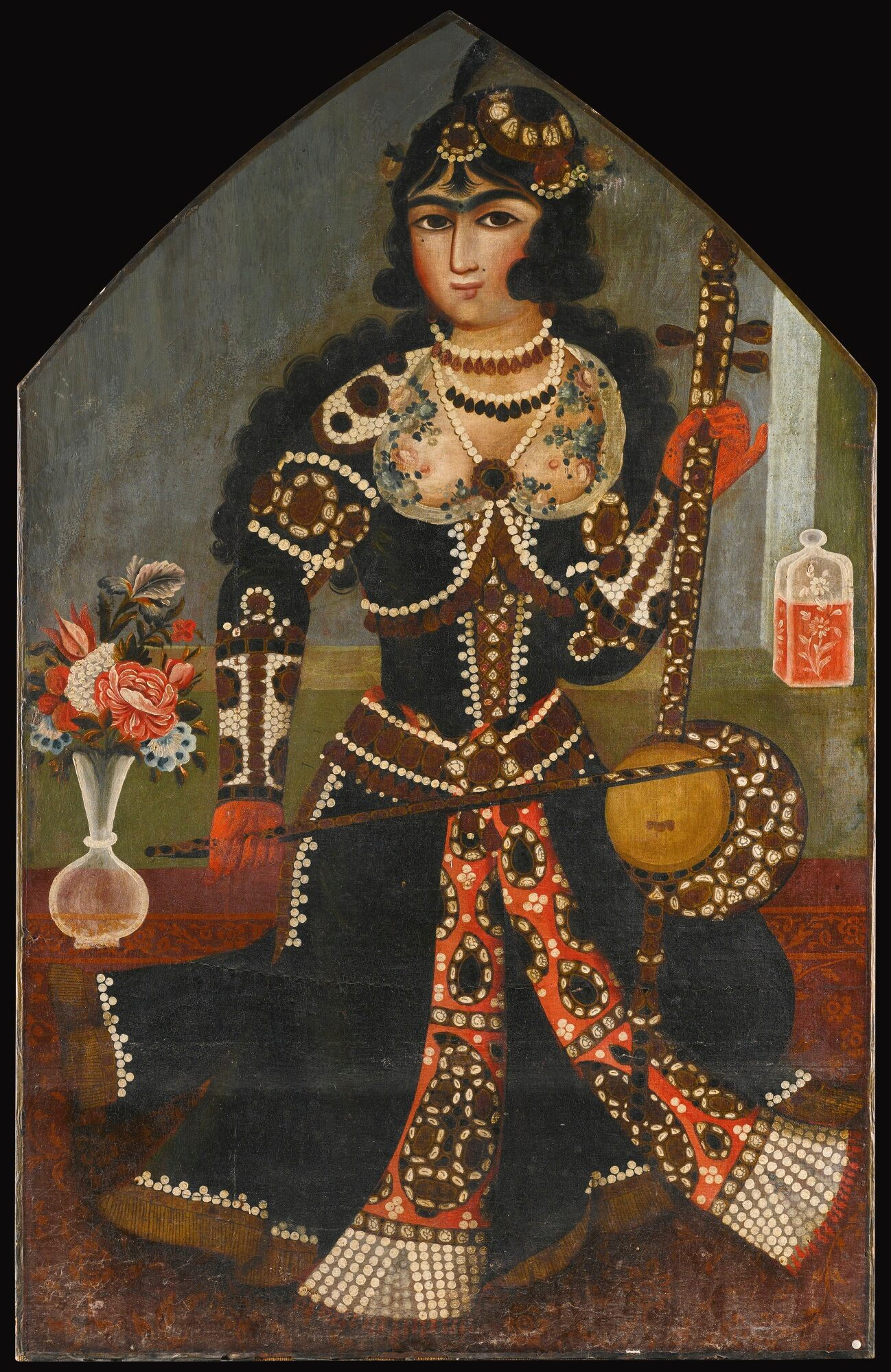
Woman playing the kamancheh, school of Abu'l Qasim, ca. 1820, Qajar Iran.

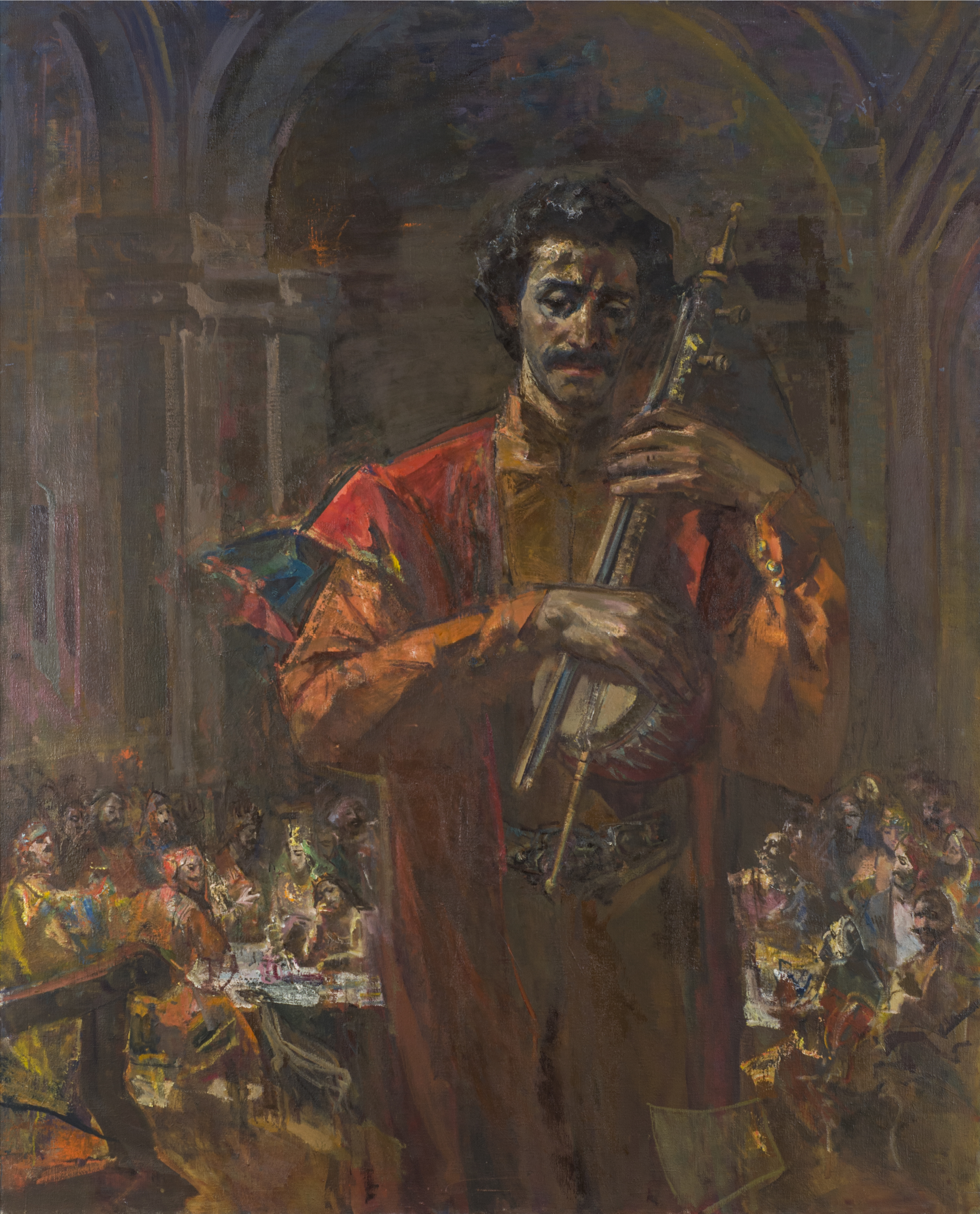
The Armenian ashugh Sayat-Nova playing a kamancheh, ca. 1964.

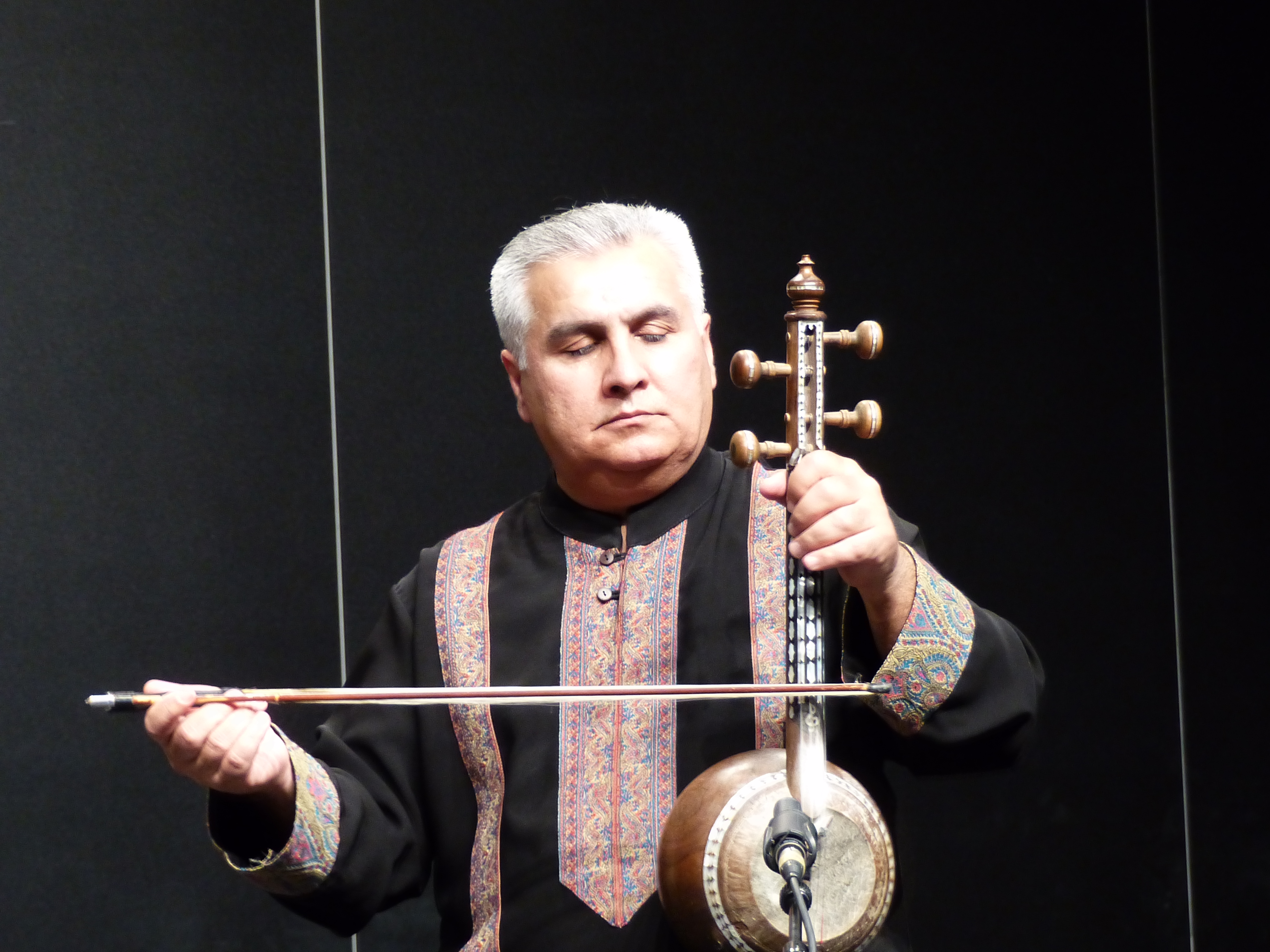
Azerbaijani kamancheh player Malik Mansurov.

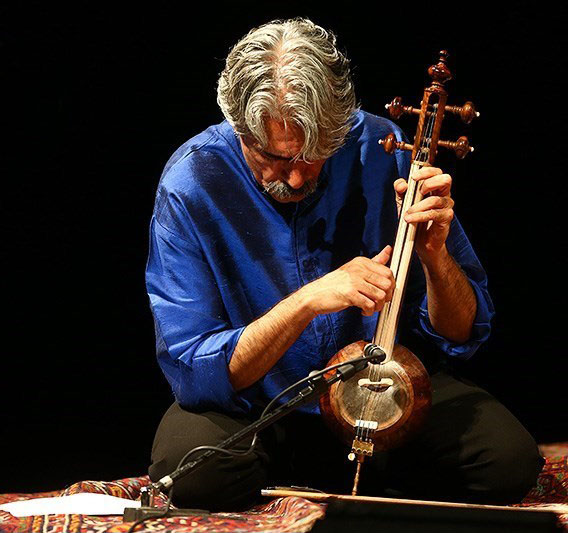
Kayhan Kalhor performance in Vahdat Hall, Tehran, 2016.

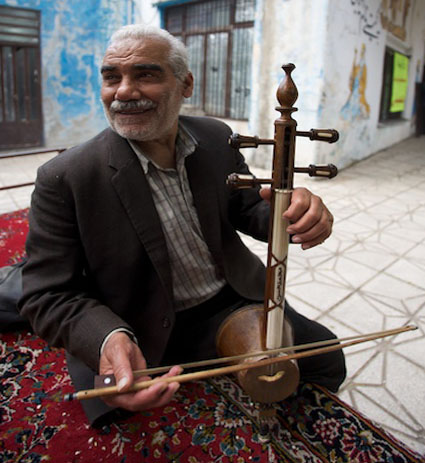
Kamancheh player, Kermanshah, Iran, 2008.

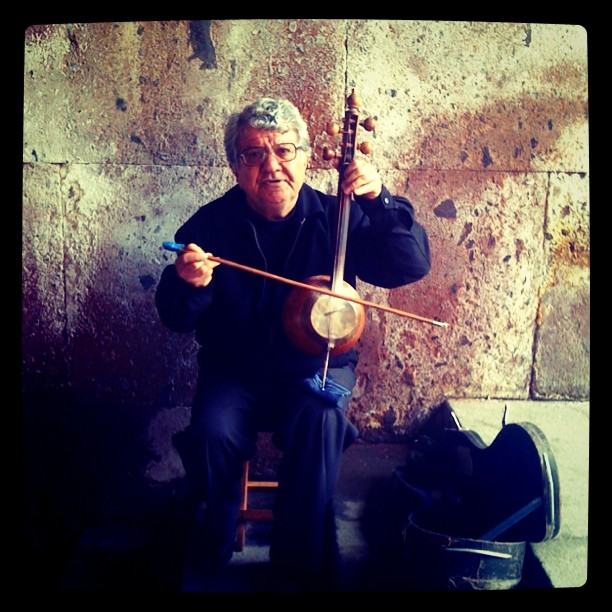
Kamancheh player, Yerevan.

== Notable kamancheh players ==
- Habil Aliyev
- Mehdi Bagheri
- Ali-Asghar Bahari
- Mark Eliyahu
- Kayhan Kalhor
- Ardeshir Kamkar
- Kourosh Babaei
- Sayat-Nova
- Mostafa Taleb
- Yaara Beeri
- Mehrnam Rastegari

== See also ==
- List of bowed stringed instruments
- Music of Armenia
- Music of Iran
- Music of Azerbaijan
- Joze
- Byzantine lira
- Haegeum
- Rebab
- Silk Road Ensemble
