= Nabur =

- Municipality
- Location within Azerbaijan
- Coordinates: 40°37′56″N 48°55′11″E
- Country: Azerbaijan
- Rayon: Gobustan

Population
  - Total: 2,726
- Time zone: UTC+4 (AZT)
  - Summer (DST): UTC+5 (AZT)

Nabur is a village and municipality in the Gobustan Rayon of Azerbaijan. It has a population of 2,726. The municipality consists of the villages of Nabur and Cəngi.

== Notable people ==
- Alim Qasimov, mugham singer
