= Cəngi =

- Location within Azerbaijan
- Coordinates: 40°31′N 49°15′E
- Country: Azerbaijan
- Rayon: Gobustan
- Municipality: Nabur
- Time zone: UTC+4 (AZT)
  - Summer (DST): UTC+5 (AZT)

Cəngi (also known as Dzhangi) is a village in the Gobustan Rayon of Azerbaijan. The village forms part of the municipality of Nabur.
