= Zuleikha Hasanova =

Azerbaijani politician (1923–1985)

Zuleikha Hasanova Züleyxa Həsənova

Minister of Public Services
- In office July 6, 1974 – February 22, 1983
- Preceded by: Zurab Muradaliyev
- Succeeded by: Aydin Mammadov

Chairwoman of the Mingachevir City Executive Committee
- In office 1963–1974

Personal details
- Born: 1923 Shusha, NKAO Azerbaijan SSR, USSR
- Died: 1985
- Party: Communist Party of the Soviet Union

Zuleikha Maharram gizi Hasanova (Azerbaijani: Züleyxa Məhərrəm qızı Həsənova; 1923 – 1985) was a Soviet-Azerbaijani politician (Communist) who served as Minister of Public Services of Azerbaijan SSR in 1974–1983.

== Biography ==
Zuleikha Hasanova was born in 1923 in the city of Shusha, in the family of Maharram Bey Hasanzadeh. When she was two years old, her father died, and at the age of 14, she began working at the Shusha knitting factory, where her mother also worked as a weaver. Later, she became an employee of the district industrial complex.

In early 1942, Hasanova was drafted into the Air Defense Forces of the Soviet Army, serving in the 335th Anti-Aircraft Artillery Regiment (from 1944 — the 131st Anti-Aircraft Artillery Brigade) located north of Baku. After being discharged from the army in 1945, she was employed in the city of Yevlakh, where she worked until 1955. Starting in 1956, she held various positions within the Mingachevir City Committee of the Azerbaijan Communist Party, including instructor, head of department, and secretary. From 1963, Hasanova served as the chair of the Executive Committee of the Mingachevir City Council of Workers' Deputies. She graduated from the Higher Party School under the Central Committee of the Communist Party of Azerbaijan and the Correspondence Higher Party School under the Central Committee of the Communist Party of the Soviet Union.

Starting from July 1974, Zuleykha Hasanova served as the Minister of Public Services of the Azerbaijan SSR. Since 1966, she had been a member of the Inspection Commission of the Azerbaijan Communist Party. She became a member of the All-Union Communist Party (Bolsheviks) (later the Communist Party of the Soviet Union) in 1944. She was elected as a deputy of the Supreme Soviet of the Azerbaijan SSR for the 7th to 10th convocations.

From 1974 until the end of her life, Zuleykha Hasanova lived in Baku. She was buried in the city of Mingachevir, and one of the central streets of the city was named after her.

She died in 1985.
