= Ali-Asghar Bahari =

Iranian musician and kamancheh player

Ali-Asghar Bahari (Persian: علی‌اصغر بهاری) (b. 1905 – d. June 10, 1995) was an Iranian musician and kamancheh player.

He was born in Tehran from Baharian parents and started his music lessons under his grandfather Mohammad Taghi Khan, who was a kamancheh player as well.

He started his own music school in Mashhad, then moved back to Tehran and became a kamancheh instructor in Honarestan under Ruhollah Khaleghi. He toured France, Belgium, Germany, Italy, England and the United States. He died in Tehran on June 10, 1995.

There is a photo of Bahari at this site; he is in the center of the photo.
