= Habil Aliyev =

Azerbaijani musician (1927–2015)

- Born: Habil Mustafa oğlu Əliyev; 28 May 1927; Ağdaş, Azerbaijani SSR
- Died: 8 September 2015 (aged 88) Baku, Azerbaijan
- Genres: Azerbaijani Folk Music, Mugham
- Occupations: Composer; Songwriter
- Instrument: Kamancha
- Years active: 1935 – 2009

Habil Aliyev (Azerbaijani: Habil Mustafa oğlu Əliyev; 28 May 1927 – 8 September 2015) was a prominent Azerbaijani kamancheh player. His music is widely appreciated in the Middle East and Europe.

== Musical career ==
Habil Aliyev's first international performance was in United Kingdom when he was accompanying Rashid Behbudov and Tamara Sinyavskaya. This performances created great resonance and British press quoting Major of Glasgow called Aliyev "Paganini of Azerbaijan". He inspired Israeli musician Mark Eliyahu to play kamancheh.

In 2009, suffering from poor health, he made a symbolic "last concert" at Tehran Roudaki-Wahdat concert hall.

He died in 2015 at the age of 88.

== Influence and legacy ==
In 2014, child music school in Agdash named after him.

== Enregistrements ==
Cinq échantillons musicaux de mugham interprétés par les coryphées de la performance azerbaïdjanaise du mugham (Bahram Mansourov, Ahsan Dadachev, Habil Aliyev, Khan Chouchinsky) sont inclus dans la collection de disques « Anthologies de la musique traditionnelle du monde » préparée à l'ordre de l'UNESCO par l'Institut international de recherche comparée de Berlin en 1979. H. Aliyev a donné une nouvelle vie aux mughams Segah, Bayati-Gadjar, Bastanigar, Bayati-Shiraz, Rahab, Bayati-Kurd, Tchahargah, Rast, Zabul par son interprétation au kamânche.
