= Zurab Muradaliyev =

Azerbaijani politician

Zurab Muradaliyev Zurab Muradəliyev

Minister of Public Services
- In office November 25, 1968 – July 6, 1974
- Preceded by: Nabiba Hasanova
- Succeeded by: Zuleikha Hasanova

First Secretary of the Narimanov District Committee of the Azerbaijan Communist Party
- In office 1961–1968
- Preceded by: Tofig Baghirov

Personal details
- Born: August 25, 1928; Baku, Azerbaijan SSR, USSR
- Died: December 27, 1981 (aged 53)
- Resting place: Second Alley of Honor
- Political party: CPSU (1953–1981)
- Education: Azerbaijan Polytechnic Institute

Zurab Jafar oglu Muradaliyev (Azerbaijani: Zurab (Zürab) Cəfər oğlu Muradəliyev; August 25, 1928 – December 27, 1981) was an Azerbaijani politician who served as the Minister of Public Services of the Azerbaijan SSR from 1968 to 1974.

== Biography ==
Zurab Muradaliyev was born in 1928 in Baku to a family of a civil servant. After graduating from the Baku Railway Technical College, he started his career as a test technician in 1947. He worked as a road service engineer, mechanical engineer. Simultaneously, he pursued his education and graduated from the Azerbaijan Polytechnic Institute in 1957.

In 1955, Zurab Muradaliyev was elected the Secretary of the Dzerzhinsky District (later Narimanov District) Committee, and from 1956, he worked as the Secretary of the Baku City Committee of the Leninist Young Communist League of Azerbaijan. In 1959, he was promoted to the position of the head of the organizational department of the Baku City Committee of the Azerbaijan Communist Party. In 1961–1968, he was the First Secretary of the Narimanov District Committee of the Azerbaijan Communist Party. Zurab Muradaliyev was appointed the Minister of Public Services of the Azerbaijan SSR in November 1968. From 1974 until the last days of his life, he worked as the head of the foreign-economic relations department in the Affairs Department of the Council of Ministers of the Azerbaijan SSR.

Zurab Muradaliyev was a candidate member of the Central Committee of the Azerbaijan Communist Party, and was elected deputy of the sixth, seventh and eighth convocations of the Supreme Soviet of the Azerbaijan SSR. He was awarded the orders of Red Banner of Labour, and Badge of Honour, as well as medals of the Soviet Union.

Zurab Muradaliyev died on December 27, 1981. He was buried in the Second Alley of Honor.
