= Mark Eliyahu =

Israeli musician

Mark Eliyahu מארק אליהו
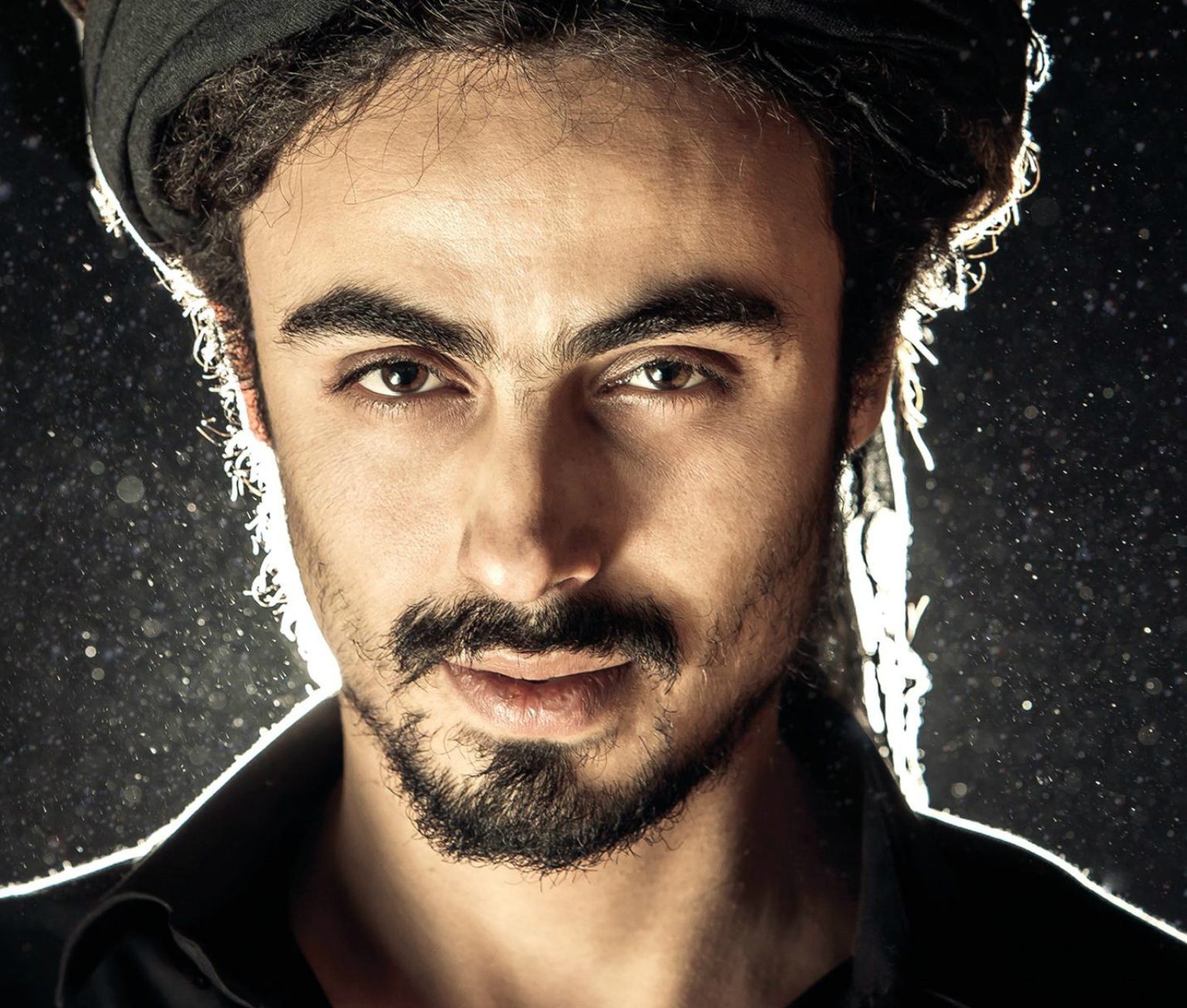

Background information
- Born: 13 July 1982 (age 44)
- Origin: Soviet Dagestan, Russian SFSR, USSR
- Genre: Folk
- Occupation: Musician
- Instruments: Kamancheh, bağlama
- Years active: 1998–present
- Website: http://markeliyahu.com

Mark Eliyahu (Hebrew: מארק אליהו; born 13 July 1982) is an Israeli musician. He plays the kamancheh.

== Early life ==
"This was the first time I heard this sound, but I felt as though I had always heard it within me, as though it were my own inner voice. I had chills, and I knew definitively that I had to quit the saz, and start playing this new instrument. When I told my father about this, he was very moved. As it turns out, my great grandfather was a kamancheh player in Dagestan."

— Eliyahu on the beginning of his career Interview with Boulder Jewish News

Eliyahu was born in 1982 in Soviet Dagestan and immigrated to Israel with his parents in 1989. At age 16, he was inspired by Habil Aliyev's performance, a prominent kamancheh player, and moved to Baku, Azerbaijan to learn kamancheh under the guidance of renowned player Adalat Vazirov. Eliyahu's father was a composer, and his mother played the violin.

== Musical career ==
In 1999, Eliyahu participated in The Spirit of the East – a concert and album directed and composed by his father, Peretz Eliyahu, with the participation of the Azerbaijani mugham singers Alim Qasimov and his daughter Farghana Qasimova and other artists. On that year he also performed as a soloist with the Israel Chamber Orchestra of Ramat Gan in an Israeli festival. In 2004, he recorded his first solo album Voices of Judea and performed with his ensemble throughout Europe and Israel.

In 2019, Mark Eliyahu visited Azerbaijan for the second time and gave a live concert.

In 2020, he composed and performed the theme music for Tehran, the Emmy award-winning Israeli political espionage series.

Eliyahu's work has gained some popularity among Iranian listeners, especially those who attend his concerts in Turkey.

== Filmography ==
Films
Year	Title	Role	Notes
2012	Balada Le'aviv Habohe	Himself	Main Role
2020	Tehran (TV series)	Composer	Theme music
