= Baku Polytechnicum =

Baku Polytechnic University

- Bakı Politexnikumu
- Type: Public
- Active: 1887–1920
- Location: Baku, Azerbaijan

Baku Polytechnicum (Azerbaijani: Bakı Politexnikumu) was a technical university that was established in 1887 in Baku, when it was under Russian rule. By 1910 it had integrated a curriculum related to the growing petroleum industry. However, the ratio of Azeris to non-Azeris was so skewed that of the 494 students studying at the school in 1916, only 20 were Azeri. On November 14, 1920, after the invasion of the Red Army and the establishment of the fledgling Azerbaijan SSR, the new government decreed that Baku Polytechnicum would close and be replaced by Baku Polytechnical Institute, a more traditional polytechnic institute and the beginnings of the current incarnation of Azerbaijan State Oil Academy.

On December 12, 1920, the National Education Committee announced a special decree stating that Baku Polytechnicum was liquidated and its teachers' staff were to be free from their duties.

== See also ==
- Azerbaijan Technical University
- Petroleum industry in Azerbaijan
- Mir-Babayev M.F. Establishment of the first oil institute in Transcaucasia, "Reservoir", Canada, 2011, volume 38, issue 8, September, p. 31-37.
