= Love's Deep Ocean =

Studio album by Alim Qasimov and Farghana Qasimova
- Released: 11 January 2000
- Genre: Mugham, world music
- Length: 1:10:01
- Label: Network

Love's Deep Ocean is a studio album by the Alim Qasimov and Farghana Qasimova. The album contains nine compositions based on mugham.

== Track listing ==
| No. | Title | Writer(s) | Length |
|---|---|---|---|
| 1. | "Bagishla Mani" | Traditional | 6:25 |
| 2. | "Shushtar Magamunda Bastachar Mahnelare (Gäl Gäl)" | Traditional | 7:11 |
| 3. | "Iraq Tasnifi" | Traditional | 2:51 |
| 4. | "Mugham Qatar" | Traditional | 9:20 |
| 5. | "Rang Shushtar" | Traditional | 6:26 |
| 6. | "Ey Encanlar" | Alim Qasimov | 14:40 |
| 7. | "Shirvan Shikastasi" | Traditional | 9:37 |
| 8. | "Raqs (Balaban Solo)" | Traditional | 3:55 |
| 9. | "Fizuli Ghazal" | Alim Qasimov | 9:35 |

== Critical reception ==
"Bağışla məni"
from Love's Deep Ocean
Demonstrating the mugham style

According to Kieran McCarthy, writing for AllMusic, "Stretching through the uppermost limits of a majestic falsetto, dancing from pitch to pitch with unimaginable ease, this man's voice is truly something to behold." Ken Hunt, in the Milwaukee Journal Sentinel, wrote that "lyrics dwell on love in its manifold manifestations, often presented in allegory just as Azerbaijani cuisine wraps ingredients in vine leaves."

== See also ==
- Meykhana
