= Coldünya =

Azerbaijani rock band

- Origin: Baku, Azerbaijan
- Genres: Alternative rock
- Years active: 1992 – present
- Members: Teymur Nadir (vocals); Rovshan Karimov (vocals, guitar); Samir Jafaali (drums); Aydin Hajiyev (bass guitar)

Coldünya (Cyrillic-script Azerbaijani: Колдүнја, IPA: [koldynˈjɑ]) is an Azerbaijani rock band based in Baku. The members are Teymur Nadir (vocals), Rovshan Karimov (vocals, guitar), Samir Jafaali (drums) and Aydin Hajiyev (bass guitar).

The band's name combines the English word "Cold" and the Azerbaijani word Dünya (meaning "World"). They are among the prominent Azerbaijani bands of the late 20th and early 21st centuries.

== History ==
In 1996, Coldünya recorded and released their first album, Nota Bene, and filmed their first video, "Sehrbaz", which was broadcast and promoted by ANS Radio and ANS TV. Their song "Sehrbaz" was broadcast within two weeks in BBC Radio's Top of the Pops show, presented by Mark Goodier, and took 7th place in BBC's foreign hit-list.

== Discography ==
=== Albums ===
- Nota Bene (1996)
- Demo (1999)
- Məktub (2002)
- Oyanış (December 2003) with Alim Qasimov
- Əhatə Dairəsi Xaricində (2009)
