= Gashimov =

Gashimov (Azerbaijani: Həşimov) is an Azerbaijani surname. Notable people with the surname include:

- Vugar Gashimov (1986–2014), Azerbaijani chess player
- Zaur Gashimov (born 1981), Azerbaijani footballer

== See also ==
- Gasimov
