= Nazokat Kasimova =

Uzbekistani political scientist

- Born: 1969 (age 56–57); Tashkent, Uzbek SSR, USSR
- Citizenship: USSR → Uzbekistan
- Education: Tashkent State University, University of Washington
- Scientific career
- Fields: history, political science, foreign policy, and international relations
- Academic advisors: Goga Hidoyatov

Nazokat Anvarovna Kasimova (Uzbek: Nazokat Anvarovna Qosimova) (born 1969) is an Uzbek political scientist, Doctor of Political Science, professor, a leading expert of Uzbekistan on international systems and political issues of global development, regional integration, and regional security, as well as a national expert on higher education reform in Uzbekistan.

== Biography ==
Nazokat Kasimova was born in 1969 in Tashkent. Her father, Anvar Kasymov, is an Uzbek orientalist, Indologist, Turkologist, a specialist in foreign policy and international relations, a Doctor of Historical Sciences, a professor, and a distinguished mentor of the Republic of Uzbekistan. She is also the author of several dozen scientific books .

In 1991, she graduated from the Faculty of History at the National University of Uzbekistan (Tashkent State University). In 1995, she defended her doctoral thesis on the topic of diplomatic relations between the US, Germany, Great Britain, and the USSR on the eve of World War II.

In 2002, she defended her doctoral thesis at the University of World Economy and Diplomacy (UWED) on the politico-economic aspects of the US's participation in regional integration processes. In 1993–1994, she studied in the graduate program at Washington University.

In 2000, she completed an internship at the Woodrow Wilson International Center (Washington) and, in 2008, at Tsukuba University (Japan). In 2011, at the American University/Fulbright Program.

Nazokat Kasimovais a member of the expert group on higher education reform at the Ministry of Higher Education, Science, and Innovation of Uzbekistan. She has also collaborated with several international organizations and projects, such as Futures Group International, EPOS Health Management, World Vision, Save the Children, the United Nations Development Program, and CEP. Nazokat Kasimova is a professor at the Tashkent State University of Oriental Studies.

== Scientific works ==
Nazokat Kasymova is the author of over 50 scientific articles, such as:

- Sovetsko-germanskiy pakt o nenapadenii i pozitsiya Soyedinennix Shtatov Ameriki: avtoreferat diss. kandidata istoricheskix nauk: 07.00.03.- Toshkent, 1995.- 26 s.: il.
- NAFTA: Predposilki sozdaniya i tendensiya razvitiya. «Ssha. Kanada: Ekonomika, politika, kul’tura» Date: 9 January 2001 (USA-No.009).
- Natsionalnыe modeli inostrannoy pomoshi. Jurnal Vestnik MGIMO universiteta Vыpusk № 6/2011, GRNTI: 11-Politika i politicheskiye nauki.
- Inostrannaya pomosh i razvitiye v usloviyax globalizatsii. Jurnal Vestnik MGIMO universiteta Vipusk № 6/2011, GRNTI: 11-Politika i politicheskiye nauki.
- Sodeystviye mejdunarodnix organizatsiy v podderjanii stabilnosti i bezopasnosti v Sentralnoy Azii, Toshkent, 2008.
- Bolonskiy protsess: tendensii razvitiya i komanda natsionalnix ekspertov Bolonskiy protsess: tendensii razvitiya i komanda natsionalnix ekspertov.
- Reforma vishego obrazovaniya v Uzbekistane i elementi Bolonskogo protsessa.

== Links ==
- сайт Випперсоны
- Эксперты Узбекистана
- Касымова Назокат Анваровна
- Национальная команда экспертов
- Касымова Назокат Анваровна
- Диссертация
- Национальные модели иностранной помощи
- Журнал Вестник МГИМО №6/2011
- Национальные модели иностранной помощи
- НАФТА: Предпосылки создания и тенденция развития
- Международная конференция "Проблемы обеспечения безопасности и устойчивого развития в Центральной Азии"
- Лица
- Поиск центра регионального сотрудничества в ЦА вызывает неприятие игроков: эксперт
- Взорвет ли Афганистан Центральную Азию?
- Болонский процесс: тенденции развития и команда национальных экспертов Болонский процесс: тенденции развития и команда национальных экспертов
- Фонд Спасите Детей Великобритания
- Заседание «Круглого стола» Темпус в Доме Европы
- Экспертный форум по вопросам политики США в Афганистане и Центральной Азии
- Торговля людьми – в центре дебатов Модели ООН
- Цели, результаты и перспективы политики США в Афганистане и Центральной Азии
- Политика США и водные ресурсы Центральной Азии
- Ерасмус в Узбекистане
- Межгосударственное сотрудничество в Средней Азии необходимо для сохранения воды
- Анализ изучения потребностей, планирование программы
- Реформа высшего образования в Узбекистане и элементы Болонского процесса
- Обеспечение качества высшего образования в контексте Болонского процесса
