= Farhad Karibov =

Azerbaijani politician (1952–2024)

- Fərhad Qəribov

Member of the National Assembly of Azerbaijan
- In office 2005–2015

Personal details
- Born: 20 June 1952; Muradxan, Azerbaijan SSR, USSR
- Died: 25 December 2024 (aged 72)
- Political party: YAP
- Occupation: Lawyer

Farhad Karibov (20 June 1952 – 25 December 2024) was an Azerbaijani politician. A member of the New Azerbaijan Party, he served in the National Assembly of Azerbaijan from 2005 to 2015.

Karibov died on 25 December 2024, at the age of 72.
