= Jabbar Gasimov =

Poster artist based in Azerbaijan (1935–2002)

- Azerbaijani: Cabbar Qasımov
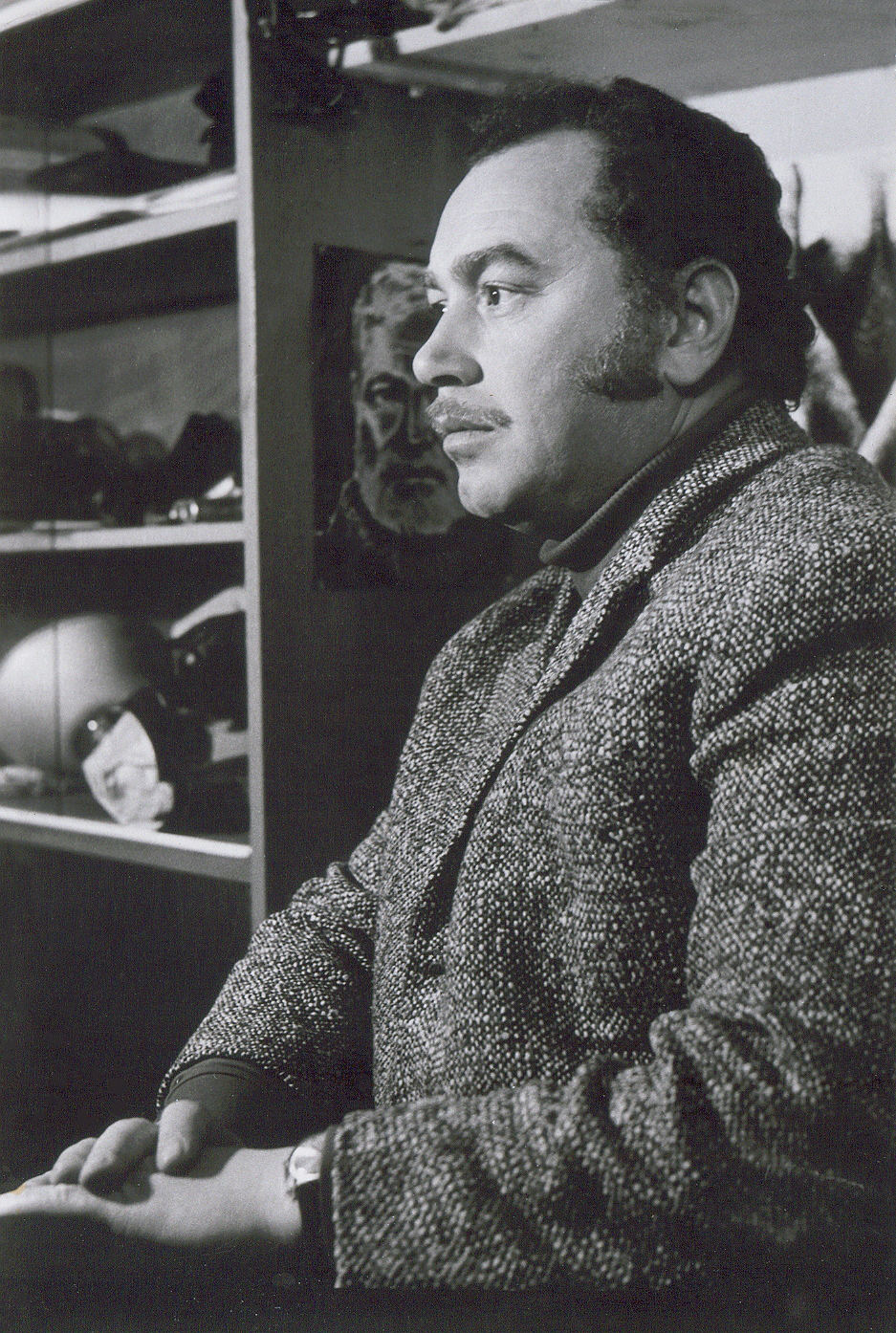
- Born: February 9, 1935; Baku, Azerbaijan SSR, TSFSR, USSR
- Died: October 19, 2002 (aged 67)
- Education: Azerbaijan State Art School named after Azim Azimzade; Moscow State Art Institute named after V. Surikov
- Known for: poster artist
- Awards: People's Artist of the Republic of Azerbaijan Honored Art Worker of the Azerbaijan SSR

Jabbar Aghadadash oghlu Gasimov (Azerbaijani: Cabbar Ağadadaş oğlu Qasımov; 9 February 1935 – 19 October 2002) was an Azerbaijani poster artist, People's Artist of the Republic of Azerbaijan.

== Biography ==
Jabbar Gasimov was born on February 9, 1935, in Baku. In 1956, he graduated from Azerbaijan State Art School named after Azim Azimzade, and in 1963, from Moscow State Art Institute named after V. Surikov. Jabbar Gasimov was elected a member of the Union of Artists of Azerbaijan in 1965, a member of the Presidium of the Union and chairman of poster department.

Professor Jabbar Gasimov also worked in the field of pedagogy, worked for many years at the Azerbaijan State University of Culture and Arts and Azerbaijan State Academy of Art.

J. Gasimov died on October 19, 2002.

== Career ==
Jabbar Gasimov started his career as a poster artist and was recognized as a leading artist in this field in Azerbaijan. He also created paintings, book graphics and monumental art. "Towards the victory of communism through Lenin" (1970), "Peace to the children of the planet", "Protect the land and love it" have an important place in the artist's work.

His poster "Our goal is to build" was considered exemplary at the creative conference of Transcaucasian poster artists in 1965 and was awarded a diploma of Artists' Union of the USSR.

Jabbar Gasimov's works have been demonstrated at exhibitions in Azerbaijan and other countries in different years, and have been repeatedly awarded diplomas and honorary degrees.

== Awards ==
- Honored Art Worker of the Azerbaijan SSR — 1 December 1982
- People's Artist of the Republic of Azerbaijan — 30 May 2002
