= Farghana Qasimova =

Azerbaijani mugham singer (born 1979)

Fərqanə Qasımova
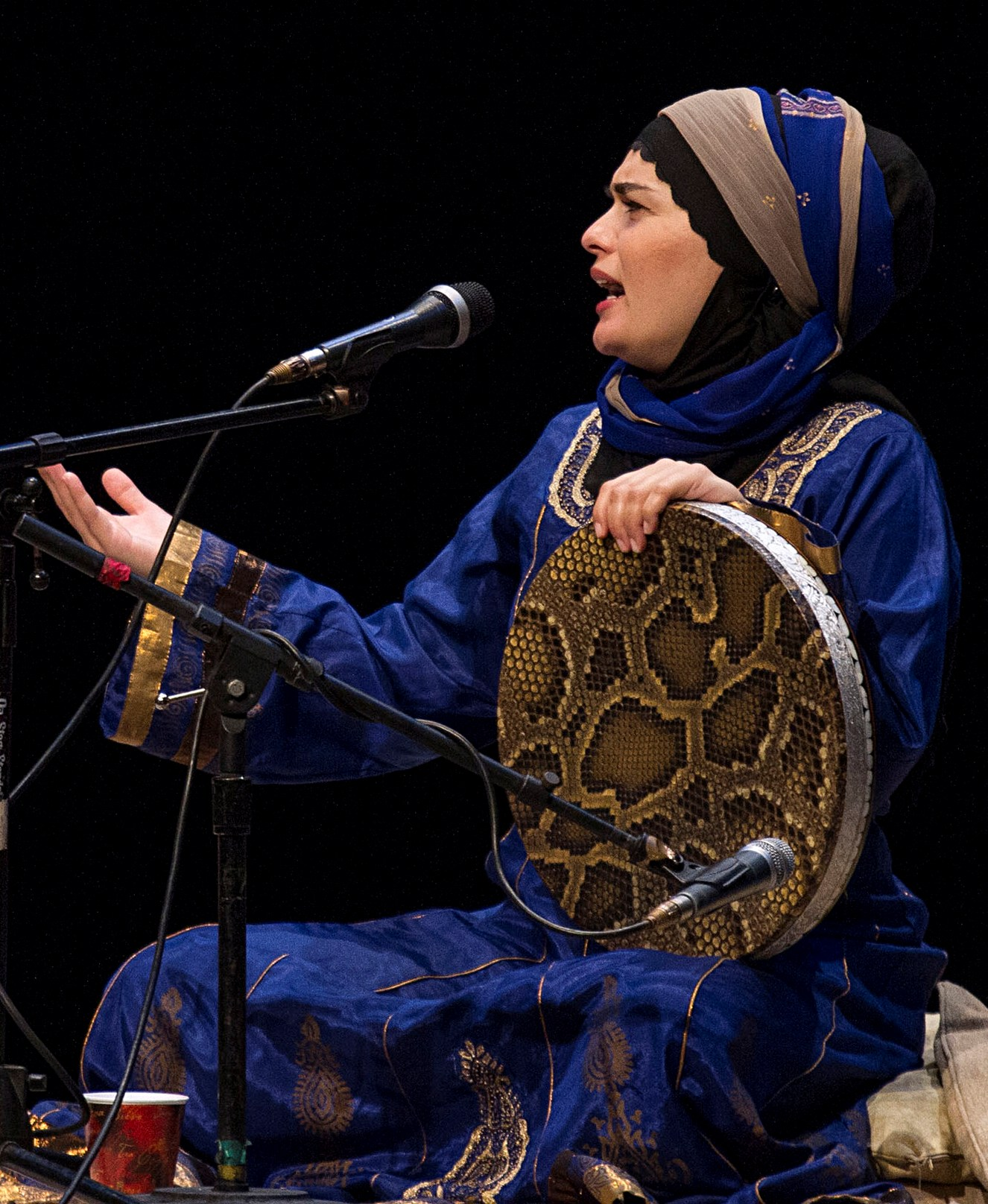
- Qasimova in 2014

Background information
- Born: August 6, 1979 (age 47)
- Origin: Şamaxı, Azerbaijani SSR, USSR
- Genre: Mugham
- Occupation: Musician
- Instruments: Singing, daf
- Years active: 1996–present

Fərqanə Alim qızı Qasımova (born August 6, 1979) is an Azerbaijani mugham singer in Azerbaijan. She is the daughter of famous mugham singer Alim Qasımov. She has twice received presidential awards for the promotion of Azerbaijani music, in 2012 and 2014.

== Biography ==
In 1995, at the age of sixteen, Qasımova joined Alim Qasımov on his concert tour to Germany for the first time. By the age of twenty she had become a full-fledged singer in her own right, and Qasımov chose to include her daughter in her ensemble. Qasımova first appeared on 1997's The Legendary Art of Mugham, on which the two shared vocal tasks on the song Getme Getme. Their next album included a track, Bagishlamani, dedicated to her colleague, Nusrat Fateh Ali Khan. The release marked a high point for Qasımov as it was her first widely available release to western audiences and it proved a critical success. Qasımova's efforts, with her father's guidance, to reconnect younger generations with mugham began to pay dividends; not only was appealing to traditional Islamic sections of the Azerbaijani population, but also to more Americanised and modern audiences. The breakthrough amongst the younger generations spurred her on: "Sometimes young people come up after a concert to thank me. That's like giving me wings. I feel so elated when I can awaken such feelings in people while they are still young; mugham is not an easy genre for young people to understand".

"Although I am her father, we have taken the journey in mugham together. Though I had begun earlier, it was with her birth that my own work became serious, or professional. Before then, I was just a playful young man in love with mugham.""

— Alim Qasımov on his daughter, Fərqanə Qasımova Interview with Al-Ahram Weekly

In 1999, Qasımova with her father participated in “The Spirit of the East” concert directed and composed by Israeli Mizrahi musician Peretz Eliyahu and Mark Eliyahu.

In 2007, she recorded and released further Central Asian Series, Vol. 6: Spiritual Music of Azerbaijan with her father. She also took the opportunity to perform in New York City in 2005 as part of Yo-Yo Ma's Silk Road Project. The concert aimed to promote multi-cultural artistic exchange between eastern and western cultures and The New York Times regarded her performance, alongside Malik Mansurov and Rauf Islamov, as the highlight of the event.

In 2002, she made her first appearance as a soloist at the Women's Voices Festival in Belgium.

In 2014, she released Yalnız Ona Doğru, which became her first album. In the same year, she gave her first solo concert in Baku.

In 2026, Alim Qasımov and Fərqanə Qasımova's cover of Nelly Furtado's Say It Right was featured on the in-game radio of Rockstar Games' video game Grand Theft Auto VI.

== Discography ==
=== Albums ===
- The Legendary Art of Mugham (October 15, 1997) with Alim Qasımov Ensemble
- Love's Deep Ocean (October 11, 1999) with Alim Qasımov
- Central Asian Series, Vol. 6: Spiritual Music of Azerbaijan (September 25, 2007) with Alim Qasımov
- "Intimate dialogue" – Live at Morgenland Festival Osnabrück 2009 with Alim Qasımov
- Durnalar (May 12, 2014)
