= Alim Qasımov =

Azerbaijani mugham singer (born 1957)

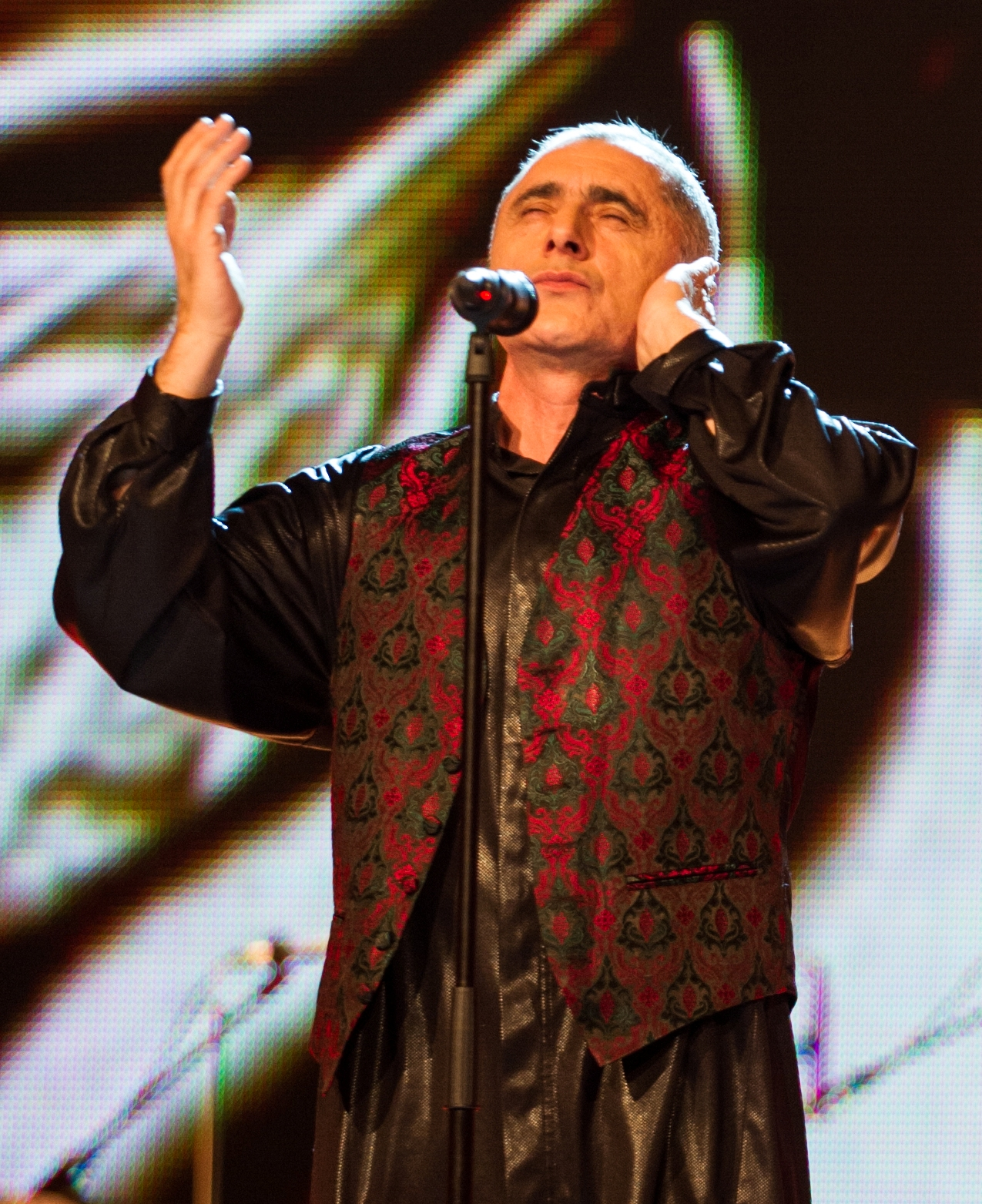

Background information
- Born: August 14, 1957 (age 69); Nabur, Shamakhi District, Azerbaijani SSR, USSR
- Origin: Shamakhi, Azerbaijan
- Genre: Mugham
- Occupation: Musician
- Instruments: Singing, Daf
- Years active: 1977–present
- Website: Alim Qasımov on Facebook

Alim Həmzə oğlu Qasımov (born August 14, 1957) is an Azerbaijani musician and one of the most major mugham singers in Azerbaijan. He was awarded the International Music Council-UNESCO Music Prize in 1999, one of the highest international prizes for music. His music is characterized by his vocal improvisation and represents a move away from the traditional style of mugham. Qasımov has recorded nine albums, three of which are mugham albums with his daughter, Farghana Qasımova.

According to The New York Times, "Qasımov is simply one of the greatest singers alive, with a searing spontaneity that conjures passion and devotion, contemplation and incantation."

He joined fellow Azerbaijani Sabina Babayeva on stage at the Grand Finale of the Eurovision Song Contest 2012 in Baku to sing back vocals for her entry, "When the Music Dies." Additionally, Qasımov was featured as part of the opening act of the Grand Final.

== Early life ==
Born in 1957, Qasımov grew up in Nabur of Shamakhi, Azerbaijan, a village 100 km north of the capital Baku. His family worked on a Soviet commune and Qasımov worked alongside his parents from a young age. He later reflected that growing up in poverty helped him to live modestly later in life and he never attempted to extricate himself from his peasant background. Qasımov's father was an occasional singer with a good voice but he was a humble man; he never pursued a professional career in singing. Qasımov on the other hand was a keen singer from a young age and his parents noticed his musical desire. Lacking the money to buy him an instrument, his father used a frame and a goat's stomach lining to make a crude drum for his son.

"I didn't have any other choice besides music, I didn't have any other talent, and I couldn't see myself doing anything else. I was faced with the harsh reality - either singing or nothing."

— Qasimov on the beginning of his career Interview with Azerbaijan International

He began singing at religious events, and his parents suggested that he study music at school. The form proved difficult for him at times: once, while performing in a local music contest at the age of fourteen, the audience—thinking he did not grasp the correct traditional style—laughed him off the stage. Despite various setbacks, his parents urged him to persist, and he did, enrolling in the state music school in Baku at the age of 21 years. The course consisted of four years of study, specializing in vocal technique and mugham—the repertoire of classical Azerbaijani song. It was here that Qasımov honed his voice, and his teachers were so impressed that they encouraged him to take the final exams two years early. He refused, stating that he still needed time to perfect his abilities. He had realized that music was no longer a pastime for him, but rather a necessity, saying his sole talent and desire was for music. Over the final years of his study, he refined his vocal technique, easily passing the final exam, but he later reflected that he had placed too much emphasis on vocal perfection; he believed it was not until later that he fully understood the deeper content and emotion of mugham.

== Musical career ==
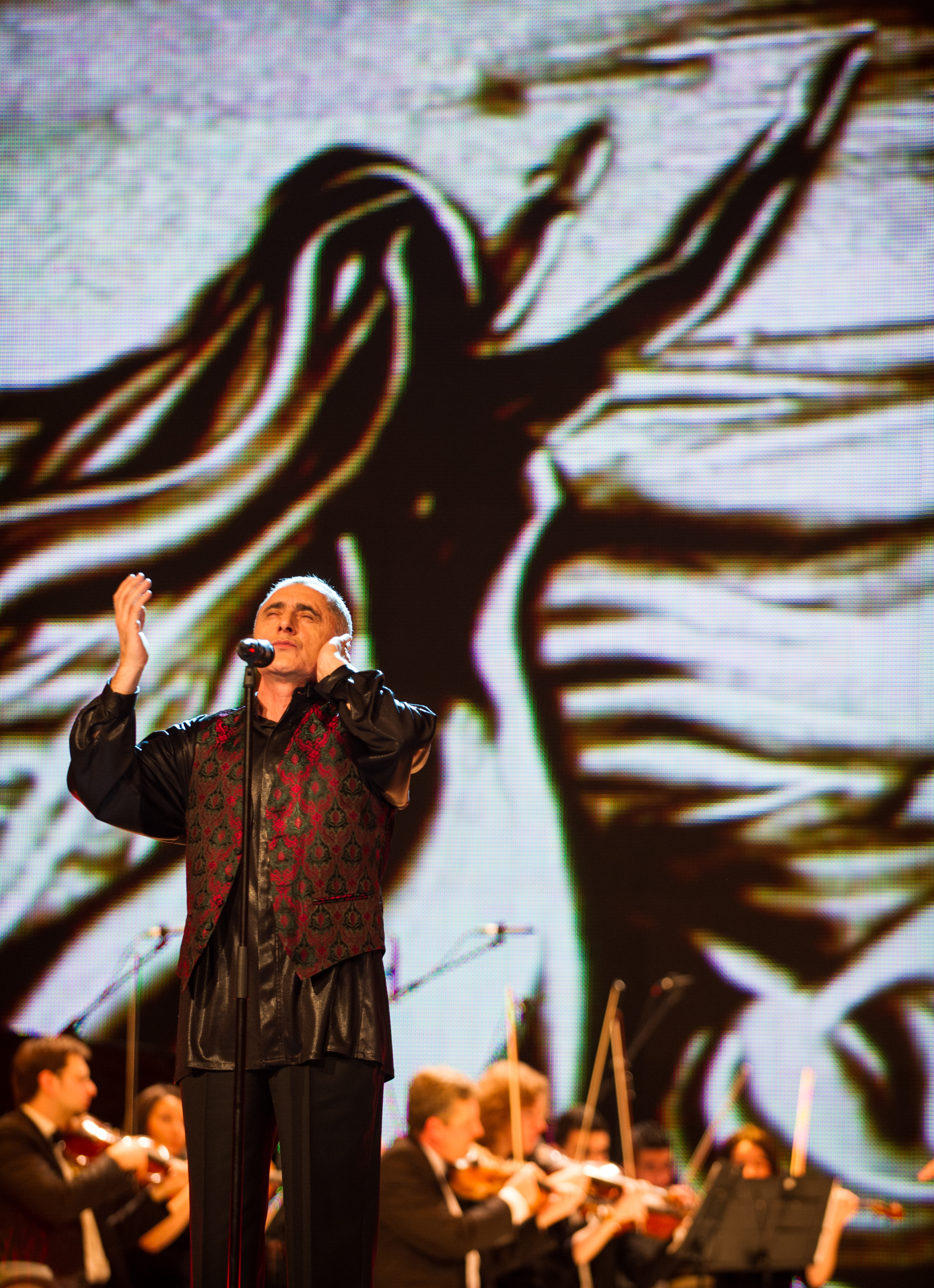
Alim Gasimov on the semi-final allocation draw ceremony of Eurovision Song Contest 2012

Qasımov began singing professionally while Azerbaijan was still under Soviet rule and the mugham form had not received support from the state. Performances were restricted, and, while a few singers aimed to preserve the history of the traditional style, the ruling communist party largely regarded it as a local curiosity. However, Qasımov's growing popularity was accompanied by declining Soviet influence, and in 1983 he won the national Jabbar Garyaghdioghlu Singing Competition.

"I believe that the person who grows up in a village is inspired by the sounds of nature. Those who have grown up in cities are exposed to a uniformity of electronic sounds, from television and the streets".

— Qasimov on inspiration and influence Interview with Al-Ahram Weekly

As his career progressed, he was recognized internationally, winning awards at the 1983 and 1987 UNESCO Symposia on Traditional and Modern Art of Central Asian and Asian Countries. His tours were very well received in both his home country and abroad; as travel outside the Soviet Union was rare for citizens at the time, his tours and concerts garnered much press and many television announcements. As his career was blossoming, so was his personal life—Qasımov and his wife, Tamilla Aslanova, had their first child in 1980, Ferghana Qasımova, and later had two more children: a son, Gadir, and a second daughter, Dilruba. Despite such changes, Qasımov's background continued to shape his personality and music, dismissing the foreign influences found in cities and television.

Over time, Qasımov's style had developed to include not only traditional Azerbaijani music and mugham, but also ashiq, a rural bardic tradition with roots in Turkey, Azerbaijan, and the Azeri region of Iran. In addition, he was influenced by artists from other disciplines, placing particular importance on Qawwali singer Nusrat Fateh Ali Khan: "When I heard him in concert, many doors were opened for me and many questions answered". His success was all the more impressive because he had broken from the traditional style of mugham and brought his own interpretation to the genre. He saw this as a way of showing mugham to a wider audience and making it relevant to contemporary society, saying, "The world in which we live changes daily. Music has to lend emotional expression to this vitality. I accommodate that by seeking out new paths and interpretations". Similarly he revolutionized the strict mugham instrumentation, introducing his own improvisation and including new sounds such as the double-reeded balaban (also known as a duduk), the clarinet and the nagara, a metal-bodied drum. Additionally, he remained conscious of the need to modernize when choosing his ensemble, mixing older, experienced players with younger, more dynamic musicians.

The 1990s saw Qasımov tour widely with concerts in Iran, Brazil, the United States and throughout Europe. His music gained more exposure in Europe and North America when a chance meeting with American musician Jeff Buckley at a classical music festival in France resulted in a collaboration. Buckley was a fan of Qasımov's music and they performed a duet of "What Will You Say" which featured on Buckley's Live à l'Olympia release. Buckley, an avid listener of Qawwali, was highly impressed with Qasımov's performance, noting: "he just came with his drum, and he sang, and it was so pure and effortless... That's what the voice is for". Qasımov was equally pleased with the collaboration, stating that his American counterpart "was very gifted and had a real feeling for Eastern people." The performance resulted in the introduction of Qasımov's music to a broader Western audience.

Revitalised by Azerbaijan's declaration of independence from the Soviet Union, the artistic importance of Azeri culture, including both Qasımov and mugham, began to be recognised internationally. Qasımov was named the "People's Artist of Azerbaijan" in 1993 and earned the highest honour in his field in 1999 when he won the International IMC-UNESCO Music Prize—an award given to high calibre musicians such as Dmitri Shostakovich, Leonard Bernstein, Ravi Shankar and Nusrat Fateh Ali Khan. Partly helped by Qasımov's extensive touring and promotion of mugham, UNESCO proclaimed the mugham of Azerbaijan a "Masterpiece of the Oral and Intangible Heritage of Humanity" in 2003, reassuring the preservation of a centuries-old classical tradition. Similarly, the preservation of Qasımov's own music was assured as he recorded and internationally released his music for the first time, beginning with Classical Mugham, a 1996 collaboration with the Mansurov brothers, and following with Azerbaijan: Art of the Mugham and Legendary Art of Mugham in 1998.

In 1999, Qasımov, with his daughter, participated in “The Spirit of the East” concert directed and composed by Israeli Mizrahi musician Peretz Eliyahu and Mark Eliyahu.

=== 2000 to present: Introducing Ferghana ===
"Bagishla mani"
from Love's Deep Ocean
Demonstrating the mugham style

Qasımov's daughter, Ferghana Qasımova, had been informally practising with her father since the age of sixteen and was an avid student of mugham. By the age of twenty she had become a fully-fledged singer in her own right and Qasımov chose to introduce his daughter into his ensemble. Ferghana first appeared on 1997's The Legendary Art of Mugham on which the two shared the vocal tasks on the song Getme Getme. Their next album included a track, Bagishlamani, dedicated to his forebear; Nusrat Fateh Ali Khan. The release marked a high point for Qasımov as it was his first widely available release to Western audiences, and it proved a critical success. His aim to reconnect younger generations with mugham began to pay dividends; not only was he appealing to traditional Islamic sections of the Azerbaijani population, but also to more Americanized and modern audiences. The breakthrough amongst the younger generations spurred him on: "Sometimes young people come up after a concert to thank me. That's like giving me wings. I feel so elated when I can awaken such feelings in people while they are still young; mugham is not an easy genre for young people to understand".

"Although I am her father, we have taken the journey in mugham together. Though I had begun earlier, it was with her birth that my own work became serious, or professional. Before then, I was just a playful young man in love with mugham.""

— Qasimov on his daughter, Ferghana Qasimova Interview with Al-Ahram Weekly

Qasımov recorded and released further works with The Art of Mugham in 1997 and Central Asian Series, Vol. 6: Spiritual Music of Azerbaijan in 2007. He took the opportunity to perform in New York City in 2005 as part of Yo-Yo Ma's Silk Road Project. The concert aimed to promote multi-cultural artistic exchange between eastern and western cultures, and The New York Times regarded Qasımov's performance, alongside Malik Mansurov and Rauf Islamov, as the highlight of the event. He toured throughout Europe, now bringing Ferghana along with him, and was in demand to appear at spiritual music festivals in countries such as France and Egypt. Their performances were often critically acclaimed, regardless of the location. Remarking upon a performance in London as part of "Voices of Central Asia", Michael Church stated in The Independent that "initial shock turned to delight as we were drawn into his intimate, multicoloured world". The father and daughter duo paid dividends and, following their performance in Cairo in May 2008, Al-Ahram Weekly stressed the qualities of their powerful vocal unity and stage presence, describing Qasımov as "a master of mugham".

Their brand of mugham proved equally popular the following September, performing a collaboration with experimental classical group the Kronos Quartet. Band leader David Harrington was keen to work with the Azerbaijani for the Ramadan Nights Festival, saying: "I realised his voice was as unique as Nusrat Fateh Ali Khan's, or the tenor John McCormack's in Irish ballads, or Bessie Smith's in St Louis Blues. There's a special quality to that voice, a connection between it and his inner life...he is up there in the top five of all time [singers]". Despite initial problems involving the Kronos Quartet's arrangements and Qasımov's improvisation, the event received positive reviews. Robin Denselow of The Guardian opined that Qasımov "is certainly one of the most thrilling, unashamedly emotional performers on the planet, and the finest exponent of mugham".

In 1995, Qasımov performed "What Will You Say" as a duet with Jeff Buckley at the Festival de la Musique Sacrée (Festival of Sacred Music) in France.

In 2014, Qasımov performed at the Festival Internacional Cervantino, the largest international festival in Latin America.

In 2015, Qasımov performed the opening act during the Opening Ceremony of the First European Games in Baku, as well as a further performance midway, singing from a flying carpet.

In 2026, Alim Qasımov and Fərqanə Qasımova's cover of Nelly Furtado's Say It Right was featured on the in-game radio of Rockstar Games' video game Grand Theft Auto VI.

== Influence and legacy ==
In 2009, he was included in a 500 most influential Muslims of world book. The Icelandic singer Björk complimented Qasımov, by naming him as her "favourite singer alive today". In 2009, Turkish newspaper Zaman named him as "Central Asia's Greatest Voice".

In 2010, Qasımov was nominated for the United States National Public Radio's "50 great voices in recorded history" award.

== Personal life ==
He teaches mugham at Asaf Zeynally Music School in Baku. In 2012, he campaigned to stop male violence against women.

== Discography ==
=== Albums ===
- Classical Mugham (1996)
- The Legendary Art of Mugham (1997) with Alim Qasımov Ensemble
- The Art of Mugham: Azerbaidjan (Live) (1997)
- The Mugham of Azerbaidjan (1999)
- Love's Deep Ocean (1999) with Farghana Qasımova
- Oyanish (2003) with Coldünya
- Central Asian Series, Vol. 6: Spiritual Music of Azerbaijan (2007) with Farghana Qasımova
- Intimate dialogue – live at Morgenland Festival Osnabrück 2009 with Farghana Qasımova
- Seven Beauties Music Project with Shoayb Shahabi (2018)
- Awakening (Buda Musique, 2019) with Michel Godard

=== As featured artist ===
Year	Title	Chart positions						Album
Year	Title	SPA	FRA	GER	BEL	UK	ITA	Album
2010	"I’m your Goddess" (David Vendetta feat. Tara McDonald and Alim Qasımov)	—	—	—	—	—	—	Vendetta
2015	"Gdybym" (Voo Voo feat. Alim Qasımov and Farghana Qasımova)	—	—	—	—	—	—	Dobry wieczór
2018	"Yol" (Vugarixx feat. Alim Qasımov	—	—	—	—	—	—	
