= Rena Gasimova =

Azerbaijani computer scientist

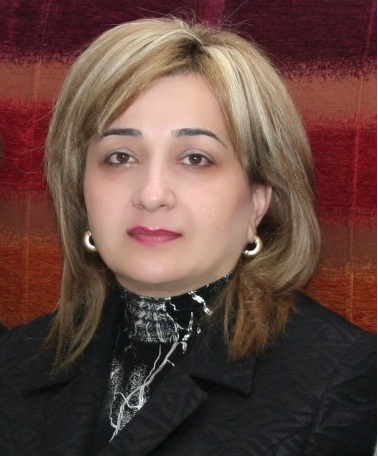
Gasimova Rana Tofiq

Rena Tofiq Gasimova (born 1961) is an Azerbaijani computer scientist, who holds the position of Sector Chief at the national Information Technology Institute (AMEA İnformasiya Texnologiyaları İnstitutu).

== Career ==
Gasimova graduated in 1985 from the Faculty of Automatics and Computer Science, Azerbaijan Polytechnic Institute named after Ch. Ildirim.

From 1985 until her present appointment she worked for the ACS Department of Azerbaijan Academy of Sciences. She worked to develop systems for various purposes, such as a database management system "The Court of Auditors, the corporate information system "Personnel". She took part in the creation of the www.science.az portal of ANAS. She carried out research on the implementation of technology in Azerbaijan, carrying out maintenance and analysis of multidimensional databases to support decision-making. She also involved in the study of methods and algorithms for control and learning (data mining) in corporate network environment, and investigated methods of analysis of aggregate data in operational systems, analytical processing (OLAP - On-Line Analytical Processing), based on a large distributed information resources. Currently she is engaged in investigating the issues of forming a knowledge base of domain names related to interests of the Republic of Azerbaijan. She is the author of more than 38 scientific papers, 28 of them published in scientific publications.

She is engaged in training activities in the Training Innovation Center of the Information Technology Institute, and she currently holds the post of Sector Chief at the institute.
