= Nariman Isayev =

Minister of Construction Materials Industry of the Azerbaijan SSR

Nariman Isayev Nəriman İsayev

Minister of Construction Materials Industry of the Azerbaijan SSR
- In office 1976 – February 3, 1981
- Succeeded by: Ramiz Sadigov

Deputy Minister of Construction and Operation of Highways of the Azerbaijan SSR
- In office 1981–1986

Personal details
- Born: July 27, 1930 Baku, Azerbaijan SSR, Soviet Union
- Died: June 10, 1988 (aged 57)
- Party: CPSU
- Education: Azerbaijan Industrial Institute
- Awards: Honored Builder of the Azerbaijan SSR Order of the Red Banner of Labour
- Website: isayevler.biz

Nariman Aghakhan oglu Isayev (Azerbaijani: Nəriman Ağaxan oğlu İsayev, July 27, 1930 — June 10, 1988) was an Azerbaijani-Soviet engineer and statesman, Minister of Construction Materials Industry of the Azerbaijan SSR.

== Biography ==
Nariman Isayev was born on July 27, 1930, in Baku. After graduating from the Azerbaijan Industrial Institute in 1951, he worked in a number of engineering positions. In 1953–1960, he was a junior researcher at the State Institute of Offshore Installation Design, senior electrical engineer of the Azerbaijan Offshore Oil Facilities Construction Trust, director of the plant of reinforced concrete products. In 1961-1969 he worked as the head of "Azerkommunalenerji", "Azerelektroqurashdirma", "Azersenayeelektroqurashdirma" trusts, the first deputy of the Main Gas Economy Department.

From 1969 he worked as the head of the Department of Installation and Special Construction of the Council of Ministers of the Azerbaijan SSR, the Minister of Construction Materials Industry of the Azerbaijan SSR from 1976, the Deputy Minister of Construction and Operation of Highways of the Azerbaijan SSR from 1981 to 1986, the Head of the "Azerborukemertikinti" Trust of the USSR Ministry of Oil and Gas Industry Construction. In 1986, he was appointed director of the Baku City Electrical Grid and worked there until the last days of his life.

Nariman Isayev had been a member of the CPSU since 1955, a deputy of the Supreme Soviet of the Azerbaijan SSR of the VIII, IX and X convocations, a member of the inspection commission of the Central Committee of the Azerbaijan Communist Party at the XXVIII and XXIX congresses. He died on June 10, 1988.

== Awards ==
- Honored Builder of the Azerbaijan SSR
- Order of the Red Banner of Labour (2)
- Honorary decrees of the Presidium of the Supreme Soviet of the Azerbaijan SSR
