= Ramin Mazaheri =

Iranian audio engineer and music producer

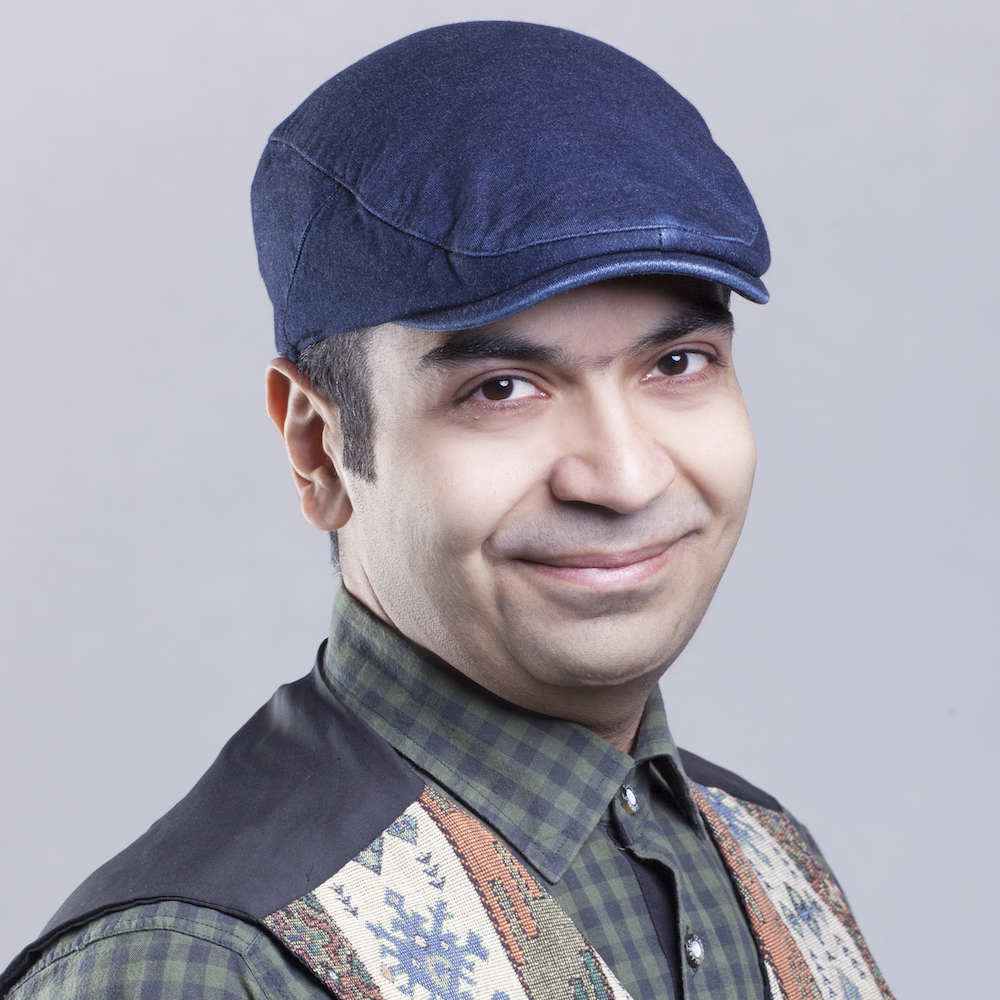
- Ramin Mazaheri in 2016

Background information
- Born: 21 April 1983 (age 43); Isfahan, Iran
- Occupations: Audio Engineer, Music Producer
- Instruments: Guitar, Piano
- Years active: 2001–present
- Website: raminmazaheri.com

Ramin Mazaheri (Persian: رامین مظاهری; born 21 April 1983) is an Iranian audio engineer, music producer, and musician.

He has been cooperating, as an engineer, in the production of several significant albums, such as Aah-Baran (Mohammad-Reza Shajarian), Pieces from Iranian Composers (Tehran Symphonic Orchestra) Mian-e Khorshidha-ye Hamisheh (Rastak Ensemble), To Life (Minus1), Rebel (Kourosh Yaghmaei); and some popular TV series, including Mokhtarnameh, Shahrzad, Mehmooni 1 & 2 and Shookhi Kardam; He also has produced several tracks for some Iranian singers such as Mazyar Fallahi and Ehsan Haghshenas.

== Career ==
His career as an engineer started with accepting orders at his home studio in 2001, which he developed gradually. It was after he met Raymond Movsessian, a Professional audio engineer, who guided Ramin on professional levels, that he managed to establish Baran Studio in 2005.

In 2005, he was more productive in recording successful music Albums, In the same year he accepted to work with Raymond Movsessian, as an engineer assistant, at Mohammad Reza Shajarian Concert; He also recorded Naghsh e Khial, an Album by Ali Ghamsarai with Homayoon Shajarian as a vocalist; At the same time he was cooperating with some musicians like Mehdi Moghadam, Nariman, Amir yal Arjomand, Mani Rahnama, etc.

Baran Studio was transferred to a bigger place in 2010. Around this time Ramin cooperated with Mehran Modiri at Shookhi Kardam Series. He recorded an album alongside Mehdi Paknejad (Setar Player) and Farhad Asadi (Tombak player) in 2011, which was released without any editing or mixing, so they decided to call it "Senavazi" ("Trio"). Shortly after that, they performed these pieces in Roudaki Hall. This was the first time that a sound engineer attended on the stage alongside the instrumentalists and microphones placement and soundcheck in front of the live studio audience.

He has worked in his career with many well-known artists and musicians such as Mohammad-Reza Shajarian, Kayhan Kalhor, Alexander Rahbari, The Kamkars, Shahram Nazeri, Kourosh Yaghmaei, Kaveh Yaghmaei, Aref (singer), Martik, Behrouz Gharibpour, Mehdi Bagheri, Salar Aghili, Homayoun Shajarian, Kaveh Sarvarian, Hamzeh Yeganeh, Rastak Ensemble, Minus 1, Mohsen Namjoo, Hamed Behdad, Mehran Modiri, Ajam (band), Reza Yazdani (singer), Mehdi Moghadam, Mazyar Fallahi, Amir Tavassoli, Farzin Gharahgozloo, Mohammad Reza Jadidi, Mohammad Esfahani, Alireza Assar, Behrouz Saffarian, Masoud Fayyaz Zadeh, etc.

Reza Abedyan, kamancheh player, in his interview with Melody Magazine, has said: "I felt so much happiness when I heard that for the first time a sound engineer attended on the stage alongside instrumentalists. Because it seems to me that this career always has been ignored by people".

Siamak Gholizadeh, in Etemad News has said: "Of course, the interesting and brilliant mix of Ramin Mazaheri cannot be ignored. The combination of electronic and rock music has rarely happened in Iran before, and this is the band (Baadzang) trump card in creating a new sound."

In 2017 he performed in 32nd Fajr International Music Festival, Research Section, on the "Sound, Recording and Accessories" topic. Also, "Kahgel" the album by Hamzeh Yeganeh, with his mixing and mastering, won the Barbad Award for the best Fusion album at that Festival. In 2019 he was Judge (Jury) on Naser Farhoudi Award.

He produced video series as known as "The Sound of Music by Ramin Mazaheri" about how to record Iranian instruments.

== Teaching and New Ventures ==
From 2016 to 2023, Ramin Mazaheri taught sound engineering and mixing at several universities in Iran, sharing his knowledge and experience with the next generation of audio professionals.

In 2023, he founded Baran Sound Lab Inc. in Toronto, Canada, expanding his influence and expertise into the international arena. Baran Sound Lab Inc. focuses on innovative audio engineering solutions and music production, continuing the legacy of excellence established by Baran Studio in Iran.

== Discography ==
=== As engineer (music) ===
Year	Album title	Artist	Producer	As Engineer
2025	The Confidant	Milad Bagheri	Milad Bagheri & Homa Samiee	Recording, Mixing, Mastering
2024	Carvansarai	Mehdi Bagheri & Kourosh Moradi	Mehdi Bagheri & Kourosh Moradi	Mixing, Mastering
2024	Oula	Mohsen Namjoo	Mohsen Namjoo	Recording, Mixing, Mastering
2024	Rebel	Kourosh Yaghmaei	Kourosh Yaghmaei	Mixing, Mastering
2023	Restless	Mohsen Namjoo	Mohsen Namjoo & Ali Jaferi	Mixing, Mastering
2023	Night Shift	Amirhosein Shoorcheh	Masoud Fayyaz Zadeh	Recording, Mixing, Mastering
2023	In The Nearest Faraway	Mehdi Bagheri	Mehdi Bagheri	Mixing, Mastering
2022	Odd Time Rock	Mohsen Namjoo	Mohsen Namjoo & Masoud Fayyaz Zadeh	Recording, Mixing, Mastering
2022	Confessions	Raha Project	Farshid Salarzaie	Mixing, Mastering
2022	In The Face Of Gravity	Mehdi Bagheri & Greg Ellis (musician)	Mehdi Bagheri & Greg Ellis (musician)	Mixing, Mastering
2022	They Sing Sagas of My Death	Crows in the Rain	Crows in the Rain	Recording, Mixing, Mastering
2021	Ba To Mimunam	Kajcool	Kajcool	Mixing, Mastering
2021	Khorshid-e Siah (Black Sun)	Siamak Baghdadi	Kaveh Yaghmaei	Recording, Mixing, Mastering
2021	Hezar Hich	Hamed Behdad	Masoud Fayyaz Zadeh	Recording, Mixing, Mastering
2020	You Walked with Me Then, Before Night or Day	Crows in the Rain	Crows in the Rain	Mixing, Mastering
2020	Raaz-o Niyaz	Faramarz Payvar	Ali Samadpour	Recording, Mixing, Mastering
2020	Hengam-e Mey	Faramarz Payvar	Ali Samadpour	Recording, Mixing, Mastering
2020	M&M, The Afro-Persian Experience	Mehdi Bagheri & Marcus L. Miller	Mehdi Bagheri & Marcus L. Miller	Mixing, Mastering
2020	dri:m wan; därk blü	Crows in the Rain	Crows in the Rain	Recording, Mixing, Mastering
2019	Maria, at Four	Babak Valipour	Babak Valipour	Recording, Mixing, Mastering
2019	Didar Studio	Talk Show	Cafe Bazar	Recording, Mixing, Mastering
2019	Sepand-e Soukhteh	Saeed Hakimzadeh	Navid Ghazvineh	Mixing, Mastering
2019	Sorrow For An Unfinished Dream	Crows in the Rain	Crows in the Rain	Recording, Mixing, Mastering
2018	Khalvatgah-e Man	Mohammad Zaker Hosein	Masoud Shenasa	Recording, Mixing, Mastering
2018	Bahar	Rastak Ensemble	Rastak Ensemble	Mixing, Mastering
2018	Escape Artist	Amir Khaki	Amir Khaki	Recording
2018	Ashes Of The Past	Crows in the Rain	Crows in the Rain	Recording, Mixing, Mastering
2018	Radio Delta - Live in Niavaran (Audio CD & DVD)	Mohammad Reza Saboktakin & Radio Delta	Mohammad Reza Saboktakin	Recording, Mixing, Mastering
2018	Piano Works - Scriabin	Ali Yeganeh	Ali Yeganeh	Mixing, Mastering
2018	Partitas For Violin - Bach	Afshin Zaker	Afshin Zaker	Recording, Mixing, Mastering
2018	To Life (Baraye Zendegi)	Minus 1	Minus 1	Recording, Mixing, Mastering
2018	Silent Valley	Baadzang	Alireza Ahmadzadeh – Masoud Fayyaz Zadeh	Recording, Mixing, Mastering
2017	No Doubt Love	Farshid Kashani	Masoud Fayyaz Zadeh	Recording, Mixing, Mastering
2017	Sargozasht	Masoud Shenassa	Masoud Shenassa	Recording, Mixing, Mastering
2017	A New Dawn (Tolooee Digar)	Arman Nahrvar	Arman Nahrvar	Mixing, Mastering
2017	Little Girl And Lost Blossom	Crows in the Rain	Crows in the Rain	Recording, Mixing, Mastering
2017	Change The World	Vaak Band	Vaak Band	Recording, Mixing, Mastering
2016	Among Eternal Suns	Rastak Ensemble	Rastak Ensemble	Mixing, Mastering
2016	Kahgel	Hamzeh Yaganeh	Hamzeh Yeganeh	Mixing, Mastering
2016	Percussion Planes	Farhad Asadi – Morteza Aghabagheri	Farhad Asadi – Morteza Aghabagheri	Recording, Mixing, Mastering
2016	Roots and Veins (Rag O Risheh)	Ajam (band)	Ajam (band)	Mastering
2016	Incomplete World	BaadZang	Alireza Ahmadzadeh – Masoud Fayyaz Zadeh	Mixing, Mastering
2015	Serre Hezar Saleh	Salar Aghili	Keyvan Kianian	Recording, Mixing, Mastering
2015	The First	Sahand Athari	Sahand Athari – Keyvan Tafti	Recording, Mixing, Mastering
2015	Science of Rain	Minus 1	Minus 1	Recording, Mixing, Mastering
2015	Darkness	Hadi Pakzad	Hadi Pakzad – Masoud Fayyaz Zadeh	Recording, Mixing, Mastering
2015	Ye Ettefagh	Reza Ettefagh	Pooria Ahmadi	Recording, Mixing, Mastering
2015	Nokoob	Daarkoob	Daarkoob	Siah-e Zangi (Track) Recording
2014	Va Angah... Senavazi	Mehdi Paknejad – Farhad Asadi	Mehdi Paknejad - Farhad Asadi - Ramin Mazaheri	Recording, Mastering
2014	Hasti?	Sattar Salehi	Sattar Salehi	Recording, Mixing, Mastering
2013	In Faraway Clouds	Mehdi Bagheri	Mehdi Bagheri	Recording, Mixing, Mastering
2013	The Guitar and Hungry Cat	Carina Kimiaei	Carina Kimiaei	Recording, Mixing, Mastering
2013	Imagine	Yasser Davoudian	Behrouz Saffarian	Recording, Mixing, Mastering
2012	Aseman, Mahtab	Hadi Feyz Abadi	Kaveh Sarvarian	Recording, Mixing, Mastering
2012	Parisan	Kaveh Sarvarian	Kaveh Sarvarian	Recording, Mixing, Mastering
2012	20 Shahrivar	Ali Shokat	Ali Shokat	Mixing, Mastering
2011	Crimson Moon	Moreza	Moreza	Recording, Mixing, Mastering
2011	Persian Rug	Hamzeh Yeganeh – Kaveh Sarvarian	Hamzeh Yeganeh – Kaveh Sarvarian	Mixing, Mastering
2010	Singles	Mohammad Mobini	Behrouz Pazireh	Recording, Mixing, Mastering
2010	Pas To Budi	-	Ahmadreza Azizi	Mixing, Mastering
2010	Zoljanah Miayad	Rasoul Najafian	Rasoul Najafian	Mixing, Mastering
2010	Asheghetam	Mohammad Mobini	Behrouz Pazireh	Recording, Mixing, Mastering
2009	Avareh	Hamzeh Yeganeh	Hamzeh Yeganeh	Recording, Mixing, Mastering
2009	Naima (Live in Arasbaran)	Naima	Hamzeh Yeganeh – Kaveh Sarvarian	Recording, Mixing, Mastering
2008	Aah, Baran	Mohammad-Reza Shajarian	Mazda Ansari	Mixing, Mastering
2007	Naghshe Khial	Homayoun Shajarian	Ali Ghamsari	Recording
2006	First Appearance	Hamed Hafez	Payam Shams	Recording

=== As engineer (soundtrack - score) ===
Year	Film title	Composer	Director	As Engineer
2023	Mehmooni 2 (The Party II)	Amir Tavassoli	Iraj Tahmasb	Recording
2022	Mehmooni 1 (The Party I)	Amir Tavassoli	Iraj Tahmasb	Recording
2019	The Singer (Motreb)	Arman Mousapour - Parviz Parastui	Mostafa Kiaei	Recording
2019	The Monster (TV series) (Hayoula)	Amir Tavassoli	Mehran Modiri	Recording
2019	Shahrzad (TV series)	Amir Tavassoli	Hassan Fathi	Recording
2016	Poshtebaam-e Tehran (TV series)	Farzin Gharahgozloo - Reza Sadeghi	Behrang Tofighi	Recording, Mixing, Mastering
2013	Autumn Evening (TV series)	Farzin Gharahgozloo	Asghar Naeimi	Recording, Mixing, Mastering
2013	I'm just kidding (TV series)	Farhad Modiri	Mehran Modiri	Recording, Mixing, Mastering
2012	Eve's Daughters (TV series)	Farzin Gharahgozloo	Hossein Soheili Zadeh	Recording, Mixing, Mastering
2012	Sad Saal Be In Salha (Miss Iran)	Amir Tavassoli	Saman Moghadam	Recording, Mixing, Mastering
2012	Immortality (TV series)	Mazyar Fallahi	Akbar Mansour Fallah	Recording, Mixing, Mastering
2011	No Men Allowed	Heydar Sajedi	Rambod Javan	Recording, Mixing, Mastering
2011	Parvanegi	Mazyar Fallahi	Ghasem Jafari	Recording, Mixing, Mastering
2011	Frozen Heart (Ghalbe Yakhi) S2 (TV series)	Mazyar Fallahi	Mohammad Hossein Latifi	Recording, Mixing, Mastering
2010	Frozen Heart (Ghalbe Yakhi) S1 (TV series)	Mazyar Fallahi	Mohammad Hossein Latifi	Recording, Mixing, Mastering
2010	Mokhtarnameh (TV series)	Amir Tavassoli	Davood Mir-Bagheri	Recording, Mixing, Mastering
2010	Poopak & Mash Mashallah	Heydar Sajedi	Farzad Motamen	Recording, Mixing, Mastering
2009	Shamsol Emareh (TV series)	Amir Tavassoli	Saman Moghadam	Recording, Mixing, Mastering
2009	Deportees 2	Amir Tavassoli	Masoud Dehnamaki	Recording, Mixing, Mastering
2008	Majnoone Leyli	Mazyar Fallahi - Payam Shams	Ghasem Jafari	Recording, Mixing, Mastering
2008	Women Are Angels	Amir Tavassoli	Shahram Shah Hosseini	Recording, Mixing, Mastering
2007	The Boss	Farzin Gharahgozloo	Masoud Kimiai	Mixing, Mastering
2007	The Trial	Amir Tavassoli	Iraj Ghaderi	Recording, Mixing, Mastering
2007	A Hat For Baran	Amir Tavassoli	Masoud Navabi	Recording, Mixing, Mastering
2007	Dar Shahr Khabari Nist, Hast	Farzin Gharahgozloo	Reza Khatibi	Recording, Mixing, Mastering
2007	Kalagh Par	Amir Tavassoli	Shahram Shah Hosseini	Recording, Mixing, Mastering
2006	Half Mine, Half Yours	Amir Tavassoli	Vahid Nikkhah Azad	Recording, Mixing, Mastering

=== As producer ===
Track name	Artist	Album
10:30	Mazyar Fallahi	Ghlbe Yakhi
Adamakaye Barfi	Mazyar Fallahi	Ghalbe Yakhi 2 (Sound Track)
Lahzeha	Mazyar Fallahi	Khass
Nemidooni	Ehsan Haghshenas	Tik Tik
