= Zarbofoot =

Iranian band

Zarbofoot ضرب و فوت
- Origin: Tehran, Iran
- Genres: Persian pop; Persian rock; Persian jazz; R&B; electropop
- Instruments: Brass instrument; Saxophone; Clarinet; Piano; Keyboards; Electronic instruments; Percussion
- Years active: 2018–present
- Labels: Radio Javan (Internet); Avaye Barbod; Avaye Honar
- Members: Dariush Salehpur; Alireza Miragha; Soroush Omoumi; Amir Mohammadi
- Website: www.zarbofoot.com

Zarbofoot (Persian: ضرب و فوت, also Romanized as "Zarb-o-Foot" or "Zarb-o-Fūt", Persian pronunciation: [zæɾboˈfu:t]) is an Iranian musical band who has been active since 2017.

== Professional activity ==
Zarbofoot was formed by Dariush Salehpour and Amir Mohammadi in the spring of 2017 and was joined later by the other members, including Reza Tajbakhsh. The band comprises a spectrum of wind instruments and electronic music with a touch of jazz and impromptu performance. The themes of the band's music are mostly worldwide and social. Zarbofoot gave its debut concert on 1 December 2018, at Niavaran Cultural House, on the occasion of World AIDS Day with the collaboration of the United Nations and UNAIDS in Iran, which was an electrojazz performance.

=== Band's name ===
The name "Zarbofoot" (zarb + -o- + foot) is in fact an exaggerated Persian equivalent for the English words, "saxophone" and "beat".

=== Members ===
Zarbofoot has five main players:

- Dariush Salehpur (b. 1980), electronic instruments
- Reza Tajbakhsh (b. 1981), piano
- Alireza Miragha (b. 1979), trumpet
- Soroush Omoumi (b. 1988), flute and percussion
- Amir Mohammadi (b. 1986), saxophone and clarinet

=== Collaborations ===
The band has collaborated with some famous singers, among them: Salar Aghili, Mohsen Yeganeh, Homayoun Shajarian, Farzad Farzin, and Benyamin Bahadori.

== Works ==
- Plastic Garden (Album), released 14 November 2019
- "Walking in the Rain", electrojazz, 2017
- "Plastic garden", electrojazz, 2018

The album and both songs' composer, arranger, and mixer are Dariush Salehpour.

== See also ==
- Dariush Salehpour
