= Taghdir =

Studio album by Shadmehr Aghili
- Released: 2009
- Genre: pop
- Length: 27:06
- Label: Santori Records
- Producer: Shadmehr Aghili

Shadmehr Aghili chronology
PopCorn (2005)	Taghdir (2009)	Tarafdaar (2012)

Taghdir is a studio album by Shadmehr Aghili released in 2009 by Century Records. All songwriter and Producer by Shadmehr Aghili

== Track list ==
No.	Title	Writer(s)	Producer(s)	Length
1.	"Taghdir"	Shadmehr Aghili	Shadmehr Aghili	4:40
2.	"Khial"	Shadmehr Aghili	Shadmehr Aghili	3:12
3.	"Mashkook"	Greece Music	Shadmehr Aghili	3:11
4.	"ُShilla"	Shadmehr Aghili	Shadmehr Aghili	2:29
5.	"Tars"	Shadmehr Aghili	Shadmehr Aghili, Mehran Jamali Rad	4:25
6.	"Residi"	Shadmehr Aghili	Shadmehr Aghili	3:55
7.	"Ye Kari Kon"	Shadmehr Aghili	Shadmehr Aghili	3:21
8.	"Sabab"	Shadmehr Aghili	Shadmehr Aghili	3:13

== Notes ==
- The song Taghdir was ranked 20th in the Manoto 1 TV station’s selection.
- Mashkook, Residi, Ye kari kon and Sabab in the Title of Unofficial album(Sabab) was released, Then republished on this title Officially

== Sources ==
- Shadmehr Aghili Website
