= Soroush =

Soroush (Persian: سروش), is an Iranian name, originating from the Zoroastrian divinity Soroush, and may refer to:

First name

- Soroush Ahmadi, Iranian taekwondo competitor
- Soroush Omoumi, Iranian musician
- Soroush Rafiei, Iranian footballer
- Soroush Saeidi, Iranian footballer
- Soroush Sehhat, Iranian director, screenwriter and actor

Last name

- Abdolkarim Soroush, Iranian philosopher and writer
- Abolfazl Soroush, Iranian physician and reformist politician
- Bahram Soroush, Iranian activist
- Tajuden Soroush, Afghan journalist

Others

- Soroush, publishing center of the Islamic Republic of Iran Broadcasting (IRIB)
- Soroush Plus, Iranian instant messaging application
- Soroush Cinema (formerly known as "Moulin Rouge Cinema"), a cinema in Tehran, Iran
- Soroush, the name of angel Gabriel in Persian literature, referred to as the "Angel of Conscience" or "Voice of Conscience"
- Soroush is the Persian name of Capella, the brightest star in the northern constellation of Auriga
