= Dehati =

Dehati may refer to:

- the name of a dialect of Maithili, Awadhi and possibly other languages of India
- a composition by Indian musician Ravi Shankar
- Dehati (Shadmehr Aghili album), album by the Iranian musician
