= Behrouz Saffarian =

Iranian music composer

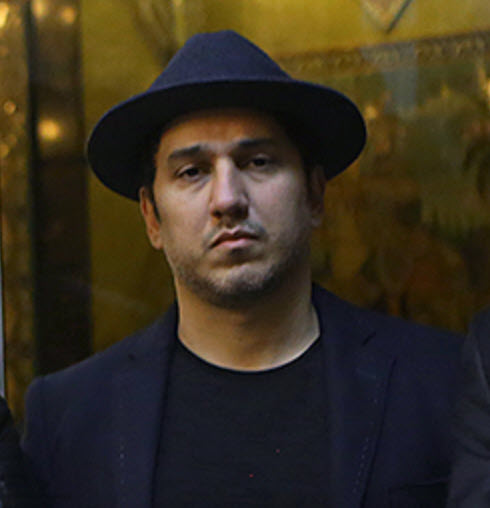
- Behrouz Safarian at the funeral ceremony of Mohsen Chavoshi's father, 2022
- Born: February 13, 1978 (age 48); Iran
- Occupations: composer; arranger
- Awards: Barbad Award for Best Music Album of the Year - 2015
- Musical career
- Genres: Persian Pop
- Instruments: Vocals; guitar; piano; keyboard
- Years active: 1998–present

Behrouz Saffarian (Persian: بهروز صفاریان; born February 13, 1978) is an Iranian composer, arranger, and producer. Saffarian was named in the top ten in both the composer and arranger sections in the poll of the best Iranian pop music of 2012 by Taranehmah magazine. Saffarian career dates back to 1997.

== Biography ==
Behrouz Saffarian was born on February 13, 1978. He is the youngest of four children. He has two brothers and a sister. His parents worked at the post office. Behrouz started playing the instrument for the first time at five and used the citadel of his brother, Behzad. His family did not allow him to play music as a child not to jeopardize his educational status. He was supposed to be sent a keyboard from Germany when he was 11 years old, but the customs officials of Mehrabad airport refused to deliver it to the Saffarian family. Guidance officials did not cooperate to clear this keyboard and Behrooz's dream instrument was returned to Germany. Finally, at the age of 13, he got a keyboard. He borrowed instruments from people with more advanced keyboards and made rhythms for them, and although he did not receive a salary, he was satisfied that he had access to new instruments. After middle school, he went to Bargh Conservatory, and after a few months, he achieved his dream and graduated from the music conservatory.

== Conductor ==
Behrouz Saffarian, conductor of Fereydoun Foroughi, Mohammad Esfahani and Ali Lohrasbi have been in charge for some time. He has announced that he does not intend to go on stage at the moment as the conductor of the orchestra, and for the last time, he officially appeared on the stage at our music festival and took the piece of Bagh-e-Raz alley to the stage.

== Artistic collaboration with singers ==
Among the singers that Behrouz Saffarian has collaborated with as a composer or arranger are Dariush Eghbali, Ghasem Afshar, Khashayar Etemadi, Shadmehr Aghili, Mohammad Esfahani, Ehsan Khajeh Amiri, Roozbeh Bemani, Fereydoon Asraei, Ali Lohrasbi, Mohsen Chavoshi, Reza Sadeghi, Mohsen Yeganeh, Mehrzad Isfahanpour and Mohammad Khakpour.

== Awards ==
- Barbad Award for Best Music Album of the Year - 2015
