= Dariush Salehpour =

Dariush Salehpour داریوش صالح‌پور
- Born: Mohsen Salehpour; March 25, 1980 (age 46)
- Origin: Tehran, Iran
- Genres: Persian pop; Persian jazz; Rock; Electronic music; Electropop; Persian R&B
- Occupations: composer, songwriter
- Instruments: piano; keyboards; guitar
- Years active: 1995–present
- Labels: Exir-e Novin; Sedāgostar; Tasvirgostar-e Pāsārgād; Āvā-ye Neylabak-e Sharghi; Music-e Mā; Āvā-ye Bārbad
- Website: dariushsalehpour.ir

Dariush Salehpour (Persian: داریوش صالح‌پور, also Romanized as Dāriūsh Sālehpūr, Persian pronunciation: [dɒːɾˈjuːʃ sɒːlehˈpuːɾ]; born 1980 in Tehran), né Mohsen Salehpour (محسن صالح‌پور), is an Iranian composer, pianist, keyboardist, guitarist, and arranger. He is the creator and leader of the electronic jazz band “Zarbofoot” (which means “beat and blow” in Persian).

Salehpour is a graduate in computer software from Azad University. He spontaneously started playing the keyboard and the piano when he was only six years old. His talent was discovered by Arman Nahrvar in 1995, during a little performance at the Faculty of Economics in Allameh Tabatabai University, which marked his career. Next year Mohsen learned how to play the guitar and then he took up the electric guitar. In 1999 Salehpour and two friends of his, namely Sohrab Ramezanzadeh and Kaveh Ramezanzadeh, formed a rock band named “Piccolo” who, accompanied by Sara Naini, made performances in Tehran. It was about that time that Salehpour made friends with Reza Tajbakhsh and Alireza Miraqa. In 2001 the first piece arranged by Salehpour for Ruzbeh Nematollahi named “If You Were Not” was formally released.

Since then he has been seriously busy arranging and composing, producing many works in pop, electronic, and rock genres.

Dariush Salehpour has also worked as a guitarist and electronic artist with Shahram Shokoohi's orchestra. He had also a close relationship with Nima Varasteh as a partner.

Salehpour has a mixing and mastering (sound techniques) degree from the Australian company of “Vivid Sounds”.

During the COVID-19 pandemic, Dariush Salehpour and Reza Tajbakhsh (Iranian singer), replayed and performed the musical piece "Way To Fall" along with James Walsh, the singer of the English Post-Britpop rock band, Starsailor, which attracted the attention of the band's fans.

== Works ==
=== Album ===
- Plastic Garden, released 14 November 2019

=== Singles ===
- Some of Salehpour's singles are as follow:

Title	Singer	Poet/ Songwriter	Composer	Music arranger	Mixing	Genre	Publishing year
Bezar dastato too dastam	Behdad Sabouri, Maryam Mofid	Behdad Sabouri	Keymaro	Dariush Salehpour	Armin Karbaf	pop	2007
To Kodoom-i album	Mehdi Amini	Dariush Salehpour	Dariush Salehpour	Dariush Salehpour	Armin Karbaf	electronic pop	2007
Tanham nazar	Sasan Abedi	Dariush Salehpour	Dariush Salehpour	Dariush Salehpour	Dariush Salehpour	rock	2009
Age nabashi Amoo Zanjirbaf album	Rouzbeh Nematollahi	Shaya Geravand	Rouzbeh Nematollahi	Dariush Salehpour	Arash Pakzad	pop-rock	2009
Harf-e tazeh	Saman Abedi	Saman Abedi	Saman Abedi	Dariush Salehpour	Dariush Salehpour	fusion rock	2010
Mordad	Saman Abedi	Shaya Geravand	Saman Abedi	Dariush Salehpour	Dariush Salehpour	rock	2010
Khabari nist	Sohrab Pakzad	Sohrab Pakzad	Sohrab Pakzad	Dariush Salehpour (remix)	Dariush Salehpour	electronic	2011
Eshgh	Saman Abedi	Saman Abedi	Saman Abedi	Dariush Salehpour	Dariush Salehpour	rock	2011
To ro mibakhsham	Sohran Pakzad	Ali Ilia	Dariush Salehpour	Dariush Salehpour	Nima Varasteh	electronic	2012
Hes	Payam Salehi	Sohrab Pakzad	Sohrab Pakzad	Dariush Salehpour (remix)	Dariush Salehpour	electronic	2012
Aroom-aroom	Sohrab Pakzad	Sohrab Pakzad	Sohrab Pakzad	Dariush Salehpour	Dariush Salehpour	pop	2013
Khoda-negahdar; Darvag album	Rouzbeh Nematollahi	Hosein Ghiasi	Rouzbeh Nematollahi	Dariush Salehpour	Arash Pakzad	pop	2013
Shahr-e bi aberou	Farshin Tahmaseb	Alireza Azar	Dariush Salehpour	Dariush Salehpour	Dariush Salehpour	electronic	2014
Afsous	Hamidreza Hoseinkhani	Hamidreza Nasrollahi	Dariush Salehpour	Dariush Salehpour	Dariush Salehpour	electronic	2015
Takhribchi	Sadegh Ahangaran	Mehdi Zangeneh	Mehdi Zangeneh	Dariush Salehpour	Dariush Salehpour	epic	2015
Eshgh ya'ni	Fereydoun Asraei	Soroush Samiei	Fereydoun Asraei	Dariush Salehpour (remix)	Dariush Salehpour	electronic	2015
Vahm-e motlagh	Reza Tabatabaei	Ali Ilia	Dariush Salehpour	Dariush Salehpour	Dariush Salehpour	electronic	2015
Ye negah	Ali Behrouzi	Ali Ilia	Sohrab Pakzad	Dariush Salehpour	Dariush Salehpour	pop	2015
Hess-e ajib	Farzad Dazdameh	Hamidreza Nasrollahi	Dariush Salehpour	Dariush Salehpour	Dariush Salehpour	electronic	2016
Zemestoun	Hamid Hami	Babak Sahraei	Hamid Hami	Dariush Salehpour, Reza Tajbakhsh	Arash Pakzad	electronic pop	2016
Adat	Shahriar Masrour	Shahriar Masrour	Shahriar Masrour	Dariush Salehpour	Dariush Salehpour	rock	2016
Eshgh-o adat	Behdad Pasha	Behdad Pasha	Dariush Salehpour	Dariush Salehpour	Dariush Salehpour	electronic	2016
Vaght-e asheghi	Farzad Dazdameh	Milad Etna	Dariush Salehpour	Dariush Salehpour	Dariush Salehpour	pop	2016
Heleh	Hadi Feizabadi	Rumi	Dariush Salehpour	Dariush Salehpour	Mohammad Fallahi	electronic	2016
Rou-ye abrha	Amir Tabari	Amir Tabari	Amir Tabari	Dariush Salehpour	Dariush Salehpour	electronic	2017
Koudaki	Farshin Tahmaseb	Shadi Nazarpour	Farshin Tahmaseb	Dariush Salehpour	Dariush Salehpour	pop, jazz	2017
Majnoun-e tanha	Shahram Shokouhi	Shahram Shokouhi	Shahram Shokouhi	Dariush Salehpour	Mohammad Fallahi	pop	2017
Nakhordeh mey	Keivan Mirzazadeh (Lachin)	Fatemeh Arami	Iranian folk music	Dariush Salehpour	Dariush Salehpour	rock fusion	2017
Nime-ye gomshodeh	Decor Band (Kazemi Brothers)	Amir Pirnahan	Dariush Salehpour	Ashkan Mohammadian	Ehsan Javadi	electronic	2017
Hal-e khoda	Amir Tabari	Amir Tabari	Amir Tabari	Dariush Salehpour	Dariush Salehpour	pop	2018
Jan-o jahan	Foad Elahi Ghomshei	Rumi	Foad Elahi Ghomshei	Dariush Salehpour	Dariush Salehpour	electronic rock	2019

== See also ==
- Zarbofoot
