= Soroush Omoumi =

Soroush Omoumi سروش عمومی
- Born: February 7, 1988 (age 38); Tehran, Iran
- Origin: Iran
- Genres: Jazz fusion; Iranian pop; Iranian rock
- Occupations: Arranger; music producer
- Instruments: Flute; drums; percussion
- Years active: 1989–present
- Label: Now Khosravani Barbod
- Website: www.sorousho.com

Soroush Omoumi (Persian: سروش عمومی, romanized: Sorūsh Omūmī, Persian pronunciation: [soˈɾuːʃ omuːˈmiː]; born 1988 in Tehran), is an Iranian flutist, drummer, percussionist, arranger, and composer.

== Biography and career ==
Soroush Omoumi was born on 7 February 1988 in Tehran. Since his father was an aspiring musician, Soroush got interested in music as a child, beginning with drums and percussion. Being talented in rhythm and music in general, Soroush spent his childhood learning how to play instruments, mostly self-taught and occasionally helped by his father.

Encouraged by his family, he entered Tehran Music School at the age of twelve, where the flute was assigned his specialized instrument, and he began learning how to play it under the instruction of Mohammad-Ali Legha (محمدعلی لقاء).

Being instructed by the Music School's masters for six years, Soroush proved one of the best players, finishing the first several times in competitions. He took part in several contests and festivals, including Fajr International Music Festival, National Festival of Youth Music, and Municipality Music Festival, often getting first or second places.

Also keenly interested in playing instruments other than the flute, while studying at the Music School, Soroush took lessons in playing drums under the instruction of Houman Ghaffari (هومن غفاری), a famous player. Soroush taught himself in playing percussion, saxophone, piccolo, whistle, and recorder too. Towards graduating from the Music School, Soroush started working with various music groups and orchestras (classical, pop, rock, etc.).

After getting a diploma in music, he worked more professionally with more excellent groups and more professional players while teaching music. Having done his military service, he entered Music University while continuing his professional activities.

Soroush has played in numerous concerts around Iran and a few other countries.

After graduating from the University of Applied Science and Technology in Iran, in 2011 he went to London to continue his studies and was accepted into Middlesex University. There he attended various classes and workshops held by internationally renowned figures of music.

== Artistic collaborations ==
As an instrument player and arranger, Soroush Omoumi has collaborated with different world music groups and performed at various music events.

He has worked with singers and musicians such as Aref Arefkia, Faramarz Asef, Mehran Atash, Sami Beigi, Googoosh, Hengameh, Rana Mansour, Ayda Mosharraf, Babak Saeedi, Sattar, Shahram Shabpareh, Shakila, Shahyad, and many others.

Soroush also has collaborated with music bands such as Ajam, Nioush, Danoub, Zarbofoot, Tehran Wind Orchestra, Tehran Symphony Orchestra, and Alborz Symphonic Orchestra.

== Discography ==
=== Instrumental album ===
He produced his first instrumental album under the title of 18 in 2018 and released it in early 2019. The album is including 9 tracks as follow: "Avalanche", "Fate", "Alfie's Theme", "Four Seasons", "Dance of Wind", "A Spanish Love Song", "Annie's Song", "Le Basque", and "Imagine".

=== Collaboratings ===
Soroush also has collaborated in producing some other musicians' albums and tracks as composer, arranger, flutist, drummer, and/or percussionist.

==== Albums ====
Album's title	Singer	Poet/Songwriter	Composer	Arranger	Mixing	Genre	Soroush's role	Publishing year
Tāp-o -Toop	Iman Siahpouoshan	Iman Siahpoushan	Mehdi Rameshk	Mehrdad Abbasi	Babak Shahraki	Iranian pop	flutist	2008
Dārvag	Rouzbeh Ne'matollahi	Rumi	Rouzbeh Ne'matollahi	Payam Ghorbani	Arash Pakzad	Iranian pop	flutist	2013
Rag-o Risheh	Ajam band	Ajam band	Ajam band	Ajam band	Ajam band	fusion	percussionist	2016
Khāham Goft	Soroush Ghahramanlou	Niush band	Niush band	Keikavous Mokhtari	Keikavous Mokhtari	fusion rock	drummer	2019

==== Singles ====
Song's title	Singer	Poet/Songwriter	Composer	Arranger	Mixing	Genre	Soroush's role	Publishing year
Madyoun	Mehran Atash	Amir-Hossein Feizi	Babak Saeedi	Babak Saeedi	Babak Saeedi	Iranian pop	flutist, percussionist	2014
Tou ayeneh	Mehran Atash	Vahid Bayati	Sadegh Zeinali	Arash Azad	Babak Saeedi	Iranian pop	drummer	2016
Naya baroun	Majid Fallahpour	Yashar Yekta	Majid Fallahpour	Peiman Aslani	Farshad Hesami	Iranian pop	flutist	2016
Ba to	Salar Sepahroum	Salar Sepahroum	Salar Sepahroum	Amir-Milad Nikzad	Amir-Milad Nikzad	Iranian pop	flutist	2016
Shaparak	Ali Azimi	Ali Azimi	Ali Azimi, Ajam band	Ajam band	Ajam band	fusion	percussionist	2016
Eshgh-e mamnou'	Mehran Atash	Vahid Bayati	Sadegh Zeinali	Amir-Milad Nikzad	Amir-Milad Nikzad	Iranian pop	drummer, percussionist	2018
Donya-ye bi-mantegh	Pedram Abessi	Maryam Assadi	Mani Rahnama	Mani Rahnama	Hamid-Reza Ādāb (Pop Studio)	Iranian pop	flutist	2018
Salam az ghalb-e Iran	Amin Ajami, Mirza-Mas'oud Mousavi	Amin Ajami, Mirza-Mas'oud Mousavi	Amin Ajami	Ajam band	Soroush Omoumi	fusion	mixing, mastering	2018
Leila	Keivan Lachin	Falak Khorasani	Keivan Lachin	Dariush Salehpour	Dariush Salehpour	pop fusion	percussionist	2019

==== Turkish singles ====
Song's title	Singer	Poet/Songwriter	Composer	Arranger	Mixing	Genre	Soroush's role	Publishing year
Vazgeçmem	Ayda	Ayda	Yiğit Albayrak	ــ	Sermet Ağartan	Iranian pop	percussionist	2018
Senkron	Ayda	Ayda Mosharraf, Sermet Ağartan	Ayda Mosharraf, Sermet Ağartan	Sermet Ağartan	Sermet Ağartan	Iranian pop	percussionist	2019
