= Hiwa Seyfizade =

Hiwa Seyfizade هیوا سیفی زاده
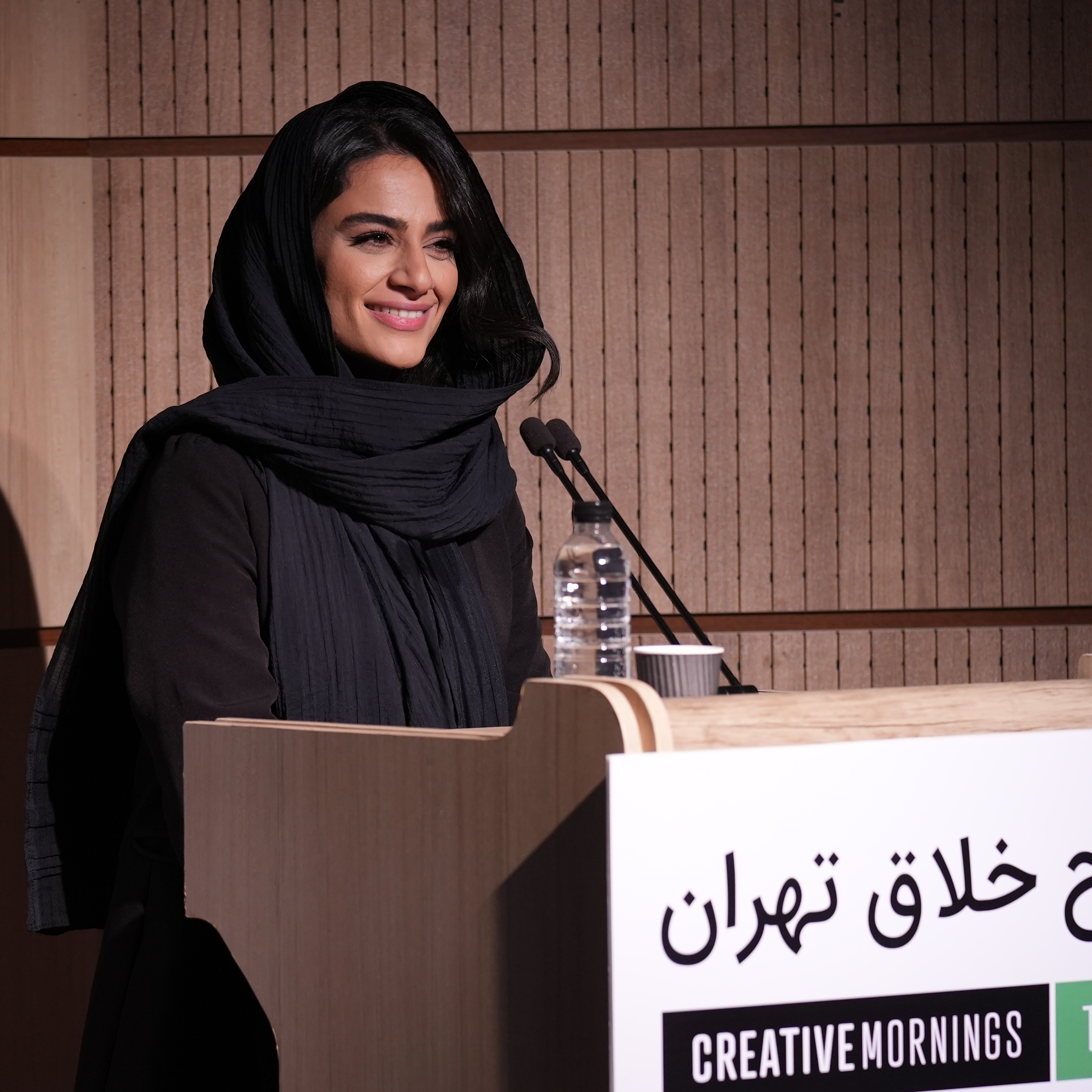
- A picture of Hiwa Seyfizade's speech at the 20th CreativeMornings event in Tehran

Background information
- Born: November 5, 1997 (age 28); Tehran, Iran
- Genres: Persian traditional music
- Occupations: Music teacher, tombak player, actor, singer
- Instrument: Tombak
- Years active: 2015–present
- Formerly of: Rastak Ensemble music group, "Avaye Mehrabani" music group, "Mouje No" Music Group, "Irani Pars" Orchestra
- Website: Official website

Hiwa Seyfizade (born November 5, 1997, in Tehran) is an Iranian classical music singer, Tombak player, theater actor and music teacher from Iran.

== Artistic life ==
Hiwa Seyfizade was born on November 5, 1997, in Tehran. She started learning Iranian classical singing from [[Masoumeh Mehrali]] in 2009. He also learned Tombak playing from Mehdi Esfahani, Iranian music theory from Arjang Seifyzadeh, and Iranian music compositions from Saarang Seifyzadeh.

In 2014, she participated in Navaye-Khorram Music Festival and was one of the winners of this festival. This festival was stopped due to the restriction of women's voices.

She was a member of the Rastak group led by Siamak Sepehri in 2021 and 2022 and went on stage with this group in Sulaymaniyah and Erbil.

She also went on stage in Vahdat Hall in 2015 with the collaboration of "Avaye-Mehrabani" music group. And in 2016, She performed in Vahdat Hall (Roudaki Hall) in cooperation with "Moje No" music group, composed by Ali ghamsari and conducted by Pouya Sarabi.

She also participated in the Tirgan Festival of Canada in 2021

In 2022, she appeared on the stage as a concert-play actor in the play "Cafe Asheghi (Love Cafe)" written and directed by Seyed Jalaledin Dorri and composed by Peyman Khazeni in the Niavaran Culture Hall and Shahrzad Theater Campus in Tehran, where she performed acting and singing. and in this guise, in 2023, She collaborated with the concert-show "Nakoja-Abaad" written by Mahmoud Tavasoliyan and directed by Sepideh Sabagh and composed by Peyman Khazeni, and went on stage in the Malek Theater Hall. Of course, her appearance in this show did not continue until the end of the performance, and a week after the show started, she published a notice on her Instagram social network and announced the termination of cooperation with this show. and in the following nights of the show, the second female singer of the show, Zohreh Firouzi, performed her role as "Parichehr".

In January 2024, she was present as a speaker at the 20th International Creative Mornings event in Tehran with the global theme of "Rise" and gave a speech about her career and life

== Education ==
She is a graduate of industrial engineering.

== Arrest of hiwa seyfizade ==
On February 27, 2025, Hiwa Seyfizade was arrested by security forces during a live performance at Emarat Rooberoo Hall in Tehran. The concert, which had reportedly received prior authorization, was interrupted when security personnel, including female officers, raided the venue and detained Seyfizade in front of the audience. The event was attended by both men and women. Following the arrest, the venue announced its closure until further notice, and Seyfizade was taken to an undisclosed location.

=== Reasons for arrest ===
The Iranian authorities have not issued a formal statement clarifying the reasons for Seyfizade's arrest. However, state media alleged that she was detained for organizing an unlicensed concert and performing as a solo female vocalist in the presence of male spectators. This act contravenes Iranian laws that prohibit women from singing solo before mixed-gender audiences. Opposition groups and human rights activists argue that her arrest is part of a broader crackdown on women defying restrictive laws, particularly those related to public appearances and artistic expression. Seyfizade had previously gained attention for performing without the mandatory hijab during protests against the regime.

=== Legal restrictions on female singers in iran ===
Since the establishment of the Islamic Republic in 1979, Iranian law has imposed severe restrictions on female singers. Women are prohibited from performing solo in front of male audiences and can only participate as background vocalists or as part of a group. These restrictions are rooted in interpretations of Islamic law that consider a woman's singing voice to be inappropriate for public settings where men are present. Additionally, women must adhere to strict dress codes, including wearing the hijab while performing. Violations of these laws can result in arrests, fines, or imprisonment.

=== Release from custody ===
On March 1, 2025, Seyfizade and other members of her group were released on bail. Her lawyer confirmed that only the concert organizer remained in custody at that time. The release followed significant public criticism and international attention on her arrest. However, the authorities have not disclosed whether any formal charges will be pursued against Seyfizade or her team.

== Art activities ==
Title	Publish Year	Location
Chosen of the first edition of "Navaye-Khorram" Music Festival	2015	Vahdat Hall
Operat "Khorous Zari, Pirhan Pari"	2015	Vahdat Hall
Cooperation with "Avaye Mehrabani" music group	2016	Vahdat Hall
Animal pond operetta	2016	Vahdat Hall
Receive Summit30 certificate from Attar Foundation	2017	Niavaran Complex
Cooperation with "Irani Pars" Orchestra	2017	Vahdat Hall
Cooperation with "Mouje No" Music Group	2018	Vahdat Hall
Attending the Tirgan Festival	2022	Toronto
Cooperation with "Rastak" music group	2022–2023	Sulaymaniyah, Erbil
Actor-singer in the show "Cafe Asheghi"	2023	Shahrzad Theater Hall
Actor-singer in the show "Nakoja Abad"	2023	Malek theater Hall
