= Rastak Ensemble =

Iranian musical group

Rastak Music Group is an Iranian contemporary folk music ensemble that was formed as an experimental music group in 1997. Rastak seeks to collect, record and interpret Iranian, Kurdish, Baloch and Turkmen folk music among others for a global audience.

== About Rastak ==
Rastak incorporates Persian language, Iranian culture and history as well as merging traditional instruments and forms with contemporary rhythms. Rastak has done extensive research into Persian folk music both academically and in practice. They have been focused for the past two decades on the sound of Iranian folklore and diverse cultures; resulting in five albums, five singles and numerous concert tours in Iran and overseas.

== International Appearances ==
Rastak has appeared on several international music festivals and has held many concerts in Iran, England, Austria, Germany, France, Italy, Spain, The Netherlands, Sweden, United States, Canada, Australia, India, Japan, Malaysia, Chile, Poland, Turkey, Georgia, Belgium, Oman, Belarus, Kazakhstan, Bangladesh, Iraq, United Arab Emirates among others.

=== International World Music Festivals ===
Rastak has performed at various international music festivals. Recently, they performed at the Rainforest World Music Festival 2023 in Sarawak, Malaysia, and the Spirit of Tengri World Music Festival in Almaty, Kazakhstan, where they wowed audiences with their captivating performances. They also performed in Slemani, Hawaii Sahar Music Festival, where they shared their culture and music with their fans and friends. On August 14, 2024, they performed at prestigious Stockholm Culture Festival (Kultur Festivalen) and received well by the audience.

== Members ==
Over two decades have passed since Rastak’s inception, during which the group has grown both in quality and quantity. The eight talented members of Rastak each bring unique expertise in traditional and folklore Iranian instruments and musical styles. The band’s direction comes from Siroos (Siamak) Sepehri, a visionary leader who shapes Rastak’s artistic path with his deep knowledge of Iranian folk, classical music, and Western classical music. Farzad Moradi is a talented lead singer and multi-instrumentalist with profound knowledge of Iranian folk musical heritage; he started playing the Tanbur, a sacred instrument from Kurdistan, at the age of five. Behzad Moradi is one of the band’s most talented musicians and singers, particularly skilled in various folk percussions, especially the Daf. His magical voice, precise technique, and ability to imitate different dialects and languages from across Iran have significantly contributed to Rastak. Maedeh (Dina) Doosti, known for her expertise in Kamancheh, Gheychak, and Kamanche alto, adds depth and authenticity to the band's sound. Her expressive performances help bridge the gap between Iran’s musical heritage and contemporary audiences, enriching Rastak’s fusion of folk and modern elements. Akbar Esmaeilipour Farsangi, a talented multi-instrumentalist, has extensive experience playing various Iranian classical and folk musical instruments. His musical talent and taste have significantly contributed to Rastak’s arrangements. Majid Poosti is a musician skilled in playing native percussion instruments from various regions of Iran. His knowledge and research into percussions from different ethnicities and regions have greatly contributed to the band. Sahar Rashiditorbati, the youngest band member, plays the Qanun in Rastak. Behzad Pournaghi, one of the co-founders, is a musician and co-composer who arranges the band's music under the artistic direction of Siamak Sepehri. With a strong background in electronic music and sound design, along with his knowledge of Iranian folk instruments, Behzad plays a crucial role in guiding and directing sound engineers during both live concerts and studio recordings.

- Siamak Sepehri: Co-founder, Band Director, Tar Player
- Farzad Moradi: Vocalist and multi instrumentalist
- Behzad Moradi: Vocalist and percussionist
- Dina Doosti: Kamancheh and Kamancheh alto player
- Majid Poosti: Percussionist
- Akbar Esmaeilipour: Tar, Oud, Setar
- Sahar Rashidi: Qanun
- Behzad Pournaghi: Co-founder, Co-composer, Manager

== Guest Artists ==
=== Previous Members ===
Omid Mostafavi, Hamed Bolandhemmat, Yasaman Najmeddin, Parisa Inanloo, Yavar Ahmadifar, Mohammad Mazhari, Piran Mohajeri, Sepehr Saadati, Sara Naderi, Kaveh Sarvarian, Yaser Navazandeh, Farzad Khorshidsavar, Negar Ezazi, Saba Jamali, Reza Abedia, Sahar Ebrahim, Nima Niktab, Sara Ahmadi, Hosna Parsa, Danoosh Asadpour, Bita Ghasemi, Hiwa Seyfizadeh

== Instruments ==
=== Strings ===
Tar, Qanun, Oud, Kamancheh, Santur, Kamancheh alto, Bam Tar, Tanbur, Dotar, Ghoppoz, Divan, Gheyhak, Rubab, Azeri Tar, Tanboorak, Gheychak Bass, Double Bass, Cello, Guitar, Bass Guitar

=== Percussions ===
Tombak, Daf, Dholak, Damam, Naqareh, Desar Koten, Zarb, Zarb Timpo, Dayereh, Bandir, Dayereh Zangi, Dhol, Dom Dom, Kaser, Pipeh, Kasooreh, Tas, Halab, Darbuka, Cajón, Tambourine, Cymbal, Senjak

=== Wind Instruments ===
Sorna, Nayanban, Balaban, Dozaleh, Nay Jofti, Qoshmeh, Gharaney, Labak, Neylabak, Laleva, Ney, Donaley, Karnay

== Albums and Singles ==
=== Rangvareha-ye-Kohan (Ancient Hues) – Audio, 2007 ===
Also known as Ancient Hues is Rastak's first album and has 12 audio tracks. Iran is a vast country with a long history where the wide range of ethnic minorities comprising one nation, is illustrative of congeniality, culture interaction and strong bonds among Iranians. The pieces of this collection as part of a rich spiritual legacy, belong to a number of these ethnicities; however, they have been given a rather fair air.

==== Tracks ====
1. Hoor (Sun) – Bases on the ancient mode of Tanbur
2. Soon-o-Soog (Festivity & Mourning) – An adaptation of Lorestan & Kermanshah music
3. Hejran (Far & Away) – Unaccompanied Kamacheh
4. Paeezeh (Autumn) – Based on a Kurdish local melody
5. Eshragh (Intuition) – Unaccompanied Oud
6. Souda (Passion) – Inspired by a melody from Khorasan
7. Kavir (Desert) – A trio for 2 Tars and 1 Dutar
8. Kajal (Deer) – Based on a local tune from Kurdistan
9. Shoopeh (Glow Worm) – Instrumental piece in Mazandarani
10. Haraee – Based on modes from Mazandaran music
11. Kooran (River) – Instrumental music, incorporating music from Mazandaran and Balochistan
12. Banoor (Bride) – Based on Balochi "sout" mode

=== Hame-ye Aghvam-e Man (All My Homeland People) – Audio and Video, 2010 ===
==== Tracks ====
1. Baroon – Lori
2. Raana – Gilaki
3. Gal Gal – Azeri
4. Leyla – Khorasan
5. Souzaleh – Kurdi
6. Balal – Bakhiari
7. Marochan – Balochi

=== Sorna-ye Nowruz / Video album, 2013 ===
Rastak's 3rd album Sornay-e Nowruz. It comprises 6 audio and video tracks from Bushehr, Fars, Mazandaran, Kormanj, Baluchestan, Azerbaijan, Gilan and Kurdistan.

==== Tracks ====
1. Heleh Mali – Bushehr
2. Yar – Fars province
3. Lareh – Mazandaran
4. Allah Khaneh – Kormanji
5. Hal Haleh – Qashqai
6. Sorna-ye Nowruz – Bakhtiari, Khorasan, Mazandarani, Azeri, Balochi, Gilaki and Kurdi

=== Mian-e Khorshidha-ye Hamisheh (Among Eternal Suns) – Audio & Video album, 2016 ===
Is Rastak's interpretation of the music of Iran's varied cultures- "Sun" that steadily shine over and across this land generating music as well as ideas. Rastak endeavors is to make use of these endless treasures, and feels indebted to them. "Among Eternal Suns" includes 10 audio and video tracks from Kerman, Khuzestan, Hormozgan, Kurdestan, Gars, Baluchestan and Azerbaijan.

==== Tracks ====
1. Sakineh – Kerman
2. Biu Barimesh – Khuzestan
3. Ey Yaar – Hormozgan
4. Havaar
5. Botorai – Kurdistan
6. Vasoonak – Fars
7. Zahirook
8. Allah Mani Barag – Blochestan
9. Sanin Yadegarin – Azerbaijan
10. Lezgi

=== Bahar – Audio & Video album, 2018 ===
New experiences about new arrangements and the use of guitar and cello in combination with Iranian musical instruments. Celebrating Spring, Rastak's latest album includes folk songs from different parts of Iran, with folk lyrics in different languages and dialects. All these tracks have praise of Spring and the Persian New Year as their central theme, hence the name of the album: Bahar (Spring)

==== Tracks ====
1. Mandir – Bakhtiari
2. Shekoufeh – Fars
3. Nowruz – Hormozgan
4. Gol-e-Pamchal – Guilan
5. Wahar – Kurdistan
6. Gol Poune – Fars
7. Lala Lar – Azerbaijan

=== Borderless at Home – Audio Singles 2019–2020 ===
In this project Rastak is working on the music of Iran neighboring countries to be a messenger of peace while depicting the beauty of Middle Eastern music and culture. The idea of this album was born due to the positive feedbacks in overseas performances.

==== Tracks ====
1. Laily Jan -Dari
2. Hyo Hayo Hiye – Arabic
3. Asum En Te – Armenian
4. Kuchalar – Azeri
5. Kara Uzum Habbasi – Turkish
6. Laylo – Kurmanji

=== Dance With Rastak – Audio and Video Album 2021 ===
==== Tracks ====
1. Owina (Based on an Azeri song)
2. Ow Bordom (Based on North Khuzestan music)
3. Faatelo (Based on a song from Kerman)
4. Kamarey (Derived from Kurdish music)
5. Shadoomad (Derived from Khorasan music)
6. Asemoon (Based on a song from Shiraz)

=== Essentials 2023 ===
==== Tracks ====
1. Sakineh (Based on a song from south of Kerman)
2. Laleler (Based on a song from Azerbaijan)
3. Sozaleh (A Kurdish song)
4. Baroon (A famous tune from Lorestan)
5. Botorai (Derived from a Kurdish tune)
6. Raana (A Gilaki song from the north of Iran)
7. Leila (Based on a song from Khorasan)
8. Wahar (Based on a Kurdish song)
9. Vasoonak (A very famous tune from Shiraz)
10. Tanbur (Based on a Kurdish song and a Maqam for Tanbur)

Please read the album review by Neil van der Linden in Songlines magazine December 2023 (#193)

=== Tales of Earth and Sun 2025 ===
"Tales of Earth and Sun" is a journey through the heart of folk music, bringing together six tracks inspired by the rich musical traditions of Kurdistan, Lorestan, Balochistan, Hormozgan, Kermanshah, and a heartfelt love song from Afghanistan. Each piece carries the spirit of a place, telling stories of joy, struggle, and memories that connect generations.

==== Tracks ====
1. Havar Havar (Hormozgan)
2. Dora Dora (Lorestan)
3. Aman Hey Aman (Kurdistan)
4. Zim Zim (Afghanistan)
5. Halo Halo (Balochistan)
6. Azadi (Kermanshah)

=== Sombre Sky ===
Sombre Sky (AKA Aseman-e-kaboud), (Persian: آسمان کبود) is a single recorded in Istanbul and published in 2022. It is based on an old song performed by Iradj Mahdian.

=== Tehna ===
"Tehna" is a heartfelt love song by Rastak that merges traditional Bakhtiari music with modern electronic elements, offering a fresh sound to an ancient tale of love and longing. In Bakhtiari, "Tehna" means "lonely," and the song encapsulates the solitude and yearning of a lover separated from their beloved. Soulful vocals and traditional Iranian instruments weave together with subtle electronic rhythms, creating an evocative atmosphere that captures the resilience and depth of love, enduring across time and distance. "Tehna" is both a homage to Bakhtiari
