= Crows in the Rain =

Iranian band

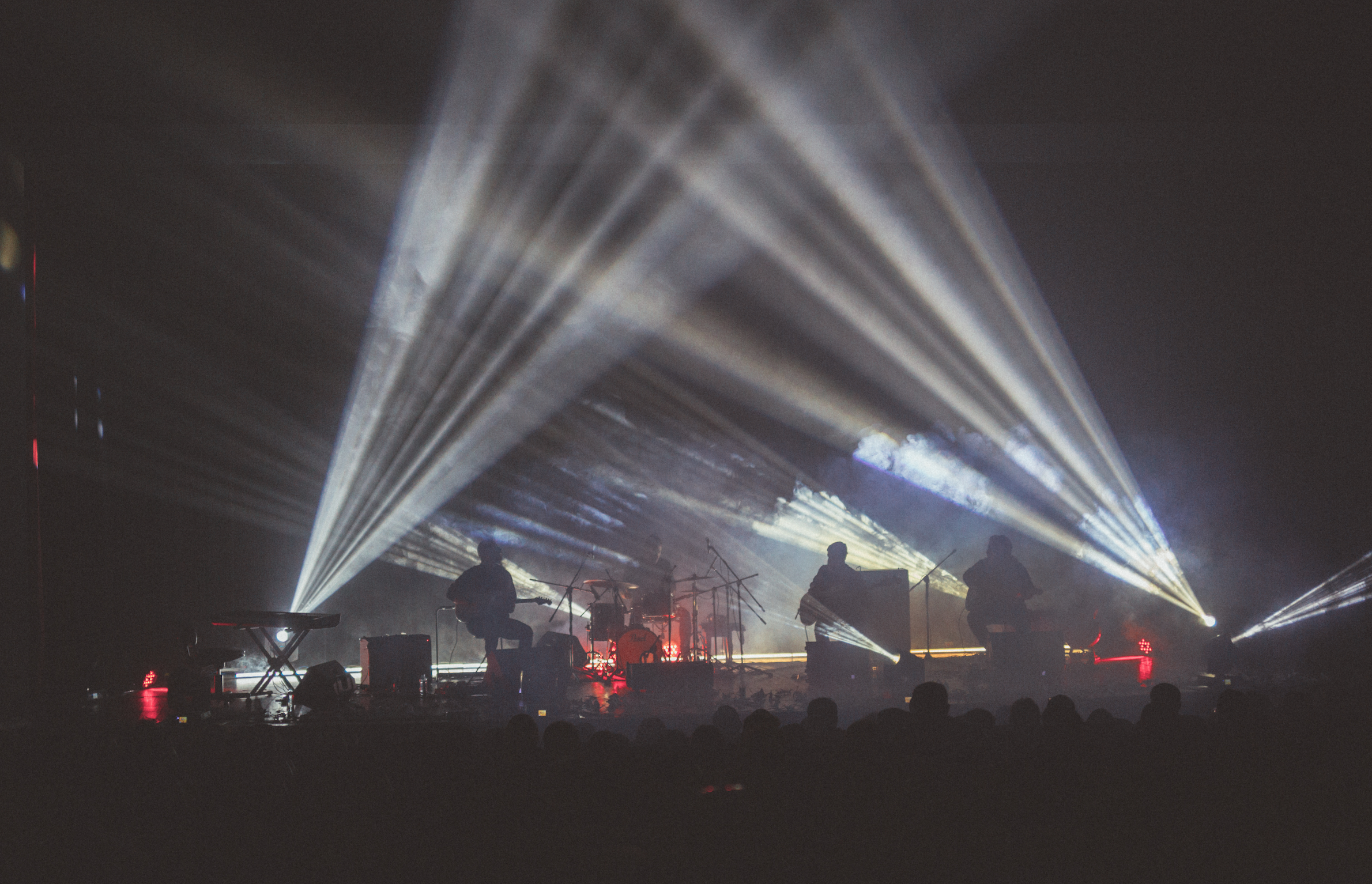
- Crows in the Rain - Live performance - 2019

Background information
- Origin: Tehran, Iran
- Genres: Post-rock; Ambient; Neo-Classical
- Years active: 2014-present
- Labels: Crows in the Rain, Hortus Conclusus Records
- Members: Masih Taj; Hamed Fahimi Ju; Ashkan Karimi; Masoud Keramat
- Past members: Amir hossein Abbasi

Crows in the Rain is an Iranian post-rock band which was formed in Tehran in 2014. It is among the first post-rock bands in Iran. After their first album was released, they became popular as the first Iranian ambient post-rock band. They were also known as “The Crows”. The band's music is a blend of post-rock and neo-classical style. The core of the band consists of Masih Taj (Electric guitar, piano), Hamed Fahimi Jou (Electric guitar), Ashkan Karimi (bass guitar), who had been intimate friends for many years before the band was formed. One of the characteristics of Crows In The Rain is that the lead guitar and rhythm guitar are swirling in a different way between Masih Taj and Hamed Fahimi Ju.

== History ==
=== Formation: 2014–2015 ===
In the fall of 2014, Hamed and Masih shared their dreams about composing music together. Accordingly, the basic foundations of the Crows In The Rain band were built. The band was named on the basis of what happened in the first jamming between the two. In a rainy afternoon, when Hamed and Masih were playing a tune together, they succeeded at making their first track after a few hours. After they listened to their first track, they named it “The Rain” under the influence of weather conditions. At the same time and in a random manner, they noticed the presence of a large circle of crows in the rainy sky. So, they named the track and the band Crows In The Rain.

After that, they decided to compose more songs and form their feelings and ideas. Therefore, several tracks were created a few months later, such as “Forgotten Childhood”, “Dreaming”, and “You Were There”. They uploaded them on the internet. According to the members of the band, so many tracks were created in that period but they were not released. After that period, the band decided to collect an album and worked on the tracks for a while. Since spring 2015, they began to work on the album. In summer 2015, they released one of the album tracks as a single track. The finalization of the album lasted until the beginning of winter 2015. Eventually, the first album of “The Crows” was released in February 2016.

=== You Are Dying in My Arms: 2015–2016 ===
The name of the first album by Crows In The Rain is You are Dying in my Arms. The album's genre is Ambient and Neo-classical. According to The Crows’ interview, the first album was just about the band's Inner voices. In fact, no other factor was taken into account but emotions, and The Crows were looking for their inner status. In order to form the album through dozens of tracks, ten tracks were selected. The basis for this selection was a feeling about their lost friend. According to the band members, the loss of a friend was an excuse to understand the main concept of the songs, and that feeling is a sense of distance and separation that all the people may have experienced within themselves. After their first album was released, the tracks were greeted by the audience and quickly shared.

The first album tells a story that was composed in many chapters. “It was 2016 Chaharshanbe Suri that we started composing instead of celebrating, and the result was the track of Trust the Universe. the reason for the track denomination was that it was a sentence widely used by our lost friend, and because she loved the track, that name was chosen for this piece,” Hamad and Masih said.

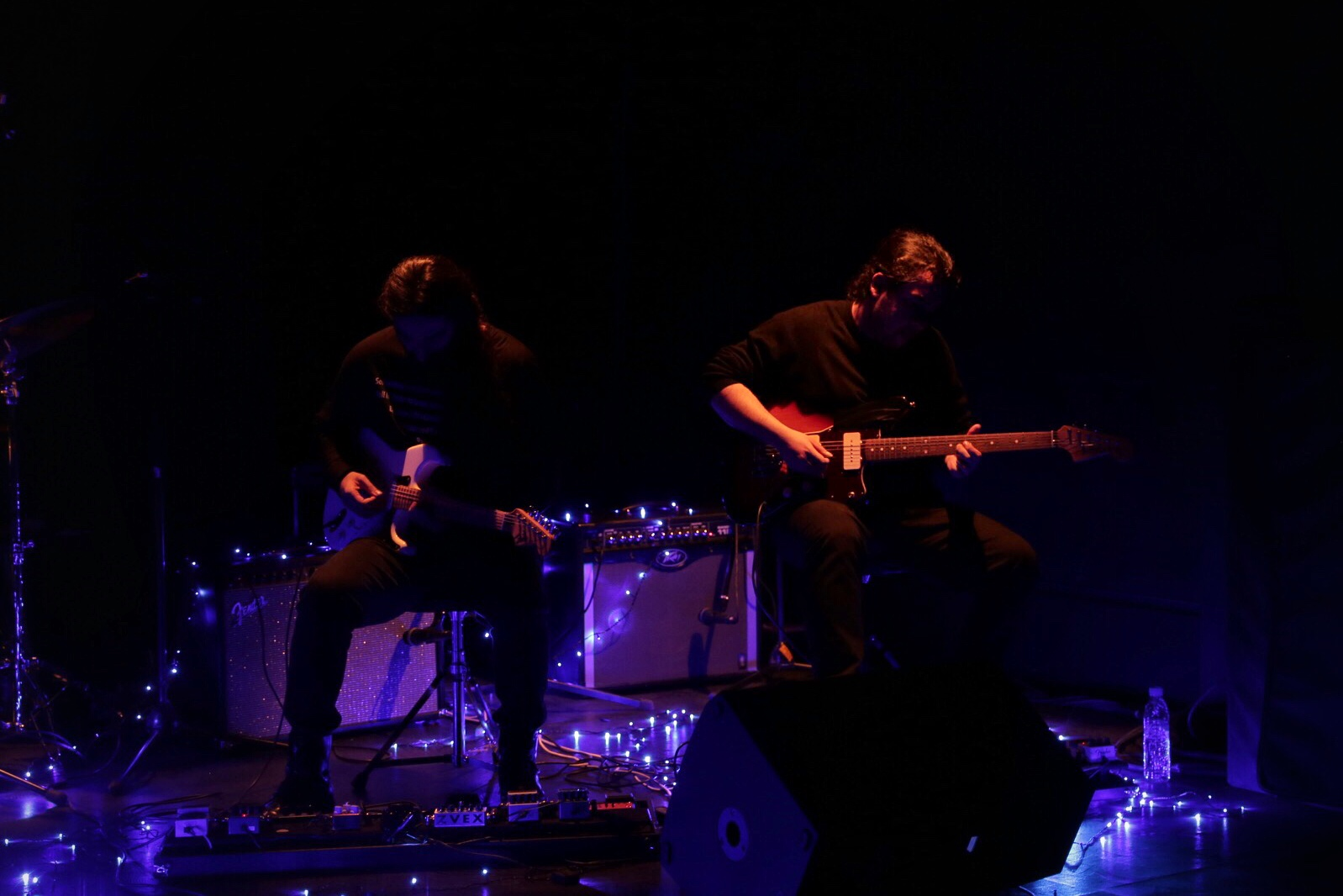
Hamed and Masih Performing in 2017 - Shiraz

Another track of this album was named I am not the body; I am not even the mind. Members of the band are used to meditating before improvising playing each tune and this track was created just after a deep and specific meditation. The track Please be well, Is it too late? was played and denominated under the influence of the song Horses in the Sky composed by the Canadian band “Thee Silver Mt. Zion Memorial Orchestra”. Another track in the album is called You Are Dying in My Arms. This track was anonymous at the beginning and the album was supposed to be called Trust the Universe. While naming the track, one of the best friends of the band's members suggested this name. At the very moment, the album was named after this due to its meaning and emotional connotation. The track “The End” is one of the final tracks of the album. The track, according to Hamed and Masih, indicates the peak feeling of loneliness and isolation we have experienced from within.

=== Little Girl and Lost Blossom: 2016–2017 ===
The band continues to take a more serious look at its future after releasing the first album and its resulted in working on their second album. The second album was also warmly welcomed by the audience and their fans. The genre of the album is rather Neo-classical and ambient. The album was formed in spring 2017. The album was unveiled and released quite informally. The unveiling of this album was performed differently and on Valiasr street (one of the major and well-known streets in Tehran) with the presence of the audience and fans of the band.

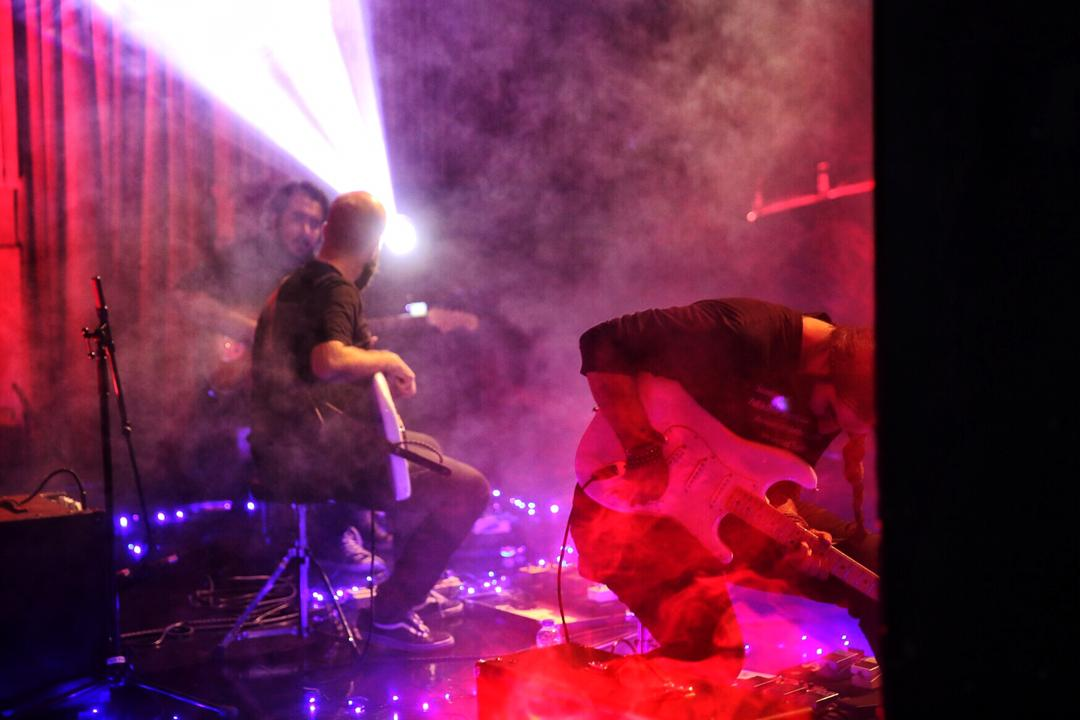
Crows in the Rain Live Performance - Hamed, Ashkan and Masih ( from left to right ) - 2019

The album's idea, formation, and release started at the point that, according to the members of the band, this album was the result of an astounding journey. The Crows spent 24 hours outside the house on a different journey and spent 12 hours in nature alone. The experience they gained in 12 hours and what happened to the Crows led to the formation of the main story of the second album. It was a metaphysical and inorganic experience, so that a year after the journey, all the tracks made by the band was influenced by that 12 hours and all its strange experiences.

The tracks in the album express unique concepts and names. With regard to this, the Crows say:

In fact, the Fatherland was the land we journeyed to in our special experience, and there were extraterrestrial beings that we felt their presence, and so we named the land the Fatherland. Little girl and Lost Blossom is the story of one of those creatures in part of that land called the Second Death, and the expression of her grief and sadness.

The track "... (For a Film)" tells the story of the moment when the band is saying goodbye to the little girl in their minds and leaves the land of Second Death. This track was collected in the very first year by Morego Dimma under the label Unexplored sounds group, and was released under the English label Cold Spring in the form of the album Visions of Darkness (Iranian Contemporary Music).

=== Ashes of the Past: 2017–2018 ===
The album Ashes of the Past has had a stylish leap over the past two albums. The album's genre is post-rock. Adding the bass and the drums to another style, the band seems to have moved toward the core of the post-rock style. In this album, the style of the band’s jammings from home jamming to studio jamming and with the addition of new instruments has taken a different form. Like the previous two albums, this album was unofficially released, as well. The unveiling ceremony of the album took place at a local café named Kafeh Aparteman (Café Apartment) in Tehran in May 2017.

In winter 2017, Ashkan as the bassist and Amir Hossein as the drummer joined the Crows In The Rain band. The Crows decided to go on the stage for the first time in 2017, sharing their feeling through live music with their audience. They worked on their third album until fall 2017. Before their album was officially released, they held their first concert at the Koral Music School Hall (Hamdelan) by playing some pieces from the third album for the first time in November 2017. Twenty-four days later, the second performance of the Crows, as well as the first and largest official post-rock concert in Iran, took place in Azadi Tower Hall.

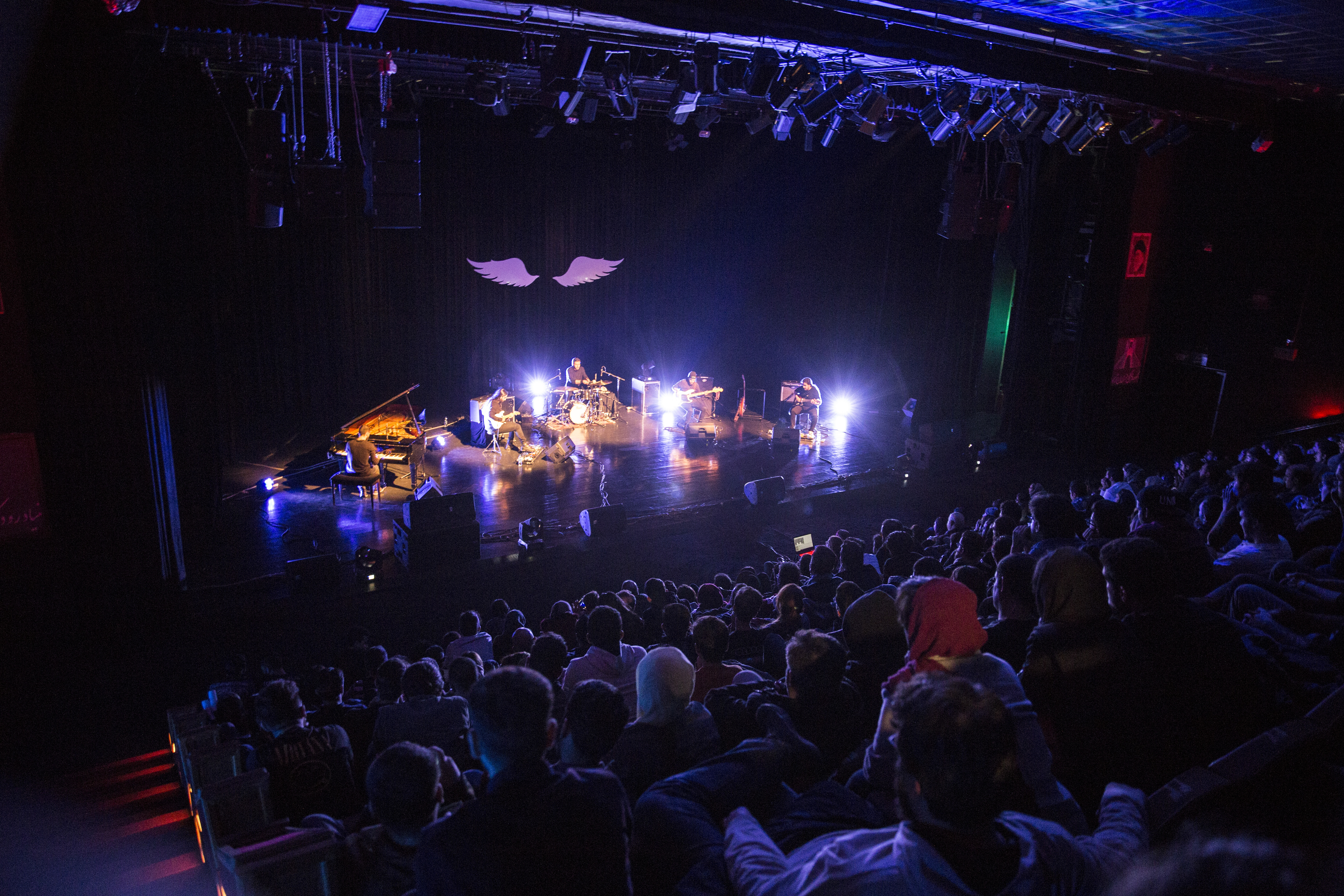
Crows in the Rain - Live at Azadi Tower Hall - 2018

The Crows decided to release their third album in January 2018, but it did not happen because of some issues. In the meantime, they staged a concert in Shiraz in two sequences, at the Kian black box artistic and cultural complex. When they returned to Tehran, the Crows were invited to a conference in the 900-seat auditorium of Tehran University, where they performed two of their third and non-published album. In the same year, as a guest band, they were invited to participate in the festival opening ceremony and set off on stage. In March 2018, they performed their dedicated performance in Koral Academy Arena.

The album Ashes of the past consists of 11 pieces. This album was released with Italian label Hortus Conclusus Records. The first piece of the album is called Beyond the Flying Mountains. Beyond the Flying Mountains was built after the first jammings with new instruments and a different style. The Crows In The Rain band now has reached a point where they acknowledged that they can express what has been engraved in their minds since the beginning in the form of music. The track marked the beginning of the album and served as a milestone for the band’s style transformation into the post-rock, the same post-rock style already imagined in the minds of all the band’s members.

"Requiem for a Dreamer" is the name of another piece of the album. The track was initially ignored by the band, but after all the members of the band listened to it again, they decided to finalize it and put it in the album. The important thing about the track is that the band shows its internal grief and sorrow in a different atmosphere. According to the members of the band, the track is the sentiments of a dreamer who cannot dream anymore.

"I will build the future on the past of the memories" was the last studio track of the album to be created. The reason for the track denomination was that the band members reached a consensus to leave the past with all its sadness and grief behind and start to build up the future from its ashes. The dreamer is dreaming again on his own ashes in this position.

=== Sorrow for an Unfinished Dream: 2018–2019 ===
Sorrow for an Unfinished Dream is the fourth album and the third studio album by the Crows In The Rain band. It is the first dependent official album by the band in Iranian market. The album’s style is Neo-classical and post-rock. The album is an epitome of the combination of the last three albums of the Crows In The Rain and may be called a pure extract from the nature of the Crows In The Rain band. After their second and third albums were released, the Crows attempted to perform musical improvisation with more experience and skill, and the result was the beginning of the fourth album. Over the past few years, certain tracks have been made by the band, and the tracks are being played in a diverse manner, combined with the last two albums in the band concerts. Over time, new tracks were made and added to the playlist.

The Crows In The Rain band had a performance in two sequences in Shiraz in August 2018, at the Kian black box artistic and cultural complex, where they played some tracks from the album of the Ashes of the past as well as the fourth album. Five months later, they were re-performing at Azadi Tower Hall. After a little while, they had another performance at Eyvan-e Shams Hall.

The unveiling ceremony of the band’s fourth album was held after the live performance of the band at the Niavaran Cultural Center in spring 2019, with the band’s extensive audience and fans. After the unveiling ceremony of the album was held, the album's first music video was released, which was warmly welcomed by the fans and critics. The band also unveiled the album in the cities of Isfahan, Shiraz, Kerman, and Rasht.

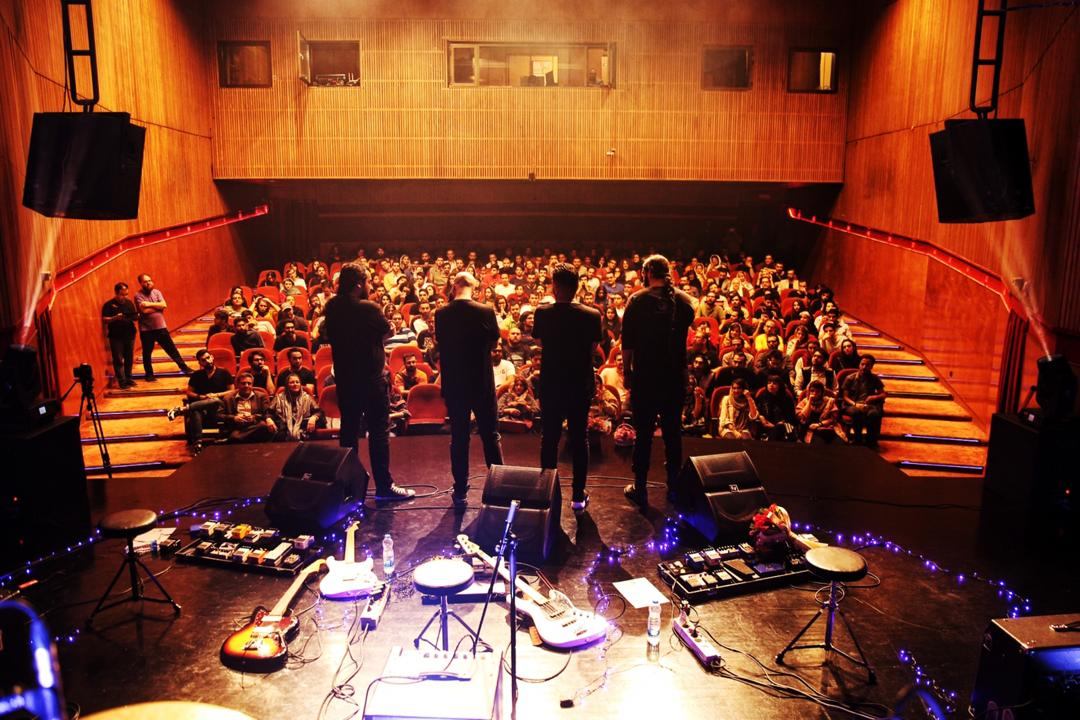
Crows in the Rain Live at Niavaran Cultural Center - 2019

While making the songs, the band began to realize that the concept of tracks created is closely related to the concepts of the tracks created in advance that have not been published to date. As a result, the old tracks were added to the new tracks, resulting in the formation of the fourth album, which may be called the most sophisticated and successful album by the Crows In The Rain band.

The album consists of 10 studio albums. Two years prior to the album's release, the earlier lines of the track "This is our cry" had been written. It was in the band's archive. While naming the rest of the album’s tracks, this track came into account accidentally, and this was a turning point for forming the concept of the album.

In the process of composing the album, the track "Unfinished Dream of Sadako" was the last track which was made. According to the band members, when the track was made, we felt that the album was finished and had completed its mission. Here there were signs such as paper cranes, origami and the story of Sadako Sasaki. The band came to the conclusion that the story of Sadaku Sasaki was very close to what the band was trying to express in the album. Consequently, the track was named "Unfinished Dream of Sadako". It is the ensign and the main mask of the album. The band’s first music video is also derived from the same track. The general concept seen in the band’s fourth album is unrealized dreams. It may be said that the main message of the Crows In The Rain band is the same unrealized dreams. The signs of this concept can be observed from the second single track called Dreaming in the first year of band formation to the last album. In this vein, another track of the fourth album is The Legend of the Cranes. The track is more reminiscent of the track You are Dying in My Arms for the band. It represents the grandeur of the effort to fight for dreams and hope for unrealized dreams.

"Now you can sleep" is the last track of the album, which has a different story from the rest of the songs. Masih’s grandmother laid on her deathbed, suffering from insomnia. When she heard the track, she could sleep after a few days of sleeplessness. After a little while, as soon as the band was performing in Shiraz, Masih’s grandmother died a few hours before the performance. The band states that after this, we discovered that this track, with all its incidents, is the best ending for the album.

== Musical style ==
Although the band’s musical style has undergone changes since the band has started working, it has a different style in ambient/post-rock. that has been shaped by the Crows In The Rain. The formation of the band’s musical taste has been adapted from a combination of the musical taste of Masih and Hamad. The musical style Masih was listening to and playing was Neo-Classical, New Age, and Meditation. On the other hand, the musical style Hamed was listening to and playing was Rock and Metal. The blend of these two tastes has been the basis for the formation of the band’s style at the beginning of their work.

In the second album, after Hamed was more into the classical music, the album’s atmosphere became more ambient. In the third album, where Ashkan and Amir Hossein joined the band as bassist and drummer, the style of the band approached the main goal of the Crows In The Rain band, which could be called the pure post-rock. In addition to this, the presence of the jazz taste background of the band’s drummer caused the third album to have the elements of the jazz music whose signs can be seen in the fourth album and especially in the track "a scintilla of hope". In the fourth album, the maximum coordination can be observed among the members of the band, resulting in the combination of the styles of the last three albums and the band’s movement towards reaching the ideal style they opted for.

== Awards and honors ==
- New York festivals- Radio Awards

2018, "Finalist certificate".

- Best Post-rock of the Year

In April 2019, Ashes of the past were placed on the list "Best Album of 2018", chosen by Reddit Channel.

- The Best Post-rock Albums and Eps of the 21st Century

In June 2019, Crows in the Rain were placed on the list "The Best Post-rock Albums and Eps of the 21st Century", #67.

== Members ==
Current members

- Masih Taj – Guitar, Piano
- Hamed Fahimi Ju – Guitar, Piano
- Ashkan Karimi – Bass, Synthesizer
- Masoud Keramat – Drums

Former members

- Amir Hossein Abbasi – Drums

== Discography ==
=== Studio albums ===
- You Are Dying in My Arms (The Frozen Last Gasps) (2016)
- Little Girl and Lost Blossom (2017)
- Ashes of the Past (2018)
- Sorrow for an Unfinished Dream (2019)
- Dri:m Wan; Därk Blü (2020)

=== Compilation albums ===
- Visions of Darkness – Iranian Contemporary Music (2017)

=== Singles ===
- "Forgotten childhood" (2014)
- "Dreaming" (2015)
- "You Were There" (2015)
- "The Tale of Creation within Her Being (Atman of Abhimata)" (2015)
- "Dri:merz Path / Way" (2020)

=== Music videos ===
- "Unfinished Dream of Sadako" (2019)
