= Mehdi Bagheri =

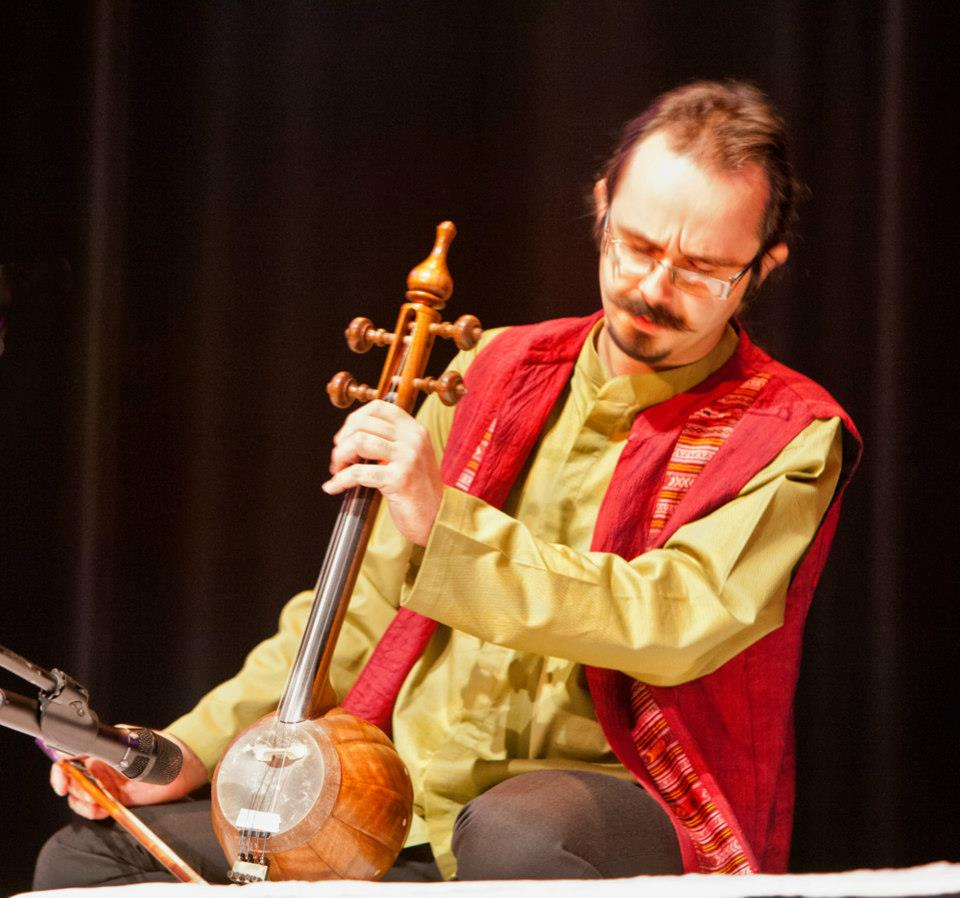
- ¡Globalquerque Festival, USA, September 2012

Background information
- Born: Mehdi Bagheri; November 16, 1980 (age 45); Kermanshah, Iran
- Origin: Kermanshah, Iran
- Genres: Traditional Iranian Music; Kurdish Music; Fusion music
- Occupations: Professional Kamancheh player, Composer
- Instruments: Kamancheh, Setar
- Website: mehdibagherimusic.com

Mehdi Bagheri (Persian: مهدی باقری), (born 16 November 1980), is an Iranian kamancheh player and composer.

== Biography ==
Mehdi was born in Kermanshah in 1980. He began his musical endeavors by learning to play the Tonbak instructed by Ramin Tafazoli. He then started learning other instruments in order to familiarize himself even further with Iranian music and composing. These included the Setar and Kamancheh; he finally chose Kamancheh as his main instrument. He learned to play the Kamancheh by Maestros Kayhan Kalhor and Ardeshir Kamkar. Simultaneously, he studied Drama at Azad University and graduated with a Bachelor of Arts in 2003. Mehdi has held several concerts across the world and has performed in a variety of credible festivals and halls including:

== Festivals and Concerts ==
- Berklee College of Music (Boston- United States)
- Oslo Word Music Festival (Oslo - Norway)
- Morgenland Festival Osnabrück (East Music Festival in Osnabrueck, Germany)
- Kursaal Festival (San Sebastián- Spain)
- Théâtre de la Ville(Paris - France)
- Michigan Festival of Sacred Music (Michigan - United States)
- Opéra de Lille (Lille - France)
- Marc Bloch University (Strasbourg- France)
- Joint concert with the Berlin Radio Choir (Rundfunkchor Berlin) and performances of his works in the RBB Hall (Germany)
- Erciyes University (Turkey)
- EFRI University (France)
- Ford's Theatre (Los Angeles - United States)
- Smithsonian Institution (Washington DC - United States)
- Palace of Fine Arts (San Francisco - United States)
- Columbia University (New York City - United States)
- ¡Globalquerque! (New Mexico - United States)
- Festival Polignac (Guidel, France)
- Southbank Centre (London - UK)
- Montana Folk Festivals (Montana - United States) ...

== Works ==
In Iran and abroad, Mehdi has been dynamically pursuing his work in different fields such as music in film, eclectic music and Iranian classical music. He has also published a variety of works with a great many number of singers and musicians. Amongst all, his most important works include recording and publishing the radif (the old melodic figures preserved through many generations by oral tradition) by Maestro Ali-Akbar Shahnazi; solo and group pieces for Kamanche, and more.

- Recordings radif Ali-Akbar Shahnazi
- In The Faraway Clouds
- Kamancheh Ensemble
- Assassin's Creed Mirage game music
