= Dehati (Shadmehr Aghili album) =

Dehati (دهاتی The Villager ) is a 1999 Persian-language pop album by Shadmehr Aghili. By mid-2014, the album was announced as the best-selling Iranian Pop album in history, having sold over 10 million units around the world.
