= Ajam (band) =

Iranian roots music project

- Also known as: Ajam Music
- Genres: Iranian roots music
- Years active: 2010–present
- Label: Independent
- Members: Amin Mohammad Fouladi (a.k.a. Amin Ajami); Arash Fayyazi; Nariman Akrami; Sara Fotros
- Website: www.ajammusic.com

Ajam (Persian: عجم) is an Iranian roots music project that creates original contemporary music by utilizing elements of the native music of Iran. In particular, the focus of this project is on "people’s" music and has been developed through research and field studies. The Ajam project started in London in early 2010 and has since performed various concerts across Europe, North America and the Middle East.

== Members ==
Ajam comprises four main members, referred to as "the Ajam Family" and "a rotating cast of Iranian musicians who perform on recordings and tours" who are referred to as "Ajam’s Guests" and "Extended Family".

The concept of the project was conceived by

- Amin Mohammad Fouladi (a.k.a. Amin Ajami)

and the core of the Ajam family comprises:

- Arash Fayyazi
- Nariman Akrami
- Sara Fotros

== Vocal style and poetry ==
The soundscape presented in Ajam’s musical repertoire comprises traditional urban, rural and tribal melodic, and percussion instruments complemented by urban and rock beats and bass lines. "Their music presents a blend of rooted, traditional folk music with a contemporary touch". Ajam draws influence from various forms of "people's" music including that of ceremonial and ritualistic practices, the music of work, religious passion-plays and music related to traditional sport. Where relevant, Ajam seeks to utilise native roots-based forms of vocal performance such as Bahr-e-Taveel and ZarbyKhāni' in preference over borrowed forms such as Rap.

== Naming ==
In various interviews with the members of Ajam, several reasons are cited for the naming of the project. In many countries that neighbour Iran, Ajam is a surrogate term for Persian or Iranian. Other notable definitions for ajam are rooted from an Arabic term to mean, "illiterate", "mute", or "ineloquent".

With reference to the latter definitions, and in relation to the naming of the project, Amin Ajami is quoted as saying that “we would rather be illiterate to the language of 'man', but seek fluency in the language of the 'heart'".

== Discography ==
=== Albums ===
- Raghse Mardooneh (2010) - independent release in London and online including physical and digital music sales platforms
- Rag o Risheh (2016) - released for physical and digital distribution in Iran through Naghmeye Haft Eqlim with independent release worldwide via various major online music distribution platforms

=== Singles ===
- "Noroozkhāni" (2011)
- "Beshkan" (2011)
- "Shahmirzādi" (2012)
- "Oomadam" (2013)
- "Bāyrām" (2014)
- "Dare Vāz Kon" (2015)

=== Music videos ===
- "Bandare Landan" (2011) - filmed in London by Late November Productions, sponsored by Beshkan with thanks to APARAT Media (2011);
- "Noroozkhāni" (2011) - filmed in London by Late November Productions, sponsored by Beshkan with thanks to APARAT Media (2011);
- "Khezān" (2012) - filmed in London by Late November Productions, directed by Mehrdad Azmin. Motion graphics by Lee Cooper and additional Camera credits to Borna Izadpanah;
- "Oomadam" (2013) - filmed and produced in London by APARAT Media in 2012 (released in February 2013) featuring Masoud Nili (Taxi Tehran) and a cameo appearance from London-based rapper Reveal;
- "Gole Irān" (2014) - Compilation of footage shot by fans and friends of Ajam from many different countries around the world including Iran, UK, USA, Canada, Germany, Kuwait, Mexico, Sweden and Malaysia in support of the Iranian national football team at the 2014 World Cup in Brazil. The director and main editor of the clip is Farshad Hosseini with colour and graphics by Yousef Salehizadeh.
- "Zoghālchi" (2015) - Filmed and edited in London by Farshad Hosseini and Ajam with additional camera credits being given to Bahareh Hosseini;
- "Dare Vāz Kon" (2015) - Featuring Mehdi Boostani and Tannaz Zand; a compilation of practice sessions filmed by Bahareh Hosseini in London and edited by Mina Fouladi and Amin Ajami.
