= Shadmehr Aghili =

Iranian songwriter and musician (born 1973)

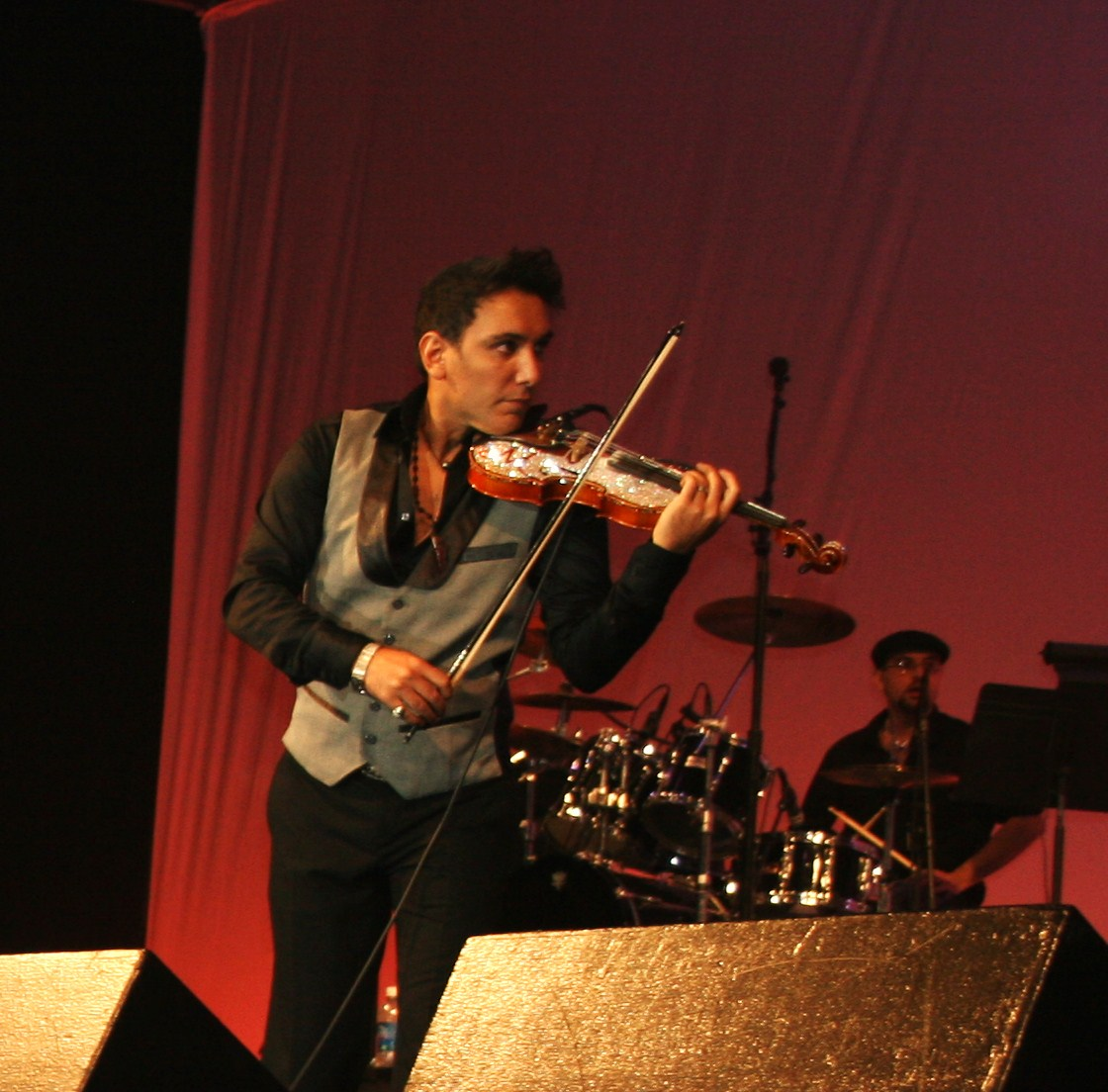
- Aghili in concert Los Angeles 2009
- Born: Shadmehr Aghili; January 27, 1973 (age 53); Tehran, Iran.
- Occupations: Singer; Musician; Composer; Arranger; Actor
- Years active: 1988–present
- Spouse: Mia Mesa (m. 2011)
- Musical career
- Genre: Iranian pop music
- Labels: Tanin Soat; Pagham Sahar; FarsNava; Avay Navin; HamAvaz; Nova Media; Century Records; Avang Music
- Formerly of
- Website: shadmehrmusic.com

Signature
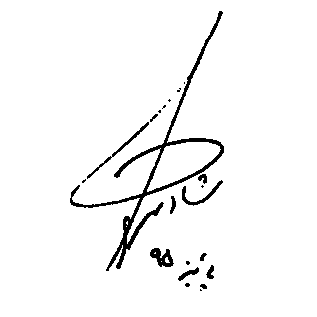

Shadmehr Aghili (Persian: شادمهر عقیلی) (born 29 February 1972) is an Iranian songwriter, composer, arranger, singer, musician, music producer and actor who began his career by releasing several music albums in Iran. After a while, he immigrated first to Canada and then to the United States of America, where he continued his artistic activity.

== Life ==
Shadmehr Aghili was born on 27 January 1973 in Tehran. He graduated from the music program at the Tehran Conservatory of Music and began his artistic career during childhood. His interest in music developed after watching his brother play musical instruments, and at the age of 16, he entered the world of music by playing the piano. After entering the conservatory, he began playing the trumpet and later chose the violin as his primary instrument.

As he continued his artistic career, Aghili also learned to play the bass guitar. In an interview, he stated that he had taught himself to play the instrument using educational resources on YouTube.

== Artistic career ==
=== Beginning work at IRIB and release of his first album, My Spring ===
In 1995, he joined the music department of the Islamic Republic of Iran Broadcasting (IRIB) and began working there, although his works faced difficulties in obtaining official licenses. He performed "Mabood" as his first work, followed by "Fasl-e Ashenayi", and subsequently released My Spring , his first cassette album. My Spring was an instrumental album consisting of old songs such as "Gol-e Gandom", "My Spring", "Jan-e Maryam", and others. Shadmehr was responsible for the arrangements and played the piano, guitar, and violin on the album.

He later contributed three songs to an album titled Fasl-e Ashenayi, which also featured works by other Iranian pop singers of the time: "Bagh-e Zendegi", performed with Alireza Assar, "Mabood", and "Fasl-e Ashenayi". He subsequently contributed two songs, "Ghafas" and "Ta Bi-Nahayat-e Shab", to an album titled Nazanin, again alongside other singers.

=== Mosafer album ===
Shadmehr Aghili's second album, Mosafer, which is considered his first vocal album, was released in 1998 by the cultural and artistic company "Payam-e Sahar", with the collaboration and input of Behrouz Safarian. The album received a very positive reception and became one of the best-selling albums released in Iran during the 1990s, after the Iranian Revolution.

=== Dehati album and its controversy ===
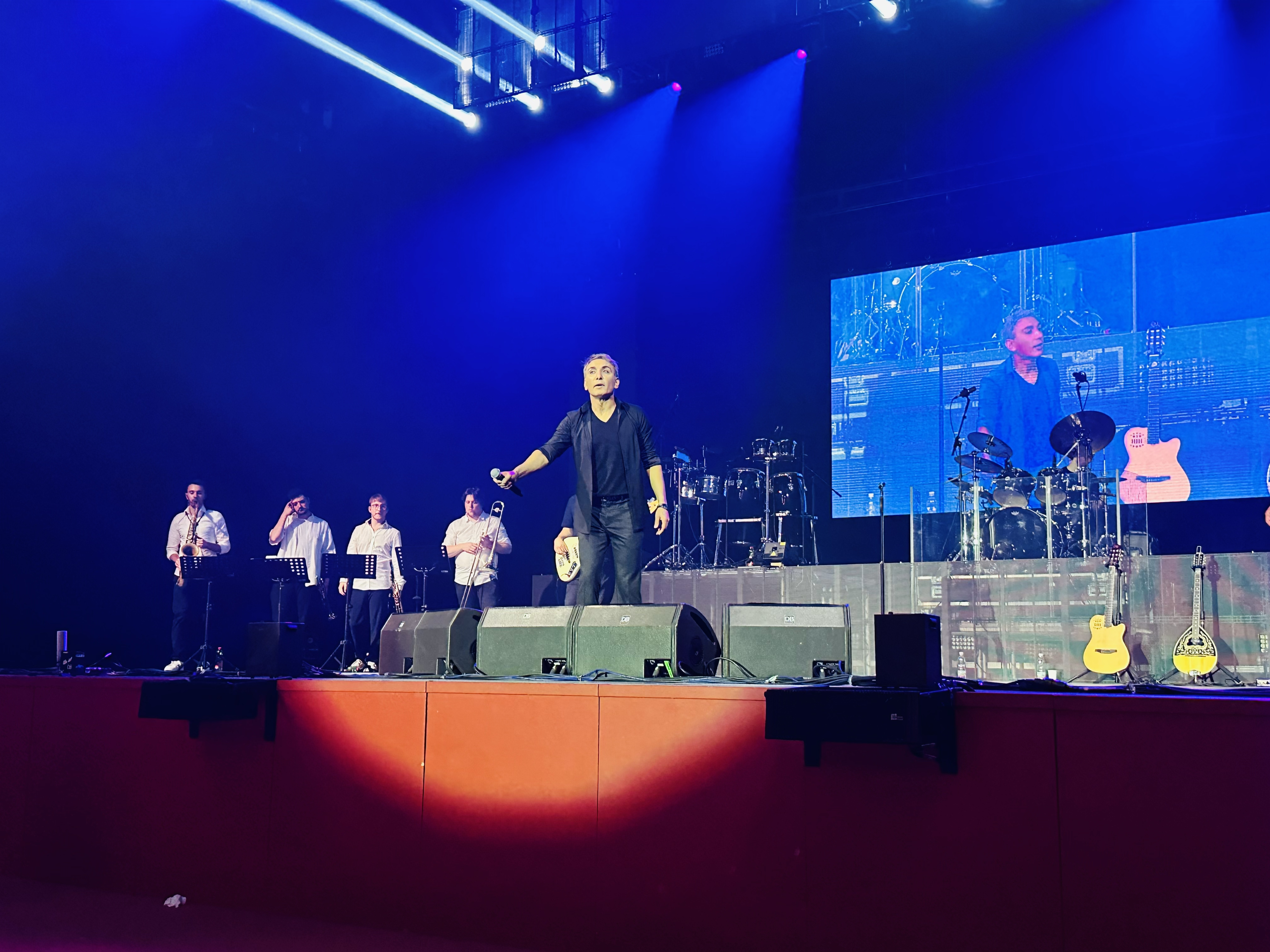
Shadmehr Aghili in Vienna, November 2023

Dehati, Aghili's next album, was released by the cultural and artistic company Fars Nava. The album's distributor encountered obstacles in obtaining a release permit from the Ministry of Culture and Islamic Guidance, requiring Aghili to repeatedly re-record and revise several of the album's songs before approval was granted.

The album is widely regarded as having had a significant impact on Iranian pop music following the Iranian Revolution. According to multiple sources, Dehati is the best-selling album in the history of Iranian pop music after the 1979 Iranian Revolution.

In January 2014, after a 14-year hiatus, the album was reissued by Iran Gam with a redesigned cover.The reissue generated considerable controversy. In addition, the newspaper Kayhan and the Fars News Agency published strongly critical articles opposing the album's re-release.

Media criticism from Iran's conservative political faction targeting Shadmehr Aghili and the re-release of Dehati by Iran Gam during the tenure of Ali Jannati as Minister of Culture and Islamic Guidance received widespread coverage in Persian-language media within Iran.

In May 2014, on the fifteenth anniversary of the album's release, Aghili's official Facebook page stated that Dehati had sold approximately 10 million copies, describing it as the best-selling Iranian pop album released after the 1979 Iranian Revolution.

=== Mashq-e Sokoot ===
Mashq-e Sokoot is an instrumental album by Shadmehr Aghili, released in 1999. It consists primarily of instrumental versions of songs from his album Mosafer.

=== Naghmehaye Sharghi ===
Naghmehaye Sharghi is an instrumental album by Shadmehr Aghili, released in 1999.
