= Iranian jazz =

Music genre and scene

Iranian jazz refers to jazz music composed by Iranian musicians, sometimes combined with traditional Iranian elements.

== History ==
=== Early years ===
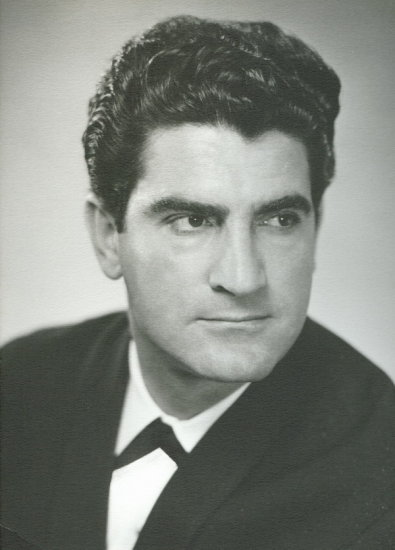
Viguen, Iran's "Sultan" of pop and jazz music.

Jazz music emerged in Iran along with the development of western influences into the pop music. One of the pioneers of jazz music in Iran was Alfred Lazaryan, a little-known singer and dancer whose first recorded song made a hit on the Iranian national radio. However, Lazaryan soon gave up singing. Viguen Derderian, a celebrated pop and jazz artist popularly known simply as "Viguen", began his career in the early 1950s. Viguen's first song, Moonlight, which was released in 1954, was also an instant hit on the radio, and is considered to have marked a turning point in Iran's western-influenced music. Viguen created some of Iran's most memorable songs, including collaborations with Delkash, and was known as Iran's "Sultan of Jazz".

=== After the 1979 Revolution ===
A music group named Ejazz performed the first officially sanctioned jazz music concert in post-revolutionary Iran. They produced jazz fusion, incorporating elements from the indigenous classical music.

Rana Farhan, an Iranian jazz and blues singer living in New York, combines classical Persian poetry with modern jazz and blues. She has established a model to the jazz fusion project that she continues to incorporate in her work. Her best-known work, Drunk With Love, is based on a poem by prominent 13th-century Persian poet Rumi.

Bomrani, one of the first country blues bands in post-revolutionary Iran, was founded in 2008, as part of a new wave of influences onto the music stages of Tehran. Pallett, a similarly successful band that was formed in 2009, composes jazz fusion of clarinet, cello, and double bass. They have garnered a huge following in Iran, and have also performed abroad.

== Samples ==
Man Mast o To Divāne
A sample of the song Man Mast o To Divāne by Rana Farhan.

== See also ==
- Music of Iran
