= Music of West Africa =

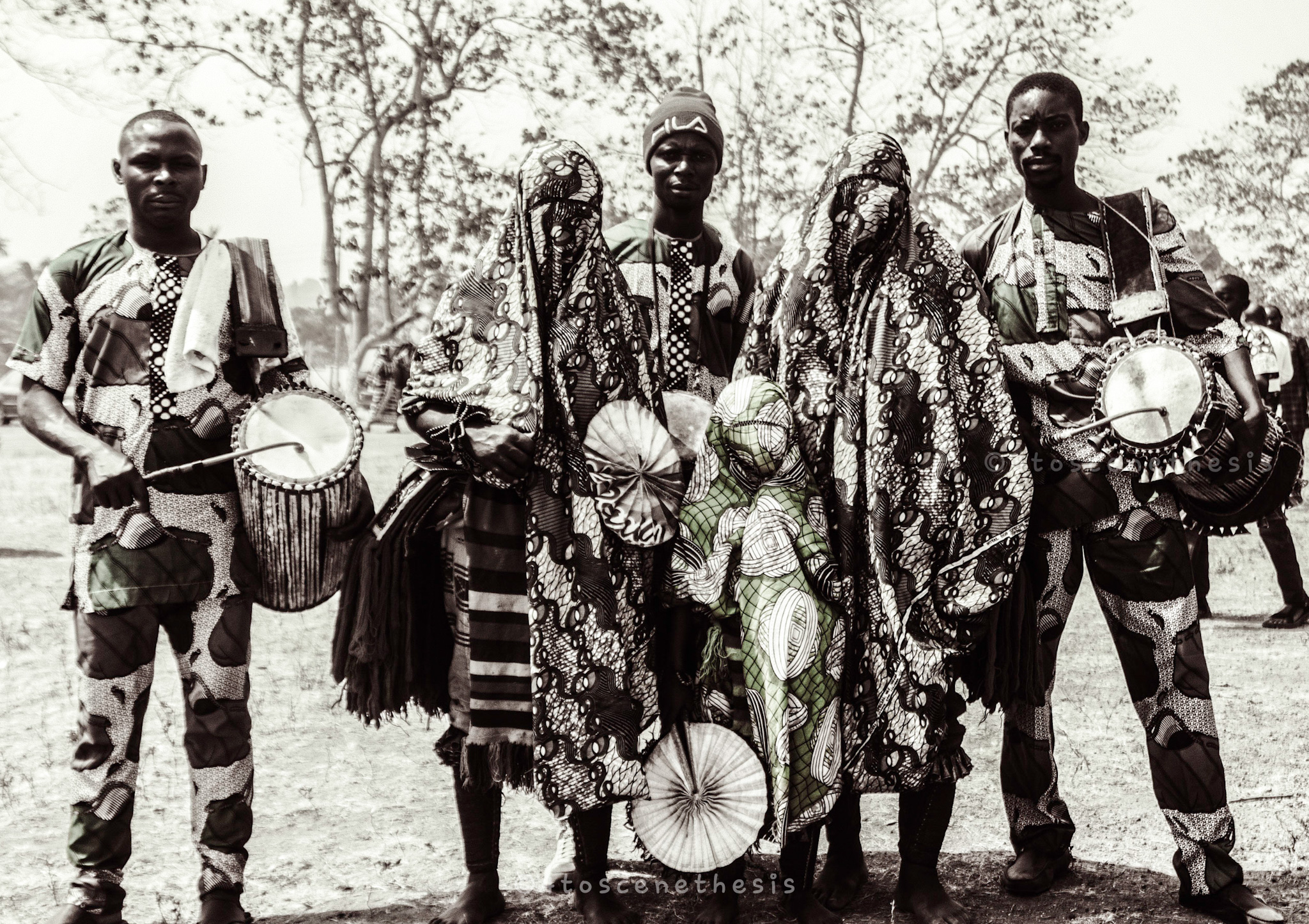
Yoruba musicians

The music of West Africa has a significant history, and its varied sounds reflect the wide range of influences from the area's regions and historical periods.

Traditional West African music varies due to the regional separation of West Africa, yet it can be distinguished by two distinct categories: Islamic music and indigenous secular music. The widespread influence of Islam on culture in West Africa dates back to at least the 9th century, facilitated by the introduction of camels to trade routes between the North of Africa and West Africa. Islam-influenced West African music commonly includes the use of stringed instruments like the goje, while more secular traditional West African music incorporates greater use of drums such as the djembe.

Contemporary styles of music in West Africa have been influenced by American music, African jazz and gospel music. The forced migration of Africans to the Americas as a result of the transatlantic slave trade gave rise to kaiso music, which has influenced the sounds of Calypso, a style with major popularity throughout West Africa.

Griots, also known as 'wandering musicians', have traditionally been a major part in the distribution of music throughout West Africa, as their purpose is to spread oral tradition through musical storytelling. The role of griots remains significant in preserving smaller ethnolinguistic groups' cultures.

== Popular music ==
The sounds of popular music throughout West Africa are comparable to a combination of Western, Latin American and traditional African music. Genres such as Highlife, Afro-Calypso and African Jazz reflect this fusion and have developed upon these styles' sounds.

Highlife is an upbeat, multi-instrumental and jovial style of music which is sung in many regional languages including Igbo, Yoruba and Ewe. Ghanaian music scholar V. Kofi Agawu (2006) writes: "Highlife is invested with a bundle of attributes that include personal and communal pride, stateliness, self-satisfaction, and a strategic complacency". Highlife is rarely sung in English. The original form of highlife holds its origins in Ghana, however most regions that have adopted highlife music compose their own variations on its sounds, altering the pace, instrumentation and lyrics. E.T. Mensah and E.K. Nyame were two Ghanaian musicians who pioneered the Highlife genre, gaining major popularity and acclaim throughout their careers.

Highlife is regularly played by big bands composed of a wide variety of instruments. The prevalence of modern, typically European instruments in large highlife bands dates back to the 19th century; when the Gold Coast was established, European missionaries and merchants brought with them accordions, brass instruments, guitars and harmonicas. The sounds of these instruments combined with the more traditional drum-focused music of West Africa to create the fusion that is highlife. A major factor in highlife's increase in popularity during the mid-20th century was the desire to raise spirits after World War Two.

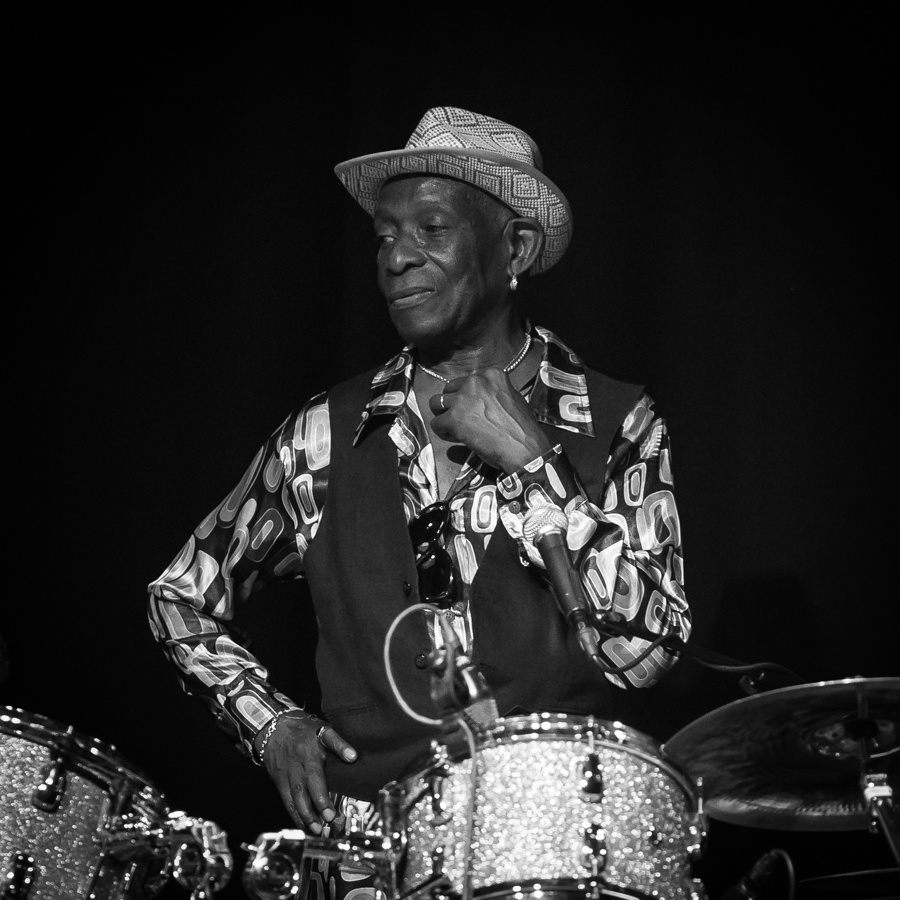
Afrobeat drummer Tony Allen in 2015

Calypso music remains popular throughout West Africa. Developed from West African kaiso, the sounds of calypso are similar to those of highlife, however the two differ slightly in lyrics and instrumentation. Lyrics in highlife are generally repeated more than those in calypso songs, despite the two genres' subject matter remaining similar - both are commonly about romantic relationships and desire.

Many genres and styles of music popular throughout the Caribbean and French Antilles have their roots in West Africa due to transatlantic slave trading under various European colonial empires. This involved mass transportation of West African people such as the Ewe and the Yoruba, who took with them the distinct sounds of their musical culture.

Afrobeat is a music genre with major popularity throughout West Africa. Originating in Nigeria in the early 20th century, Afrobeat grew in popularity in the 1960s. This growth was mainly due to the considerable fame of Fela Kuti, the ‘Father of Afrobeat’, and other pivotal artists such as Tony Allen and Ebo Taylor. Afrobeat is influenced by palm-wine music and Ghanaian highlife, as well as jazz, funk and fuji. Fela Kuti devised the term 'Afrobeat' as early as 1968 in his home country of Nigeria.

Afrobeat music is characterised by multi-instrumental bands playing a jazz and funk-inspired groove with a focus on guitar riffs and horn sections. The lyrics have historically been political in nature, with Fela Kuti's lyrics covering topics from black power to dictatorship. The earlier sounds of Afrobeat have influenced Western artists such as British producer Brian Eno and American rapper Talib Kweli, while American EDM group Major Lazer are known for the regular inclusion of rhythms inspired by Afrobeat in their music.

Afrobeat is commonly confused with Afrobeats, the latter being a more general term used to describe popular contemporary music throughout West Africa. A distinct trait of Afrobeats’ sound is its focus on drum rhythms, commonly made electronically. Davido, Wizkid, Burna Boy Tekno are highly popular West African Afrobeats artists.

== Development in music of West Africa ==
The land masses of West Africa and Sub-Saharan Africa are massive thus showing the diverse musical heritage, cultural vibrance and historical depth. These lands have a significant role in the continent’s overall well-being. Over many centuries, culture has changed due to evolution and many other internal and external effect and so has the changed. These changes have served as a mirror to the entire region’s culture, politics, economies and also religious practices. Music has evolved from the traditional rhythms, drumming and general instrumentation to a modern contemporary version. This has included fusion of the traditional and contemporary rhythms. The evolution has also been caused by various interactions between the local and foreign people especially during the colonial era. Having a better understanding of this evolution and development of music of this region helps one to have profound insights on the complexities of the music and cultural development of the region.

Sub-Sahara region refers to the region that lies south of the Sahara Desert. They include; Angola, Benin, Mali, Gambia, Cape Verde, Chad, Guinea, Guinea Bissau and Burkina Faso among others. Countries of West Africa include Nigeria, Niger, Senegal, Sierra Leone, Liberia, Ghana and Togo.

African cultures and their music had a lot of instrumentation and dances since music and dance was and is still considered inseparable. The West African cultures were known for their art and craft in drums and stringed instruments. They had diverse array of instruments including drums such as the Djembe drums, talking drums and sabar among other prominent drum instruments. They also fancied their strengths in making stringed instruments such as the famous Ngoni, balafon and the legendary Kora which will be further discussed later on. They also had quite impressive taste in wind instruments also. During different ages before the colonial rule, the people had their way of transferring their musical knowledge from one generation to the other. This brings us to discuss ways of their information transfer.

Pedagogical methods of transferring music from one generation to another Apprenticeship- This involved a skilled individual teaching their musical skill through hands-on training and observation.

Oral traditions- This was the most common especially among the Griot families of Mali and The Gambia where the practices were transferred orally from generation to generation. This included telling stories of the cultural heritages and music so that it could bond with the people. Rituals and communities- Through certain rituals, generations had to understand the chants, the dance movements and the music performed in the ritual. This automatically made them to know and understand the music.

Mentorship- Kids born to musical families were most influenced by this as they got direct engagement with their parents or relatives which made them have them as musical mentors and they gained their knowledge through practice and advices.

The following are the factors that led to growth and development of music of West Africa and Sub-Saharan Africa:

=== Colonisation ===
Interaction of African people and the foreigners who came as missionaries and soldiers to induce colonial rule, had a very big impact in the growth of the music in general. This led to invention of new musical genres, new musical instruments, fusion of both the traditional African and Western and European musical styles. For example, the Kora instrument was developed and its tuning pegs were crafted into modernized guitar-like tuning pegs. Countries like Equatorial guitar which were colonised by the Portuguese got influenced by the Language and had introduction of the acoustic flamenco guitar that sky rocketed flamenco music in the region. European cultures such as the French who colonised a big portion of the Sub-Saharan region led to introduction of instruments such as the violins, guitar and brass instruments that were incorporated to music. Music such as the Yoruba music using the foreign musical instruments evolved into modern day Afrobeat. ( de Preameneu, J. B. (2020). From colonisation to globalisation (Doctoral dissertation, 서울대학교 대학원).)

== Growth and identity of West African music on global music markets ==
West African music is a version of African music. The sounds and energies that make up the music and a little of language backing has led to an own original Afrobeat genre of music. Afro music is known for its famous log drums and Shekere shakers that play throughout the songs. These instruments have proven to be the masterpiece in music as their timbre is unique and appeals to a larger crowd. The musical recognition has now put African music on the scope of the world and has made local musicians show case their talent to international stages. Consequently, the music has led to increased interest by other people in African countries and oversees countries therefore growth in the industry in general.

== Role of Griots in preserving and transmitting musical tradition ==
Griots also known as the Jali, are traditional West African musicians, storytellers and oral tradition historians. They are responsible for preserving and passing knowledge from one generation to another. Griots were and still are very respectable people in the society as the compose, sing and praise songs that celebrate accomplishments of individuals, families and communities as a whole. Through these people music developed from generation to generation depending on the skill level and expertise of the Griot. With an example given, Sona Jobarteh a famous Gambian Kora player was born in a family of griots which explains her successful career as a female Kora player in a field dominated by male gender.

(Hoffman, B. G. (2017). The Roles of the Griot in the Future of Mali: A Twenty-First-Century Institutionalization of a Thirteenth-Century Traditional Institution. African Studies Review, 60(1), 101-122.)

== Role of women in West African music ==
In the past, instrument playing was mostly restricted for men, while women were given dancing roles. With the new era of music, women have appearing more often as musicians. This has led to development of newer sub-genres of music, new energy and development of new movements both in instrumentations and dance choreography. Today, women have been given vital musical and communal roles such in performance. They act as griots and ensure cultural preservation. Increasingly, women channel their views through music, and they can show their talent by playing instruments and performing and drawing even more women in to music. Women like Sona Jobarteh and Tata Dindin Jobarteh are strong examples of leaders in African music.

== Influence of religion on West African music ==
West Africa, Sub-Sahara Africa and Africa in general during the pre-colonial periods was considered as an outdated region of the world. This was mainly because traditional cultures encouraged rituals and sacrifices. Witchcraft was also prominent in the West African countries. Traditional music also accompanied the religious practices which was condemned by the missionaries and was made to change due to introduction of Islam and Christianity. This shift in religion killed some of the original ritual songs and developed new songs that adhered to the new religious rules. For example, Christianity came with hymn singing and Gospel music that led to abandonment of some musical instruments that were considered demonic.

An example that would further define the music of Sub-Sahara is the Kora music and Kora instrument.

== Kora music ==
Kora is music and also an instrument that is made of a Calabash or gourd resonator, has twenty-one strings, has a long neck that is attached to the resonator and has leather or modern tuning rings or pegs. The player uses both hands to pluck the strings, with both thumbs and index fingers used to create melodies. It produces a sound close to a harp and a lute combined. It’s known for its complex tuning that gives a wide variety of tones across all strings thus producing rich and complex sound. Kora instrument was and still is played by the few chosen skilled maestro players as it requires a lot of mastery for one to be able to play it properly. Kora can be played solo and can also come with an ensemble made of other traditional stringed, percussion and wind instruments. It is tuned to a nonequitonal heptatonic scale system.

Some important players of Kora are Sona Jobarteh, Tata Jobarteh and Toumani Diabaté of The Gambia and Mali respectively.

== Rhythmic structure ==
=== Metre ===
African music can be divided into two broad categories: d

- Danceable music which can be further broken down into;
  - A 12-point set which can be similar to 6/8 music (ex. ••• ••• I ••• •••)
  - A 16-point set which can be similar to 2/4 music (ex. •••• •••• I •••• ••••)

12 point tends to be used for formal occasions while 16 point tends to be more casual

- Music that is not considered danceable which can be further broken down into;
  - A cross-set with a 12-point set with tuplets
  - A cross-set with a 16-point set consisting of triplets

This style is typically reserved for ritual or worship

=== Form ===
West African songs can usually be broken down into two categories:

- The solo part, which
  - Can be heavily altered by the vocalist
  - Tends to not be accented
- The chorus, which
  - Can act as a refrain to the solo part
  - Tends to be accented similar to Western music.

Pitch can affect how the vocal parts are accented:

- High tones are slightly accented
- Low tones have no accent

This accenting is a result of the local languages, where the pitch and accenting can determine what word is being said. Compared to rhythm, melody is unimportant and can be altered at the musicians' discretion.

=== Drum ensemble ===
The drum ensemble is critical in preserving the rhythm of a song. The responsibilities of the ensemble are typically divided into two categories:

- The ostinato – background drummers who focus on maintaining the circular rhythm
- The master drummer - “projects” rhythmic manipulations within the time structure

The master drummer's role can be further divided into;

- Extrapolation and masking set units
- Staggered subsets and supersets
- Set interpolation

=== Artistry of Afro-Cuban Batá Drumming ===
This book shows us into the rich tradition of Afro-Cuban Batá drumming, by showing its aesthetics, transmission methods, the communal bonding it brings, and the creativity it inspires. The Writer Who is Schweitzer examines the rhythms, spiritual significance, and cultural heritage that are in Batá drumming, showing us on its historical roots and contemporary practices. The book also explores how Batá drumming is passed down through generations and its role in strengthening social ties within Afro-Cuban communities. Through this exploration, Schweitzer brings the artistic nuances concept of Batá drumming and its broader significance in both musical and cultural contexts

== Instrumentation ==
=== Percussion ===
==== Djembe ====
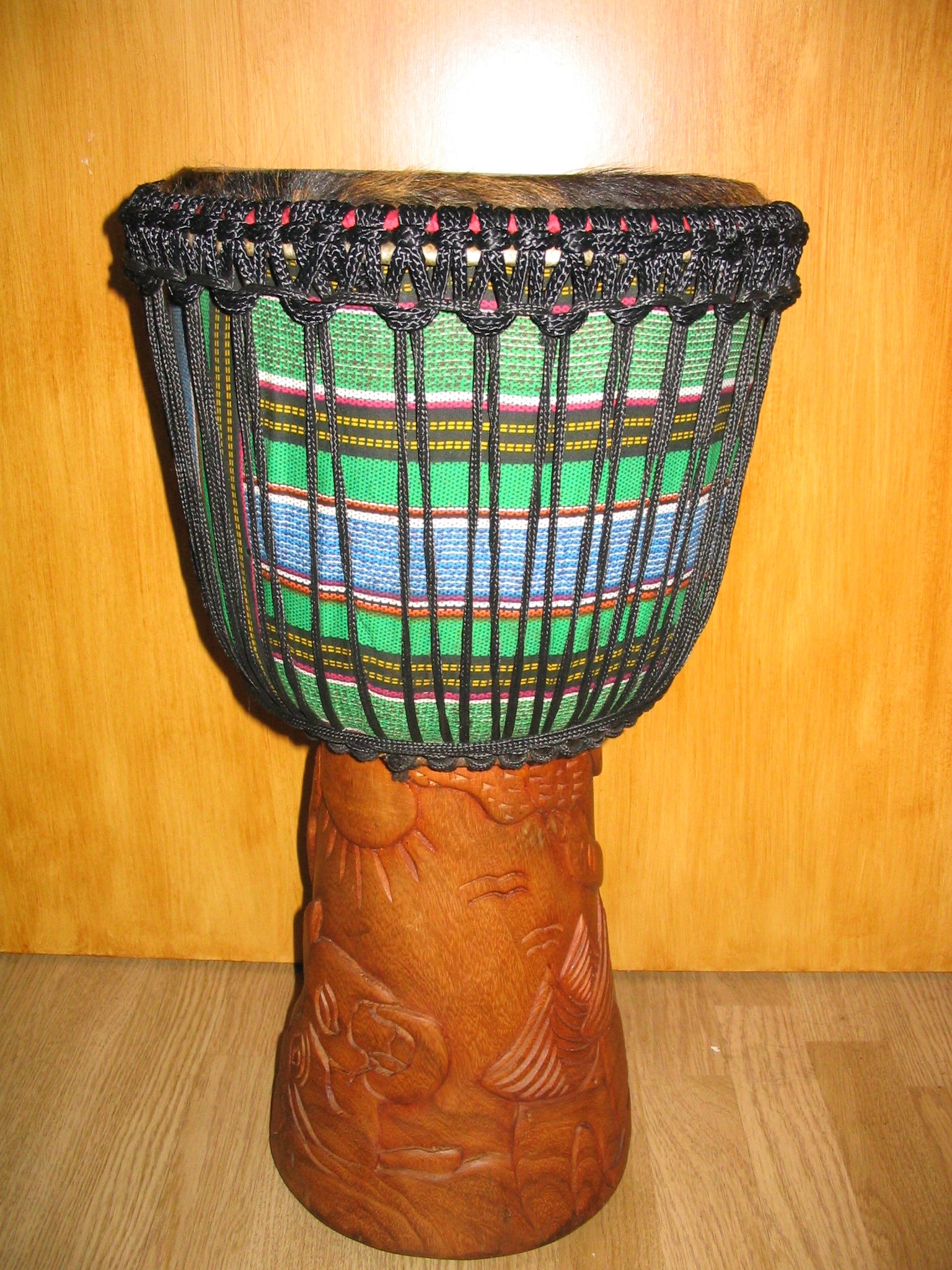
A traditional djembe drum.

Rhythm is the foundation of West Africa's traditional music, so percussion instruments play a major role in constructing its sounds. Traditional music of West Africa incorporates the use of a variety of percussive instruments, the most popular of which is the djembe. Known also as the 'magic drum' or the 'healing drum', the djembe is spiritually important to West African tradition as it is believed that three spirits reside within the drum. These spirits are those of the tree which provided the drum's wooden frame, the animal which gave its skin for the drumhead and the carver or drum assembler.

The sounds of the djembe vary from low-pitched bass sounds (achieved by beating the centre of the drumhead with a flat, outstretched hand) to tone and slap sounds, which have a higher pitch, created by striking the drumhead closer to its edge with only fingertips. The greater tension of the drumhead skin towards the edge of the drum causes this higher-pitched note.

The djembe plays an important role in traditional music as it is seen as a way to communicate emotional experiences in communal situations. The emphasis on the djembe and many other drums as having the ability to 'talk' shows how these drums are valued for their communication purposes.

The sounds of the West African djembe are growing increasingly popular in the Western world. Guinean musician Fodéba Keïta incorporated use of the djembe throughout the 1950s worldwide tour of his dance company, Les Ballets Africains, which performed various traditional West African songs and dances. This considerably increased knowledge of the djembe and other West African instruments throughout Europe and Asia.

Some West African drummers famed for their djembe proficiency are Famadou Konaté, Mamady Keïta, Babatunde Olatunji and Abdoulaye Diakité. These people are what is known throughout Africa as master drummers.

==== Balafon ====
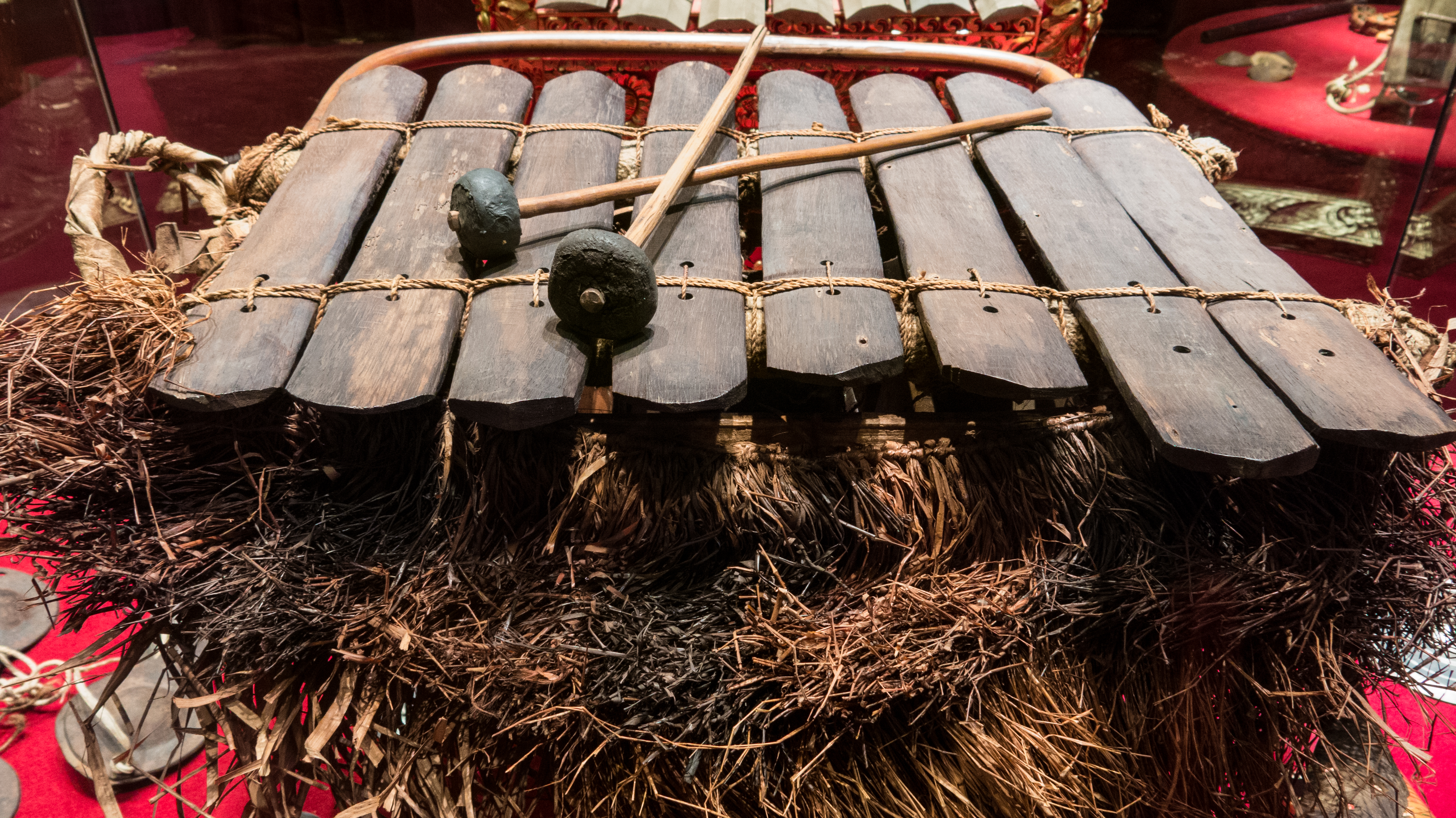
A balafon

The balafon is an instrument similar to the xylophone in Western countries. A member of the idiophone family of instruments, the balafon is used by many Griots and is commonly found in Brikama, a location of great cultural and musical depth. Guinea's Susu and Mandinka peoples also regularly use the balafon in their traditional song and dance.

To create a sound, wooden keys on a bamboo structure are struck with gum-rubber mallets. A balafon typically has 17 to 21 keys, comprising three to four octaves in pentatonic or diatonic tuning. The number of keys on a balafon depends on their width and the desired pitch. Wide keys produce a sound with a low pitch, while narrower keys produce a higher-pitched sound.

An instrument of great cultural significance, the balafon has many complex stories behind it, however many regional narratives state that supernatural beings gifted the balafon and the skills to play it to a specific ancestor. This ancestor then passed the musical knowledge down to younger generations.

Balafon music is considered to be very similar to speaking, as it produces tonalities which are similar to human voices. As a result, the balafon can be used for political or social commentary, replacing lyrics with tones.

=== Stringed instruments ===
Stringed instruments have been an important part of West African music since at least the 14th century, when it was recorded that they were played in a royal ceremony in Mali. Soninke oral traditions indicate that their use goes back further, to the days of the Ghana Empire. There is a variety of stringed instruments throughout West Africa. Common amongst this variety are lutes such as the xalam, harp-lutes like the kora, and fiddles, including the goje.

==== Kora ====
The kora is a stringed instrument originating in The Gambia. It usually has 21 strings, however much like other instruments, there are variations depending on the regional origins of the instrument – it is not uncommon for the kora to have 22 strings in southern Senegal and Guinea-Bissau.

With a body made from calabash and a neck that extends approximately one metre, the kora is stood upright and plucked by a seated player, commonly accompanying lyrics about a person or family. The kora is typically tuned diatonically and has a range of over three octaves.

Papa Susso, Toumani Diabaté and Jaliba Kuyateh are renowned kora players famed for their instrumental proficiency.

==== Xalam ====
The xalam is a lute which has two melody strings and between two and four additional octave strings. The xalam originated with the Wolof people and is often played in pairs, in which one player repeats a musical motif while another tells a narrative. It has a long, wooden body, typically one that is rectangular or in the shape of an oval. A cowhide face is stretched over the body underneath the strings, and a circular hole is cut out towards the bottom of this membrane.

The playing position and method are similar to the ways in which a player would use a guitar, however the left hand, which supports the instrument's neck, is only used to pluck the two melody strings. The other strings can be plucked or strummed, like a kora.

Traditional songs played on the xalam are most often accompanied by lyrics about historical events, commonly the victories of warriors and leaders.

==== Goje ====
The goje is a fiddle with one to two strings, played with a bowstring. Its origins are with the Hausa people, and the goje is culturally significant because of the belief that it is imbued with the ability to communicate with spirits.

Secular performances of goje music take place to celebrate births, marriages and political inaugurations.

== Dance ==
A major element of experiencing West African music, both traditional and contemporary (especially gospel music), is physical expression through dance. Dances are commonly named after the musical tunes which they follow, such as Yankadi, which originated in Southwest Guinea. This is a slow dance which has an emphasis on seduction; two rows of men and women face one another and dance with an emphasis on eye contact and 'touching each other's hands and heart region'. This develops into Makru, a faster-paced element of this courting dance which is danced separate from one's partner.

In many regions in West Africa, traditional dance is considered to be a part of language, a way to translate and communicate experiences. Dance is also a way by which different linguistic and cultural groups can represent and distinguish themselves. For example, the Mbalax dance is a significant cultural hallmark of Senegal, and the Bata dance is traditional to the Yoruba people of Southwest Nigeria.

Most traditional dances throughout West Africa are designated to a specific gender, requiring careful practice and coordination in order for a dancer to fully express the meaning behind a given dance. For example, the Mbalax dance holds its origins as a part of ndut rite of passage ceremonies and is thus traditionally valued as a sacred process.

== Countries ==
- Music of Benin
- Music of Burkina Faso
- Music of Cape Verde
- Music of The Gambia
- Music of Ghana
- Music of Guinea
- Music of Guinea-Bissau
- Music of Ivory Coast
- Music of Liberia
- Music of Mali
- Music of Mauritania
- Music of Niger
- Music of Nigeria
- Music of Senegal
- Music of Sierra Leone
- Music of Togo

== General references ==
- Coester, M. (2008). Localising African Popular Music Transnationally: 'Highlife-Travellers' in Britain in the 1950s and 1960s. Journal of African Cultural Studies, 20(2), 133–144.
- Agawu, V. K. (1987). The Rhythmic Structure of West African Music. The Journal of Musicology, 5(3), 400–418.
- Robotham, D. K. (18 January 2002). African music. Retrieved 19 March 2021, from https://www.britannica.com/art/African-music
- Nketia, J. (1957). Modern Trends in Ghana Music. African Music, 1(4), 13–17.
