= Radiodiffusion Télévision Sénégalaise =

Senegalese public broadcasting company

Radiodiffusion Télévision Sénégalaise (RTS)
- Type: Broadcast television network
- Country: Senegal
- Availability: National; international
- Founded: 1950 (radio), 1965 (television)
- Motto: "Une fenêtre dans le monde" ("A window in the world")
- Official website: http://www.rts.sn
- Language: French

Radiodiffusion Télévision Sénégalaise (RTS) is the Senegalese public broadcasting company.

== History ==
The French military opened the first radio broadcasting station in Dakar in 1932. It began broadcasting civilian programming in 1939. The origins of RTS are in Radio-Dakar, created in 1950, that broadcast eight hours per day. In 1951 two channels appear: Dakar Inter and Dakar Afrique, broadcast to listeners across western Africa.

In 1959, the fusion of Mali and Senegal into the Mali Federation causes the creation of Radio Mali, its bases being in Radio Inter. On August 20, 1960, when Senegal separated from the Mali Federation, Radio Mali became Radio Senegal with two channels: one national and the other international.

An unnamed Radio Senegal engineer making a field recording of a UNESCO-sponsored functional literacy class for co-operative farmers in the city of Khenene in 1971

In 1962, Radio Senegal became the flagship member of the Union of African National Television and Radio Organizations and its successor, the African Union of Broadcasting.

In February 1965, the Senegalese government began its first television broadcasts, with health and nutrition programmes. Experimental programmes came to an end in 1969. However, the Munich Olympics created a demand that incited the Senegalese government to create an institution producing both television and radio broadcasts. The Office de Radiodiffusion Télévision du Sénégal (ORTS) was created in 1973, operating two radio channels and a national television channel (channel 7 in Dakar).

The programme Chossanie Senegambia ... has a higher audience in the Gambia and Senegal than any other programme broadcast by ORTS and Radio Gambia. It is the only programme that goes into the people's own culture and tell them about the history of their ancestors.

— Alhaji Alieu Ebrima Cham Joof,

On 4 October 1973, ORTS which had been in talks with Radio Gambia about producing a joint radio programme based on Senegambian history and broadcast in the local languages came to an agreement, and the first ever recording of the programme Chossani Senegambia (the history of Senegambia) was made. The Gambian team consisted of veteran broadcasters like Alhaji Alieu Ebrima Cham Joof (historian, former Director of Programmes and Head of Local Languages at Radio Gambia), Alhaji Assan Njie (Presenter of Radio Gambia), Alhaji Mansour Njie (historian and Presenter of Radio Gambia, later Presenter of Gambia Radio & Television Service (GRTS) and Alhaji Ousman Secka. Alhaji Alieu Ebrima Cham Joof (Coordinator of the program for Radio Gambia) travelled to various parts of Senegal and the Gambia accompanied by his team of journalists including Cheickh Jallow, to interview the elders knowledgeable in Senegambian history. The Senegalese team also went to the Gambia to gather materials. Their team included: Ebrima Mbenga (Coordinator of the program for ORTS), Dodou Diego Diop and Alioune Cissé. The programme was pre-recorded and it was scheduled by both Radio Stations to go live at the same time and date (Tuesdays), so that both Gambian and Senegalese listeners can listen to it at the same time. On many occasions, prominent Senegalese historians made live appearances at Radio Gambia studios and vice versa. The programme was generally accompanied by live music from prominent griots like Jali Nyama Suso, Alhaji Bai Konte (on Kora also griot), Alhaji Abdoulaye Samba (or Abdulai Samba, on Xalam also griot) and backing singers. Some of the prominent historians from Senegal that appeared on the programme included: El Hadji Demba Lamin Diouf, Modou Diouf (also known as Captain Modou Diouf - special appearance at Radio Gambia, 1979), El Hadji Mansour Gueye and Gorgi Makura Mboob. From the Gambia they included: Dodou Nying Koliyandeh, Jabell Samba, Alhaji Babou Samba, Alhaji Bamba Suso, Doctor Lamin Mbaye, Alhaji Momodou Lamin Bah and Alhaji Sait Camara. The programme was a success in both Senegal and the Gambia, because no programme like that existed before in neither country.

In 1992, the ORTS changed its name to the Société Nationale de Radiodiffusion Télévision Sénégalaise (RTS) also changing its structure from government direction to a publicly funded, independently managed corporation.

RTS1 introduced a new schedule in July 2001. Among the changes were the increase of news editions in French from two to three, 12 hours of programming on weekdays, 14 on Wednesdays and 15 on weekends (extending past midnight) and improved sports programming. At the time of the new schedule, RTS had bought a package of 52 feature films, mostly American and released less than two years before showing.

RTS is member of the African Union of Broadcasting (AUB).

== Services ==
=== Radio ===
The RTS operates multiple national and regional FM radio stations.

=== Television ===
The RTS operates five nationwide television channels, RTS1 and RTS2 in French, and the language channels RTS 3, RTS 4 and RTS 5. RTS 3, from Tambacounda, launched on 6 April 2013; RTS 4, from Ziguinchor, in April 2014, covering the Casamance region; and RTS 5, out of Matam, in 2021. There was going to be an RTS 6, from Diourbel, planned in the early stages of digital terrestrial television, but was likely scrapped.

== Bibliography ==
Joof, Alhaji Alieu Ebrima Cham. "Senegambia - The land of our heritage." (1995). pp 7–12
