= Bai Konte =

Gambian musician and storyteller (1920–1983)

- Also known as: Alhaji Bai Konte (after his pilgrimage to Mecca) also Alhaji Bai Konteh
- Born: Bai Konte; 1920; The Gambia
- Died: 1983 (aged 62–63) Brikama, Sanchaba, the Gambia
- Genres: West African (World music, Folk music)
- Occupations: Singer, genealogist, Kora player, historian,
- Instrument: kora
- Years active: 1973 to 1983
- Formerly of: Dembo Konte, Malamin Jobarteh, Chossani Senegambia (a joint program between Radio Gambia and Radio Senegal)

Alhaji Bai Konte (1920–1983) was a jali (praise singer) from Brikama, Gambia. He was born to a West African jali family. He was featured in several educational materials about West African music and Mandinka society, and was one of the first kora players to tour North America, helping to make the kora more widely known.

== Biography ==
Bai Konte's grandfather, Jali Ndaba Konteh, was a Konting player who originally brought his family to Brikama, Gambia, from the Kankaba region of Mali. Bai Konte's father, Burama Konte, was also a celebrated kora player and composed several important pieces in the repertoire. Burama Konte, composed the anthem of the 19th century Senegambian hero Mansumaneh Yundum, Yundum N'ko. It was from that piece that the anthems of Sheriff Sidi Hydara and Nyansu Mbasse originated. Burama Konteh was a well-known kora player of his generation.

Bai Konte was a regular on Radio Gambia and Radio Senegal's joint program called Chossani Senegambia (the history of Senegambia) in the 1970s. He and other griots such as Jali Nyama Suso and Alhaji Abdoulaye Samba (on xalam) used to play live music during the show. Bai Konteh had narrated many epics on that show including the epic of King Abdou Njie and his griot and advisor Ibra Faye. Prominent broadcasters of that show included Alhaji Alieu Ebrima Cham Joof, Alhaji Assan Njie and Alhaji Mansour Njie.

Raised as a hereditary griot, Bai Konte played the 21-string kora and is believed to have been the first kora player to perform and tour in the United States as a soloist, playing at the 1973 Newport Jazz Festival. (Les Ballets Africains, a dance and music group from Guinea, had first performed in the U.S. in 1959, and featured a kora player.)

Bai Konte also followed his father's religious vocation as a Marabout, a Muslim spiritual and Koranic advisor. Bai was fluent and literate in Koranic Arabic, spending part of most days studying Koran, praying with visitors seeking his advice and guidance and copying portions of the Koran for amulets and other matters. He sent a son, Alieu, to live with and study Koran from his own Maribout, Sherrifo Hydra of the central mosque in Nouakchott, Mauritania.

His other sons Dembo Konte and Sherrifo Konteh (sic), Bachaba, Mumadu and Malamini Jobarteh, were raised as griots at Konte Kunda in Brikama, Gambia. The Senegambian artist and radio personality Tamsier Joof Aviance is a relative of Jaliba Kuyateh and great-nephew through his mother of Bai Konte. Two LP recordings have been released of Bai Konte with Dembo Konte and Malamini Jobarteh (Ma Lamin Jobarteh). Jali Sherrifo Konteh has released two CDs, 'Mansalou' and 'Chesano', and tours the UK most years.

Oliver Franklin and Marc Pevar coproduced an award winning 16mm color film, Alhaji Bai Konteh, narrated by Taj Mahal, documenting his role in Mandinka society. The film was purchased by more than 100 film international film libraries. Susan and Marc Pevar produced an annotated 35mm slide and audio show Making The Kora, with writings and a teachers guide, documenting Konte making Marc Pevar's kora. African Arts Magazine published Susan Pevar's recounting of the kora making process, and Sing Out! magazine published her article discussing the kora and its music, complete with a acetate recording of a Bai Konte performance. All of these educational materials, combined with multiple regional and national television and radio feature programs introduced Bai Konte and the kora to the North American audience.

Bai Konte was the first Gambian griot to introduce the kora and Mandinka musical culture to the world audience. In 1973, Bai Konte introduced the kora to audiences in North America. He performed at some of the largest festivals in North America, appeared multiple times on National Public Radio and Television, was interviewed and reviewed by many newspapers. Appearances included the Newport Jazz Festival, the Philadelphia Folk Festival, the National Festival of American Folklife in Washington, DC, Mariposa Folk Festival in Toronto, CA, Fox Hollow Folk Festival, the Alternative Center for International Arts, the American Harp Association, Franklin and Marshal College, Lincoln University, venues in Boston, Philadelphia, appearances on NPR's Fresh Air hosted by Terry Gross; KYW-TV in Philadelphia; WBAI-FM in combination with Pete Seeger; Clearwater Folk Festival and fund raising events; The University of Pennsylvania; house concerts, newspaper interviews and reviews and more.

The touring was facilitated by scores of forward-thinking music lovers including: Gene Shay, Dr. Kenneth Goldstein, Paula Ballan, Robert Browning, Pete and Toshi Seeger, Ralph Rinzler, Alan Jabbour and Joe Hickerson, Kurt Wittig, Dr. Anthony King, Harold Gunn, Terry Gross, Mary Cliff, Malcolm Poindexter, Arthur Hall, Oliver Franklin, Dr. Peter Weil, Dr. Rodrick Knight, Dr. Marvin Wachman, Dr. Tom Hale and many others.

Rounder Records of Somerville, MA released Bai Konte's first LP record, which immediately received a rave review by the New York Times world-famous music critic, Robert Palmer. Major newspapers gave similar reviews for performances. As a result of his appeal to audiences, both live and national mass media, the kora became known for the first time, whereas before only a handful of ethnomusicologists were aware of the kora and its traditions.

About a year before Bai Konte toured North America in 1973, a close friend of Bai Konte, Jali Nyama Suso, was invited to the USA for a residency at Oberlin College Conservatory by Dr. Rodrick Knight, who created a kora ensemble and produced valuable books, recordings, articles and videos, and who elevated the visibility of the kora in international academic circles, as did Dr. Erik Charry.

Dr. Anthony King, Manding studies professor at London University's world-famous School of Oriental and African Studies, toured portions of West Africa, recording and interviewing many kora playing griots. By chance, his work came to the attention of the most important figure in starting the chain of events that introduced the kora to the World Stage, Harold Gunn. Gunn was an anthropology professor at Lincoln University, a graduate of London School of Economics, and father of Susan Pevar (wife of the author of these historic paragraphs, Marc Pevar), who earned her BA in anthropology, Bryn Mawr College.

In 1970, Harold Gunn, an anthropologist specializing in West Africa, traveled in Gambia, Senegal, Ivory Coast and Mali to collect handcrafted physical artifacts. In Gambia he unexpectedly crossed paths with Dr. Anthony King, who told Gunn of his unique and groundbreaking project to record and interview kora musicians. Shortly afterwards in Dakar, Senegal, Gunn encountered a kora musician, purchased his instrument and recorded some music. Marc and Susan met Harold Gunn at the airport where Marc Pevar first saw a kora. Marc liked the cassette recording's harp-like yet Piedmont blues style sound, but found the kora impossible to tune or play.

Bryn Mawr College awarded Susan Pevar a grant to study in West Africa. Harold Gunn corresponded with Dr. Anthony King who agreed to consult with the Pevars in London, to help sort out their pending Gambian visit. King recommended living with Konte's extended family where Susan could study child rearing and Marc could learn the kora. King's guidance was invaluable, based on his experienced report that Bai Konte knew more kora songs, arrangements and playing techniques than any other kora musician he met, and was a both honest and a gentleman of high character. During their year in Gambia, Bai Konte repeatedly urged Marc to find a way for him to perform in the USA.

While in Gambia, Marc sent Bai's music to Folkways and Rounder Records, which both offered to release the album. Back in the USA, in early 1973, Marc brought the music to the attention of Gene Shay, USA's leading folk DJ. Through a rapid sequence of referrals, phone calls and meetings, the spectacularly successful first performing tour of a kora soloist in North American was organized within two months with crucial support by Paula Ballan (curator for the Philadelphia Folk Festival), and Toshi Seeger (Pete's wife).

== Legacy ==
Bai Konte's success introduced record companies, promoters, agents and other kora musicians to the potential for a world market for kora music. All kora musicians who tour internationally owe their success to the Alhaji Bai Konte and his supporters, pioneers who together brought the kora onto the World Stage.

In 2019, Bai Konte's grandsons, Jali Bakary Konteh and Pa Bobo Jobarteh asked Marc Pevar to bring them to the USA as he had brought their grandfather and fathers Dembo Konte and Malamini Jobarteh. Their "Following The Footsteps" debut North American tour was postponed because of the COVID-19 pandemic.

Just as George Wein had helped open the gates by inviting Bai to perform at the Newport Jazz Festival in 1973, Quint Davis did the same and invited the grandsons to perform at the New Orleans Jazz and Heritage Festival in 2020 appearing as stars, headlining on the Blues Tent stage.

== Discography ==
- 1973 - Konte, Alhaji Bai. Alhaji Bai Konte: Kora Melodies from The Republic of the Gambia, West Africa. Recorded and produced by Marc D. Pevar; photography and notes by Marc and Susan Pever. Rounder Records 5001. Rereleased by Rounder Records in 1989 as CD and cassette with bonus tracks: "Tara", "Jato", "Tuning The Kora" and "Simbumba".
- c. 1978 - Gambia's Music/La musique de al Gambie/Gambias Musik. Ethnic Folkways Library. Recorded and produced by Marc D. Pevar; introductory notes by Susan Gunn Pevar. [New York City]: Folkways Records FE 4521.
- 1979 - Konte, Alhaji Bai, with Dembo Konte and Ma Lamini Jobate. Gambian Griot Kora Duets. Recorded December 1977 in Dakar, Senegal, and Brikama, the Gambia, by Marc Pevar. New York City: Folkways. Re-released on CD by Smithsonian Folkways Records in 1997; rereleased in vinyl by Smithsonian Folkways Records in 2020

1982 - with Dembo Konte & Malamini Jobarteh, Kora Music and Songs from the Gambia, recorded/produced Ken Day & Lucy Duran, 1982, Virgin Records

- 1989 - Konte, Alhaji Bai. Kora Melodies From the Republic of the Gambia, West Africa. Recorded in 1973 by Marc D. Pevar. Originally released in 1973, and works 1-10 were issued also in 1985 as analog disc (5001). Somerville, Massachusetts: Rounder Records.
- 2001 - Konteh, Sherrifo. Mansalou. Compound Sounds CS01.
- 2005 - Konteh, Sherrifo. Chesano. Compound Sounds CS02.

Note: It is requested that any other commercial releases of Alhaji Bai Konte's music be added to this discography.
