= Adam Doughty =

English musician (born 1958)

- Born: Adam Doughty; 19 April 1958 (age 68); Bath, England
- Education: Land Management from Royal Agricultural College, Cirencester
- Occupations: Kora player, teacher, kora maker
- Years active: 1995–present
- Style: African Classical Music
- Children: 4
- Website: www.thekoraworkshop.co.uk

Adam Doughty is a Kora player, teacher and maker based in the United Kingdom and France as well as Senegal. He began playing the kora in 1991, almost 10 years after seeing Bai Konte and Malamini Jobarteh play at the Commonwealth Institute in London. Doughty first transferred kora kumbengo onto the guitar, before buying a konso (hide ring) kora. He later travelled to the Gambia to study the kora under the late celebrated griot Dembo Konte and his family.

Doughty runs The Kora Workshop with Kath Pickering. They tutor students of the kora and manufacture koras for performers and learners. His eldest son, Josh (who has trained under Toumani Diabaté in Bamako) is a professional kora player and teacher and initially was taught by Adam. His other son Stefan is also a skilled kora player and on occasion both teach with him. In addition his eldest daughter Jess sings and teaches traditional West African songs and plays the kora. The Kora Workshop runs free beginner workshops as part of the WOMAD festival and introduces the kora to hundreds of people there every year. Regular workshops are held in the UK and France.

In 2007 he bought over 4 hectares of wild bush on the outskirts of Kafountine, Senegal. People come from all over the world to spend time there learning the kora. The land has now been extended to almost 7 hectares and has been accepted as a local 'Réserve Forestière', combining his two main interests, the kora and maintaining/restoring wildlife habitats.
