= Kuyateh =

Kuyateh is a surname. Notable people with the surname include:

- Brima Dawson Kuyateh (fl. early 21st century), Sierra Leonean journalist
- Jaliba Kuyateh (born c. 1957), Gambian musician
- Kausu Kuyateh (died 2018), West African kora player
