= Lamin Saho =

Gambian musician

Lamin Saho is a kora player, vocalist, griot, and the leader of the band Roots and Culture. He lives in The Gambia, in West Africa, and he is the oldest son of the Yankuba Saho, who was a griot also.

There are a lot of kora players in The Gambia, but Lamin is very talented and he has the intention to keep the traditional kora music alive, but he has given it a personal touch. He is well known in The Gambia for his music.

== Discography ==
=== Saba Miniamba ===
1. Ebrima Bojang (Lamin Saho)
2. Keba Njouga (Lamin Kuyateh)
3. Mbanilay (Traditional)
4. Miniamba (Traditional)
5. Tumarankeh (Lamin Saho)
6. Kelleh (Lamin Saho)
7. Kaira (Traditional)
8. Saho (Lamin Saho)
9. Njangu Kelelehlu (Traditional)

=== Minimba Live ===
No track list available

=== Jung Kelefa ===
1. Jola Kelefa (Traditional)
2. Dawda Sanneh (Jung Kelefa)
3. Nkana Keleleh (Lamin Saho)
4. Conkoba (Traditional)
5. Mbamba Bojang (Mbaye Konteh)
