= Tasana Camara =

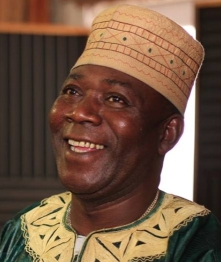

Background information
- Born: Lansana Camara; January 24, 1958 (age 68)
- Origin: Conakry, Guinea
- Occupation: Musician
- Instruments: Kora, Djembe, Balafon
- Years active: 1990s–present

Tasana Camara (born January 24, 1958) is a balafon, djembe, and kora player hailing from Conakry, Guinea in West Africa.

== Career ==
He has performed with the Ballet Senegal, Ballet la Maise, Ballet Djouliba, and the National Ballet of Guinea. He helped found "Group Laiengee" a performing troupe in Guinea composed of children with significant disabilities. In 2008 Tasana and Group Laiengee partnered with Dr. Donald DeVito at The Sidney Lanier Center, a public school in Gainesville, Florida for American students with disabilities. This project was included in the United Nations Compendium on "Music as a Natural Resource" to find ways to make music programs a source of economic opportunity for developing communities around the world. Camara performed at Carnegie Hall in New York City on May 21, 2010 with the Sidney Lanier School Music Ensemble (musicians from both the American School and Group Laiengee). The performance in New York was funded by a grant from the National Endowment of the Arts.

== Recognition ==
He was nominated for and won the Jubilation Foundation's "Community Music Award."

== Personal life ==
He currently resides in Western Pennsylvania, teaches music lessons, and performs at local venues as well as around the rest of the United States.

== See also ==
- Music of Africa
