= Jaliba Kuyateh =

Gambian musician

Jaliba Kuyateh is a Gambian musician. He is well known internationally as the "King of Kora." His music mixes traditional kora beats with modern pop music and is often referred to as "kora pop. " Kuyateh is a former school teacher, a resident of Brikama, and performs extensively abroad.

== Life ==
The name 'Jaliba' means great praise singer or griot in his native Mandinka language. His father, Kebba Sankung Kuyateh, also a renowned Kora player, gave him the name in anticipation of his future greatness. Jaliba was born and raised in Niamina Dankunku to musician parents approximately 61 years ago. He was officially born on April 13, 1957, though there is some controversy as to the exact date he was born as births in his village were not recorded at the time. Through his mother, the late Aja Bakoto Mbye, he is related to the religious Samba family of Hagan Street, Banjul, and in turn, to the late Gambian historians and statesman Alhaji Alieu Ebrima Cham Joof - through his mother Aji Anna Samba and her paternal half-brother the religious leader Alhagie Babou Samba (né. Baboucar Samba) - who is an uncle of Jaliba - as depicted in his track Samben (2011). The mothers of Cham Joof and Jaliba trace descent to two Serer sisters who were princess of Baddibu (namely Tamba Ngoneh and Farimatta Ngoneh, daughters of Ngoneh, Queen of Baddibu). On his mother's side, he is also related to Sainey Basen Njie Samba of Kahone, Saloum - who is the ancestor of Cham's sister-in-law (wife of Cham's younger brother, Alhaji Bai Modi Joof) - the branch of the Samba family he also sang in tribute to in his Samben track.

His paternal grandfather, Wandifeng Jali, was also a famous Kora player of his time. Despite coming from a long line of musicians, getting a formal education took center stage in young Jaliba's life. He started his education at Niamina Dankunku Primary School and later transferred to Pakalinding Primary School. He finished his secondary education at Crab Island Secondary School. He then went on to attend The Gambia College from 1977 until 1980. Growing up, Jaliba was made to practice playing the Kora as a form of punishment for misbehaving. By working hard on this 21-stringed complicated instrument, he developed a love and mastery of the instrument that shines through his music. Paired with his silky smooth voice, Jaliba took Gambian music to new heights.

== Career ==
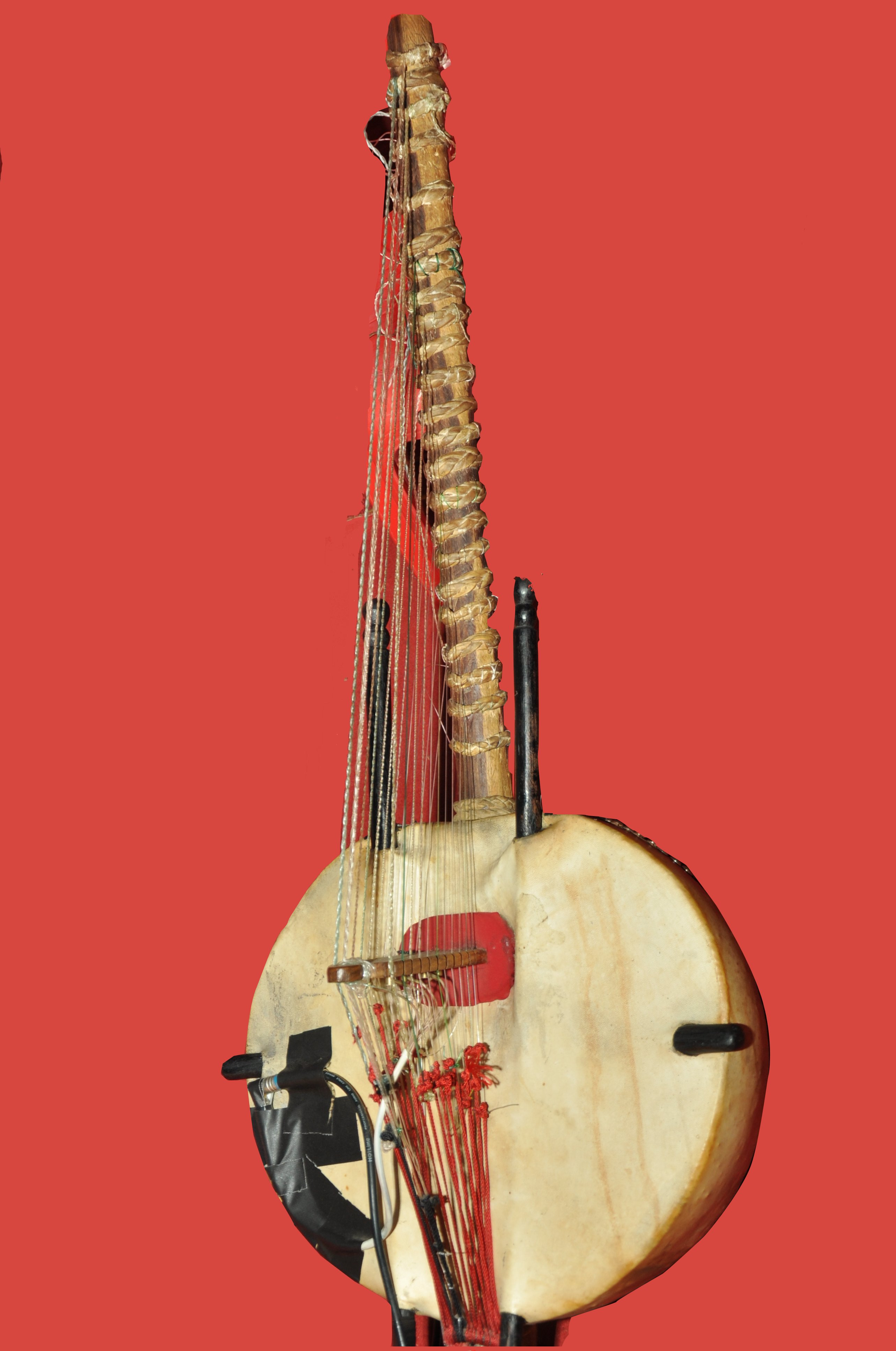
The Kora.

Although he excelled at playing the Kora at a very young age, Jaliba actually started his professional career in education. He taught at Bakau and Brikama Primary Schools. To further his education and become a certified teacher, he attended the Gambia Teacher's Training College while dabbling in music part-time. After graduating from Teacher's college in 1991, he took a position with the ministry of education, youth, sports and culture while continuing to play with his college band "Jaliba and Group". Jaliba had to forgo his government job and become a full-time musician when juggling both became overwhelming. With only two members of his former band joining him, Jaliba formed the Kumareh Band on May 7, 1987. Jaliba and the Kumareh Band then attended The Pan African Festival where they received the Pan African Festival Award in December 1992 in Cape Coast, Ghana. They then proceeded to tour in France and Spain. They released their debut album Radio Kantang in 1993. The band gained even more success the following year, releasing two more albums Dajika and Tissoli. Jaliba's music career spans almost 30 years with his music gaining even more popularity around the world. The band's concerts in the US and Europe are highly anticipated events with huge turnouts.

== Accomplishments and awards ==
Jaliba has received numerous awards and recognition for his music and philanthropic work. He remains the only Gambian appointed a UNICEF Goodwill ambassador for his charitable work with children in the Gambia. On February 17, 2008, Jaliba received the Brufut Marathon Run Association Certificate. Other accolades include Gambia's "Man of the Year" on March 15, 2009, and a Pan African festival award. Jaliba's musical influence is recognized throughout Africa especially in countries where the Mandinka language he sings in is well understood. In 1995, Guinea Bissau granted him honorary citizenship while neighboring country Senegal honored him with the Goodwill Ambassador of Assacase, an Association set up in Senegal by the then First Lady Madame Viviane Wade for Casamance War Victims. Jaliba is a tireless advocate of accessible healthcare for all Gambians. In recognition of his valuable support, the Bansang hospital maternity ward and the APRC General Hospital were named after him. In June 2012 he was awarded a Testimonial Resolution from The Detroit City Council for his civil and musical contributions. In December 2014 Jaliba was appointed as a Goodwill KORA Ambassador for the KORA AWARDS campaign to fight Ebola. In 2023, Jaliba was given an honorary fellowship at Goldsmiths university of London.

== Discography ==
=== Albums ===
- Radio Kankang (1993)
- Dajikah (1994)
- Tissoli (1994)
- Hera Banku (1995)
- Live in America (1995)
- Gambia Third Day (1996)
- Njai Kunda (1998)
- Fan Kanta (1999)
- Best of Jaliba Kuyateh (2000)
- Sosolaso (2009)
- Sabarla (2009)
- Kora Dance (2010)
- Youki (2011)
- Hakatu Mas (2011)
- Tupi Kejang (2012)

== See also ==
- Kora
- Gambian music
- Kouyate family
