= Dembo Konte and Kausu Kuyateh =

Kora players from West Africa

- Origin: Gambia and Senegal
- Genres: World music, folk
- Labels: Rogue, Weekend Beatnik, Xenophile

Dembo Konte (or Konté) (died January 2014) and Kausu Kuyateh (died 16 June 2018) were master kora players from West Africa. They were also singers and, above all, jalis; storytellers and guardians of oral tradition, preserving the history of people and events via their music. Stories and history are passed down from generation to generation by this method within families and groups of friends, ensuring survival of such stories for centuries. The jali sings the praises of his friends and benefactors, warns the politicians of their errors and admonishes the listeners to live right. Their music encapsulates the Mandinka culture.

Konte and Kuyateh took the kora to a new level, having modified their instruments to expand the kora's range by adding extra bass strings to the classic 21 -string harp-like instrument. Roots World described the interplay of the two musicians as "fascinating, as they twist and turn around the melody, fighting against each other and then suddenly forming a unison that shimmers up and down a scale before parting ways again." Their repertoire includes Mamma Manneh, a rolling dance tune from the Wolof tradition and Saliya, one of the oldest songs written for the kora.

Since 1987, they made worldwide tours and their albums have been acclaimed as the most accessible from this tradition. In 1998 journalist and World Music proponent Charlie Gillett stated "Nothing is ever quite the same after the first time you hear a kora played live in a West African setting. Dembo Konte was the musician who opened my ears, and he made these recordings with Kausu Kuyateh soon afterwards. They still sound powerful and raw, evocative and timeless."

Usually performing as a duo, Konte (from The Gambia) and Kuyateh (from Senegal) collaborated with British musicians to create a fusion of West African and western musical styles, retaining the kora and their voices as the primary centres of attention. In 1989 they toured the UK and, on 5 September recorded a session for the John Peel show on BBC radio. They also collaborated that year with Hijaz, Houzam, and Sabah Habas from 3 Mustaphas 3. The main feature of the resultant album (Jali Roll) is the duo's vocals and kora, but once John Kirkpatrick's button accordion comes in, it creates a mood which belongs to neither Europe nor Africa. Track 3 is an old song from Mali, but transformed by boogie-type arrangement. This album was chosen by British music magazines Q and Vox for World Music Album of the Year. When re-issued in 2001, a live track from their London show in 1989 was added.

On the album Jaliology the duo is joined by Mawdo Suso playing balafon, a traditional rosewood instrument resembling a xylophone.

Konte lived in Brikama, in an area of The Gambia noted for its musical traditions and was the son of Alhaji Bai Konte, also a noted kora player and singer in his own right. He also played and recorded with Malamini Jobarteh.

Similarly, Kuyateh came from a family of jali musicians and the tradition continues as a younger generation of the Konte and Kuyateh families take the music and stories to a wider audience through international performances and CDs.

== Discography ==
=== Dembo Konte and Kausu Kuyateh ===
Kairaba Jabi compilation (CD)
Weekend Beatnik WEBE 9032 (1987)

Tracks:

1. Kairaba Jabi
2. Simbomba
3. Ngaleng Sonko
4. Saliya
5. Mamma Maneh
6. Mammadu Sanyang
7. Demba Hajada
8. Banta Toure
9. Yeyengo
10. Tiramakhan
11. Fayinkunko
12. Sunkariba
13. Solo

Simbomba (12" vinyl album)
UK: Rogue Records FMLS2011 (1987) USA: Red House Records RHR27 (1990)

Tracks:

1. Simbomba
2. Ngaleng Sonko
3. Saliya
4. Mamma Manneh
5. Mammadu Sanyang
6. Demba Hejada
7. Banta Toure

Jali Roll (CD)
Weekend Beatnik WEBE 9038 (1990)

Tracks:

1. Alla L'aa Ke
2. President Diawara
3. Lambango
4. Sana Diop
5. Madiba Jabi
6. Amadou Faal
7. Sarah 1
8. Sarah 2
9. Ami N'Diaye
10. Mariama Diallo
11. British

Jaliology with Mawdo Suso (CD)
Xenophile Records (1995)

Tracks:

1. Serifu Sidi Haidara
2. Yussufa Nyabali
3. Alhaji Sidia Diabi Tasilimang
4. Dudu Touray
5. Tunko Darbo
6. Alisewo
7. Adama Ning Nahawa
8. Ke Koto Mani
9. Lambango

Jali Roll (Revisited +1) (CD)
Weekend Beatnik WEBE 9038 (2001)

Tracks: as "Jali Roll", with addition of:

- Sana Diop (Live Bonus Track)

=== Dembo Konté and Malamini Jobarteh ===
Baa Toto (CD)
Wallbank Warwick Communications Ltd WWCD005 (1984)

Tracks:

1. Jato
2. Alla l'Aa Keh
3. Baatoto
4. Cheddo
5. Kumbasora
6. Ten Kulu Kumba Wecho
7. Amadu Faal
8. Fodé Kaba
