= Gambia Radio & Television Service =

National broadcaster of the Gambia

- Type: Broadcast
- Country: Gambia
- Availability: National
- Owner: Government of Gambia
- Official website: http://www.grts.gm

The Gambia Radio & Television Service is the national broadcaster of the West African state of the Gambia. Gambia Radio & Television Service currently broadcasts in English and native local languages.

== History ==
The history of GRTS stems from the merger of the older and more established Radio Gambia and the rather recent Television Channel.

Radio Gambia was the first media broadcaster in the Gambia, opened in 1962. Its historical base is Bakau (a town in the Gambia).

In December 1995, GRTS was commissioned by the Gambian government which began test transmissions under the Gambia Telecommunications Company (Gamtel), using a 5KW transmitter in Abuko. Then, it adopted its own television channel. The Station operates as a public service station based on the tradition of Radio Gambia. Up until broadcasts started, viewers relied on Senegalese television, where 75% of its programming was in French, yet few people understood the language and the news attracted the viewers more. Thanks to a joint URTNA-CFI collaboration, the station carried UEFA Euro 1996 and the 1996 Summer Olympic Games, followed by the installation of two transmitters in August 1996 (5KW and 2KW) enabling the television signals to be received nationwide. The Station's programmes are mostly news, public service announcements, education, entertainment and religious related (Islam and Christianity only, mostly Islam and nothing on Traditional African religion).

Nowadays, GRTS operates GRTS TV & GRTS Radio.

== Awards ==
In 2010, the station was awarded the National Order of the Republic of the Gambia with the rank of commander.
