= Papa Susso =

Gambian kora musician

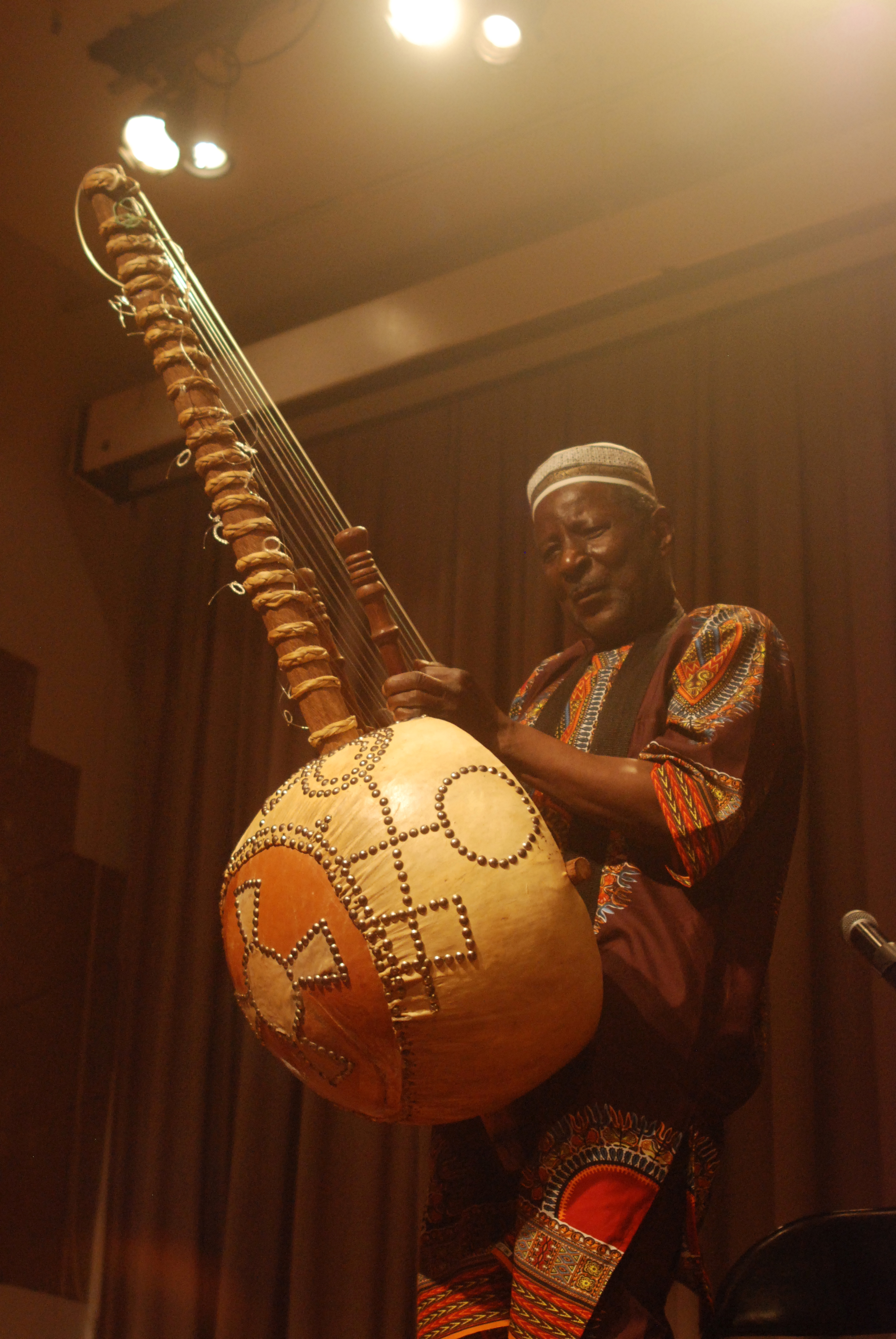
Papa Susso plays the kora at the House Divided literary event, Cooper Union, April 2017.

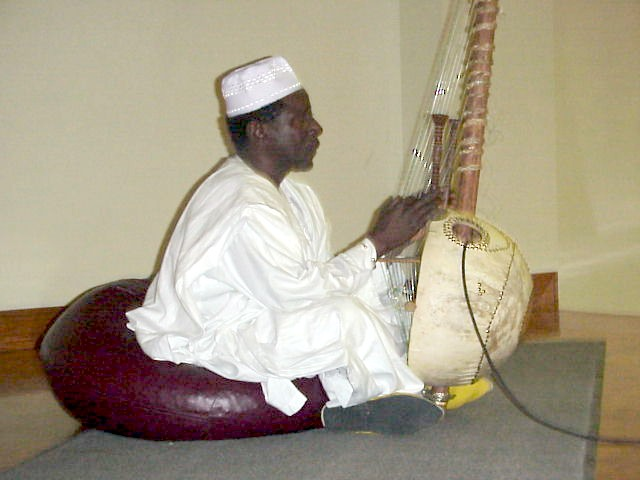
Mandinka Griot Al-Haji Papa Bunka Susso performing songs from the oral tradition of the Gambia on the kora

Alhaji Papa Susso (Suntu) is a griot or jeli, master kora player, and director of the Koriya Musa Center for Research in Oral Tradition. He was born 29 September 1947, in the village of Sotuma Sere in the Upper River Division of The Republic of Gambia, West Africa. The Susso family represents a dynasty of traditional oral historians and praise singers. His father taught him to play the kora, a 21-stringed, lute-like instrument, when he was five years old. Papa Susso's ancestors were instrumental in the creation, as well as the development of the instrument for over two centuries.

== Education and public service career ==
Susso attended Bakadaji Primary School from 1953 to 1960 and enrolled at the Armitage High School, Georgetown, The Gambia, from 1960–1965, where he graduated with honors. Thereafter, he received an appointment as Agricultural Assistant in the Ministry of Agricultural and Natural Resources. Upon receiving a scholarship to Cuttington University, Suacoco, Liberia, he quit that post. He received a bachelor of arts degree in business administration in 1969.

Returning to The Gambia, Susso embarked on a career in the civil service, receiving an appointment as Senior Accountant in the Ministry of Work and Communications. Other posts included Financial Attaché and Liaison Officer for The Gambia Embassy in Freetown, Sierra Leone; he was accredited as well to the Republic of Liberia, Guinea and The Ivory Coast.

== Performing career ==
Susso ended his civil service career in order to resume his traditional role, becoming the chief kora player of The Gambia National Cultural Troupe under the Ministry of Education and Culture. In 1974, he left that position, founding his own cultural organization: The Manding Music and Dance Limited. The new organization sought to conduct research on Manding history, traditions and ethnomusicology, while providing assistance, particularly in business management, for traditional Manding performers. More generally, MMDL sought to revive, preserve and disseminate knowledge and appreciation of traditional Manding musical arts. His signature performances include selections from the traditional epic in celebration of Sundiata Keita, founder of the Mali Empire and an original composition in honor of the Apollo 11 astronauts. Susso, now based equally in the Bronx and in the Gambia, travels widely, and has been a premier performer in the "American Classic African Portraits" by Hannibal Peterson. He performed at New York City's Carnegie Hall twice, for the Baltimore, Detroit, Kalamazoo, San Antonio, St. Louis and Chicago Symphonies, the Louisiana Philharmonic of New Orleans, and Kazumi Watanabe Opera, Tokyo, Japan. Most of his time is spent giving performances in schools, from elementary through university levels, and discussing his art with students and faculty, giving both classroom presentations and formal concert performances. Susso has also been appointed as Regents' Lecturer in ethnomusicology in 1991 at the University of California, Santa Barbara, He appears alone with his kora or with his ensemble that includes singer/dancer Tapa Demba, balafonist Bala Kouyate and his son, Alhassan Susso, on second kora.
