= Jali Nyama Suso =

Gambian musician (c. 1925 – 1991)

- Born: January 1, 1925; Bakau
- Died: January 1, 1991 (aged 66)
- Occupation: Musician

Jali Nyama Suso (circa 1925–1991) was a kora player from Gambia. He had a program on Radio Gambia for 20 years. He released his first album in 1971 while he was teaching at the University of Washington. In the 1980s he toured in England, France, Germany, and Sweden.

He also worked on the soundtrack for Roots. Long before any of that he had been known in his native country. He did not fully live the tradition of a wandering musicians because he lost his leg at age 16, but by the mid-1960s became popular on radio. He attained enough respect to do an arrangement for their national anthem. In 1991 he died of tuberculosis after several years of illness.
