= Alieu Ebrima Cham Joof =

Gambian politician (1924–2011)

Alhaji Alieu Ebrima Cham Joof
- Cham Joof as a Scout Master
- Born: Alieu Ebrima Cham Joof; 22 October 1924; Bathurst, British Gambia
- Died: 2 April 2011 (aged 86); Bakau, Gambia
- Resting place: Juswang cemetery, Gambia
- Occupations: historian, politician, author, trade unionist, broadcaster, radio programme director, scout master, Pan-Africanist, lecturer, columnist, nationalist
- Relatives: Alhaji Bai Modi Joof (younger brother), Tamsier Joof (nephew), Pap Cheyassin Secka (nephew)
- Writing career
- Pen name: Alh. A.E. Cham Joof
- Notable works: The history of the Banjul Mosque Getting to know The Gambia The root cause of the bread and butter demonstration Banjul Daemba 1816–1999 Tagator
- Movements: history, politics, culture

Alieu Ebrima Cham Joof (22 October 1924 – 2 April 2011) commonly known as Cham Joof or Alhaji Cham Joof, (pen name: Alh. A.E. Cham Joof) was a Gambian historian, politician, author, trade unionist, broadcaster, radio programme director, scout master, Pan-Africanist, lecturer, columnist, activist and an African nationalist who advocated for the Gambia's independence during the colonial era.

== Early life ==
Cham Joof was born on 22 October 1924 at 7 Griffith Street (Half-Die) in Bathurst now Banjul, the capital of the Gambia. He came from a Serer and Wolof background. He was the third child and the eldest son of Ebrima Joof (1887–1949) and Aji Anna Samba (1896 – 9 April 1977). On his father's side (the Joof family), he was a descendant of the Joof Dynasty of Sine and Saloum, and the Njie Dynasty of Jolof. On his mother's side, he was the great grand-nephew of Tafsir Sa Lolly Jabou Samba — a 19th-century Senegambian jihadist, military strategists and advisor to Maba Diakhou Bâ and one of the commanders of his army. Cham Joof was the elder brother of Gambian barrister Alhaji Bai Modi Joof.

=== Education ===
Cham Joof started his schooling just before his 12th birthday. He attended the St. Mary's Personage at the Priest's Residence in 1935. Having completed his first key stage, he proceeded to St. Mary's Kings School (St Mary's Anglican School) under the guidance of Reverend John Colley Faye (commonly known as Rev. J. C. Faye). He was there until 1940. Having passed his Standard Four Examination, he progressed to St. Augustine's High School (now St Augustine's Secondary School) with prominent Gambian political personalities like Alhaji Kebba Conteh, M. L Drammeh and Michael Baldeh. Cham Joof was a passionate football player. While at St. Augustine's High School, he was selected as the School's goalkeeper. His favourite subjects included history and religious studies. He completed his schooling in 1945 which coincided with the end of World War II. After his schooling, he got a job with CFAO (Compagnie Française de l'Afrique Occidentale) where he had worked as a Commercial Clerk until 1962.

== Scouting movement ==
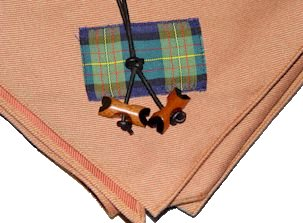
The Scout Woodbadge.

Cham Joof is termed the "doyen of scouting in the Gambia". He grew up from the Wolf Cub Scout and served the movement from 1938 to 2005 when he retired as the President of the Gambia National Scout Council. Cham Joof wrote extensively about the history of Scouting in the Gambia. In 1943 he was appointed leader of the Gambian Contingent of Boys Scout travelling to Mali. From 1946 to 1952, Cham Joof was appointed Assistant Scout Master. He was the founder and first Group Scout Master of 5th Bathurst (now Banjul). In the late 1940s, Cham Joof represented the Gambia's Scout movement and delivered a speech in front of King George VI in London. Cham Joof was the first Gambian Scout to be awarded the Wood Badge by the Chief Scout, which was held in 1954 at the International Scout Leader training centre at Gilwell Park in England. It was during his scouting days that he was appointed by the Gambia Scouts Council to represent the youth at the Coronation ceremony of Queen Elizabeth II in June 1953. In 1957, Cham Joof was selected as the Leader of the Gambia Contingent at the World Scout Jamboree which was held at Sutton Coldfield in Birmingham (England). From growing up as a Wolf Cub Scout to becoming a Scout Master, Commissioner in Charge of Training and President of the Gambia Scout Council, Cham Joof gave a rare interview with Foroyaa Panorama in which he stated:

"Scouting, which is a supplementary to education, was dear in my heart and I served the movement from 1938 up to date."

== Party politics and activism (colonial period) ==
Under the guidance of Rev. J. C Faye and I.M. Garba-Jahumpa, Cham Joof entered politics and in 1954 defeated his opponent Paul Njie and was elected as a Town Councillor for the Soldier Town Ward in Banjul Central. At the end of his first term in office, Cham Joof stood again in 1958 unopposed. While at the Council, Cham Joof held several positions including: Chairman of the Colony Team (equivalent of the Physical Planning Unit of the Ministry for Local Government); Chairman of the Parks, Open Space and Cemetery Committee. By 1961 he was appointed as a Member of the Royal Visit Committee of Queen Elizabeth II’s visit to the Gambia. By 1962, his second term as Councillor came to an end. Though a prominent Councillor, Cham Joof's major break in politics came in 1960 when he was elected Social Secretary of The Gambia Democratic Party (The GDP). The GDP (previously the Gambia Congress Party) was the first political party in the Gambia formed by Rev. J. C Faye in February 1951 at the then Information Bureau at Allen Street in Banjul. Cham Joof's appointment as Social Secretary, a party he had been a member of since its conception propelled his political career, making him a prominent public figure in the Gambia.

=== Nationalism ===
While in politics, Cham Joof held a series of campaigns against the British colonial administration in the Gambia. Such campaigns were to acquire independence for the Gambia from colonial rule. This became a mission after Ghana was granted independence in 1957. In 1958, Cham Joof and his political associates formed an All Party Committee which included political leaders and chiefs. The purpose of which was for self-governance and to determine the political direction of the country. It took 18 months for the Committee to draw up a comprehensive Constitution with the slogan "Self-government now." When they finally submitted their Constitution to the Secretary of State for the Colonies (Allan Lennox Boyd) through the British Governor, almost 75% of their proposals were rejected. The rejection of their Constitution spearheaded the "Bread and Butter Demonstration" of 1959.

==== The Bread and Butter Demonstration (1959) ====
The Bread and Butter Demonstration of 1959. Cham Joof in the white hat and shirt holding a file on his hand.

Following the British administration's refusal to grant the Gambia independence, Cham Joof organised a pre-demonstration meeting outside his family residence in Albion Place (now Freedom Lane in Banjul). He and his colleagues had previously learned that the Secretary of State for the colonies (Allan Lennox Boyd) was on a day visit to the Gambia (2 June 1959) but had refused to see them to address their demands, citing "tight schedule." As such, they organised the meeting to coincide with this visit. In addressing the people and his colleagues, Cham Joof informed them that the colonial authorities have rejected their proposal and the Secretary of State is refusing to see them, and those who want can join them in the march to Government House to demand self-governance. When the demonstrators entered the vicinity of Government House, they started chanting: "We want rights and justice." A member of the public started to chant "we want bread and butter", which was then copied by everyone and this is how the "Bread and Butter" came about. This incident is commonly known as "the Bread and Butter Demonstration" in the Gambia.

Cham Joof and his associates were refused an audience with the Secretary of State for the Colony, and a British field force was ordered to beat the unarmed demonstrators and used tear gas against them to stop them from entering Government House in Banjul. The demonstrators were defiant and demanded to see the Secretary of State. In the midst of this, the Police Superintendent Mr Ferguson instructed his Secretary Miss Clark to type a Rights Act with the content: "Anybody seen at the vicinity of the Governor's house will be tried and imprisoned for 5 years." Cham Joof and some of his colleagues were indicted as "inciting the public to disobey the laws of the land." He and his colleagues like Crispin Grey Johnson (not to be confused with Crispin Grey-Johnson – Secretary of State for Higher Education as of 2008) and Mr M. B. Jones (both members of the Aku ethnic group) were arrested and taken to court and termed political prisoners.

In spite of their protestation to the presiding magistrate, the case went on for three months. Their Gambian lawyer Bamba Saho challenged the colonial authorities and cited the Declaration of Human Rights and "Freedom of assembly" which led to their release by the Attorney general.

=== Independence ===
Under the auspices of the Democratic Congress Alliance (DCA), Cham Joof stood against Pierre Sarr Njie (commonly known as P. S. Njie) at the Legislative Council Election of 1960, but was defeated. In 1961, the British Government decided to appoint P. S. Njie, (who was in the minority) as Chief Minister of the Gambia. This decision was contrary to the wishes of many of the Gambian voters because P.S Njie was in the minority and had lower numerical strength in the Council than Sir Dawda Kairaba Jawara (who would later become the first president of the Gambia). As such, the Council was dissolved and a Constitutional Conference was held at Lancaster House in London, in July 1961.

Cham Joof and his party members joined the dominant People's Progressive Party (PPP) in 1962 to form the PPP/DCA Alliance. In this new political alliance, Cham Joof stood once again against P. S. Njie but was defeated. According to Cham Joof, he "knew that he could not defeat P. S. Njie" but upheld his "moral dignity as a defector for P. S. Njie not to penetrate into the provinces". The date for Self-Governance was fixed for 1962 and Dawda Jawara was appointed Prime Minister of the Colony. In 1964, another Constitutional Conference to determine the date for independence was held at Marlborough House in London where all political parties were represented. The date was finally fixed for February 1965. On 18 February 1965, the Gambia became an independent State and Sir Dawda Kairaba Jawara who was knighted by the Queen of the United Kingdom became the country's first president. Although Cham Joof was a member of Dawda Jawara's party (the PPP), he was not one of the main political figures of this party, neither before nor after independence.

=== Trade Unionism ===
Cham Joof's involvement in the trade union movement was inspired by Edward Francis Small – a member of the Aku group who formed the first trade union in the Gambia in 1929 – The Bathurst Trade Union and in 1935 the Gambia Labour Union. During the colonial era, there was no Wage Control Board. Gambian workers were required to either accept the low wages paid to them or leave their employment. To oppose this, Edward Francis organized a national strike which lasted for 82 days. The strike however did not achieve its overall objective as low wages and forced taxation continued right up to 1961. In the 1961 groundnut trade season, Cham Joof (a member of the Select Committee) and his associates at the Gambia Workers' Union organized a national strike on behalf of the daily paid workers. The strike went on for five days. Momodou Ebrima Jallow (commonly known as M. E. Jallow), who was then leader of the Gambia Workers' Union, was left with the task to negotiate wage terms with the Chambers of Commerce. The Chambers of Commerce told Jallow to persuade the workers to return to work and their wages will be paid. The workers gathered at the KGV (King George V) playing ground at "Half-Die" in Banjul to await Jallow's report. Jallow reported to the workers the successful negotiation and asked them to return to work. Cham Joof was suspicious of the British administration and strongly believed that Jallow was being fooled. To express his disapproval, Cham Joof went on the stage and told all the workers not to return to work until their wage demands were met. In Wolof, Jallow told Cham Joof: "You are setting the nation on fire," to which Cham Joof replied: "I will burn it until it turns to ashes... positive action is the order of the day, nobody is going to work for them."

Cham Joof spearheaded a demonstration in Banjul and after their meeting, Jallow was arrested. Cham Joof moved the crowd of demonstrators near his house and set up a Strike Committee which drafted letters of protest and petitions and sent out to international organizations including the United Nations. When he heard of Jallow's arrest, Cham Joof led his followers to the Police Station at Buckle Street and demanded for his immediate release. He galvanized the support of commercial workers, civil servants and the World Assembly of Youth. Jallow was released from prison. The British administration seeing that Gambian workers were in support of the demonstration, requested assistance from the British administration in Sierra Leone to send some officers to the Gambia to assist the Gambia's police force. Instead of a huge force, two Commissioners were sent to the Gambia to draft a report to amend The Trade Union Act and to institute a Joint Industrial Council. Cham Joof was appointed Chairman of the Joint Industrial Council in the early 1960s.

== Pan-Africanism ==
From the 1960s, Cham Joof stood out as one of the leading Pan-Africanist in the Gambia. He attended the first Pan-African Youth Movement Conference that was held in Tunisia in 1960 and the second conference in 1961 at Tanzania. In these conferences, he got to meet Julius Nyerere and Kenneth Kaunda (who later became first presidents of Tanzania and Zambia respectively) and held political discussions with Kenneth Kaunda (whom he shared a plane with) about gaining independence for Africa.

In the first ever Organization of African Unity Conference held on 1 May 1963 at Addis Ababa, Cham Joof delivered a speech to the Members in which he said:

"It is barely 75 years when the European Powers sat round the table in Germany each holding a dagger to carve up Africa for its own benefit.… Your success will inspire and speed up the freedom and total independence of the African continent and eradicate imperialism and colonialism from the continent and eventually neo-colonialism from the globe… Your failure, which no true African in Africa is praying for, will prolong our struggle with bitterness and disappointment. I therefore adjure that you ignore any suggestion outside Africa and holding that the present civilization, which some of the big powered are boasting of, sprang up from Africa, and realising that the entire world has something earthly to learn from Africa, you would endeavour your utmost to come to agreement, save Africa from the clutches of neo-colonialism and resurrect African dignity, manhood and national stability."

== Alex Haley and Roots ==
In 1967, while he was the Secretary-General of the Gambia Farmers Poultry and Fishermen Union, Cham Joof went to the Atlantic Hotel in Banjul to meet his fellow trade union colleague Irving Brown from the American Federation of Labor. A former scout of Cham Joof who was with Alex Haley and his party including George Sim saw Cham Joof and introduced him to Alex Haley who went to the Gambia in search of his roots based on an old story told to him by his family. They requested the assistance of Cham Joof to carry out the research. Cham Joof asked for a grace period to prepare himself for this challenging appointment. He enlisted three of his friends: M. E. Jallow, A. B. Sallah and K. O. Janneh. The four of them set up a research committee and then went on the trail in search of Alex Haley's ancestor, and communicated with Alex constantly after he returned to the United States. Cham Joof and his team expressed some doubt about Kebba Kanji Fofana (the griot at Jufureh) and decided to interview certain Gambians including reputable oral historians who may be knowledgeable on the subject. When Alex visited the Gambia, he set several conditions, some of which included the changing of the title from the originally decided title and the dramatization of the work. Roots: The Saga of an American Family would be fictional. Alex Haley's roots and TV shows based on his own family history have been a topic of controversy for several years and challenged by some genealogists such as Elizabeth Shown Mills.

"The secret to success is the willingness to serve without aspiring for rewards."

— Alhaji A. E. Cham Joof

== Politics (post-colonial period) ==
=== Jammeh's government ===
After president Yahya Jammeh (president of the Gambia) seized power in 1994 in a military coup d'état, some Gambian statesmen and personalities such as Dr Lenrie Peters; Deyda Hydara; Bishop Solomon Tilewa Johnson; etc. were appointed and made members of the National Consultative Committee, whose brief was to ensure a quick and smooth transition back to democratic rule. Cham Joof was elected as one these statesmen. Although he devoted a lot of his time on his books and manuscripts, Cham Joof served as a valuable source of information for the younger generation of Gambian politicians. Some Gambian journalists have criticized president Yahya Jammeh for failing to adhere to the report and recommendations of this Committee, and it is reported that president Jammeh set up this Committee merely to bring respectability, legitimacy and confidence to his regime.

In 2002, Cham helped in the creation of the Hansard Unit at the National Assembly. In that same year, he was appointed as a member of the International Committee of Dispute Resolution.

== History and academia ==
=== Radio Gambia ===
Cham Joof joined the Radio Gambia as a freelance broadcaster in 1968. During his time at Radio Gambia, he was appointed Director of Programme, and spearheaded a radio programme called Chossani Senegambia (the history of Senegambia) with veteran presenters like Alhaji Assan Njie, Alhaji Mansour Njie, etc. The pre-recorded programme was a collaboration effort between Radio Gambia and Radio Senegal. Both radio stations planned for the programme to go live at the same time and date so that Gambian and Senegalese listeners can listen to it at the same time. Cham Joof and his team of journalists travelled throughout the Gambia and Senegal interviewing the elders to narrate the history of Senegambia. In many cases, Senegalese historians made live appearances to Radio Gambia studio and vice versa. Cham Joof was an advocate for the revival of Senegambian culture and local languages, and by 1974 was appointed head of local languages. He retired from broadcasting in 1982.

=== Street names in Banjul ===
Before the street names in Banjul were changed on 22 August 1998 in an attempt to distant the City from its colonial past Cham Joof was consulted to give the history of the streets in Banjul, the prominent families that dwelled in the relevant streets, their historical accounts and their importance on Senegambian history.

=== University lectures ===
In his later years, Cham Joof became a part-time history lecturer at the University of the Gambia. Later on the university students went to his home to receive their lectures. He has also authored several books and manuscripts relating to the history of Gambia and Senegambia.

==== Selection of books and manuscripts authored by Cham Joof ====
Many of Cham Joof's manuscripts were unpublished but quoted by scholars who interacted with him, including African, European and American scholars on Senegambian history. Some of Cham Joof's works include:

- Gambia, Land of our heritage
- The history of the Banjul Mosque
- Senegambia, The land of our heritage
- The history of the Bushell. Origin of The Gambia Chamber of Commerce & Industries
- Getting to know The Gambia
- Reviving a culture that had refused to die (1995)
- The calendar of historical events in The Gambia, 1455–1995 (1995)
- The Research Committee of Mbootaayi Xamxami Wolof
- The Centenary of Muhammedan School, 1903–2003. The First School Built by Muslim Community in Bathurst. A Memory Lane.
- The lives of the Great Islamic Scholars and Religious leaders of Senegambia. (November 1998)
- Banjul, The Gambia
- From: Freedom. To: Slavery. The evil that men do. Lives after them. Alex Haley’s "Roots"
- The century of historic events in The Gambia. Third Edition, 1900–1999.
- Ethnic groups of The Gambia. 1990
- The history of Fanal (January 1991)
- Party politics in The Gambia, 1945–1970
- The visit of the venerable Sheikh Alhaji Sekou Umar (Futi) Taal, Njol Futa to The Gambia. A visit which illuminates a whole nation.
- Know your country, General knowledge, Questions
- Know your country, General knowledge, Answers
- The Adventurer
- The traditional way of life in Gambian society
- The root cause of the bread and butter demonstration, s.n. (1959)
- Banjul Daemba 1816–1999 Tagator (1999)

=== Newspaper columns ===
Cham Joof was a regular columnist and contributor to The Point Newspaper as well as the Weekend Observer’s "History Corner" (The Daily Observer′s weekend paper). He "pioneered" this column (History Corner) in 1993 and later asked Hassoum Ceesay of the Daily Observer to take over it. Ceesay took over the column in 1996. Some of Cham Joof's columns include:

- The Point Newspaper, Friday, 9 May 2003 (Gambia):

Alhaji. A. E. Cham Joof, M.R.G "The Genesis of The Half-Die Mosque."

- Weekend Observer, 19–21 July 1996, p. 11:

Alhajie. A. E. Cham Joof, "Chossani Senegambia", (History of Saloum)

- Weekend Observer. 29–31 March 1995. P. 9 (Gambia ):

History Corner with Alhaji A. E Cham Joof. "Diamond Jubilee of Scouting in The Gambia, Senegambian Scouting Joint Committee Senegalo/Gambian Katibougou old Scouts."

- Weekend Observer. May 1995

History Corner with Alhaji A. E Cham Joof. "The History of the Banjul Mosque", Weekend Observer, 5–7 May 1995: 5, 10.

== Organisations founded or co-founded by Cham Joof ==
- In 1957, Cham Joof founded the first Gambian Youth Movement called the Central Council of Youths in the Gambia. He was the Secretary General of this Council and assisted in building the Council's headquarters in Banjul.
- Cham Joof was founder-member and Secretary of the Gambia Development Company. This company was founded in 1964 and is reported to have introduced tourism in the Gambia.
- In 1965, Cham Joof founded the Bathurst Studios. The purpose of this studio was to train young men on practical skills such as art and craft. This studio designed and produced the Banjul City Council coat of arms.
- The Gambia Farmers Poultry and Fishermen Union was founded by Cham Joof in 1966. He was also a member and Secretary General of this Union. It was during his term in office as Secretary General that he received Alex Haley when he visited the Gambia in 1967.
- Mbootaayi Xamxami Wolof (The Wolof Wisdom's Association) was founded in 1978. Cham Joof was a founder-member and Secretary of this Association.
- Cham Joof co-founded "ECCO" the Gambia (Education Through Culture and Communication Organisation). He was the serving Chairman of this Organisation. ECCO is a "Non-governmental organisation interested in the promotion and preservation of local cultures."

== Other positions held by Cham Joof ==
- Member of the Dispute Tribunal Unit of the Magistrates Court in Banjul (2003–2007)
- Chairman of the Finance Committee of the Business Training Centre (BTC)
- Chairman of the Gambian Planning Committee
- Vice President of the Gambia Football Association
- Secretary of the Central Council of Youth Clubs of the Gambia
- Financial Secretary of the Gambia Democratic Party... etc.

== Death ==
Cham Joof died on 2 April 2011, just before his 87th birthday, at his home in Bakau (a town in the Gambia). In tribute to Cham Joof, Hassoum Ceesay of the Daily Observer newspaper said:

"The demise... of Alhaji A.E. Cham Joof has cost The Gambia its foremost historian."

Professor Sulayman S. Nyang of Howard University said:

"Known to me since my youthful days as a Boy's Scout in the Gambia, I now write to testify that he was a community leader and activists who tried very hard to capture our memories and stories in the pages of history."

Mr Momodou Jammeh of The Point Newspaper paid tribute in the following terms:

"He was prominent among the organizers of the Bread and Butter demonstration, which spearheaded constitutional development in the Gambia.... He was a dynamic and soft spoken person, who kept a very low profile. His door was always open to anyone in need of his service."

== Legacy ==
"When independence came to the Gambia Cham Joof was not one of the dominant figures in the cabinet of Sir Jawara or in the Gambian Parliament. However, in the wide perspective of Gambian history one can now write retrospectively, that in the past sixteenth years of President Yahya Jammeh, Cham Joof, whether acknowledged or not served as a useful source of information for the younger generation of Gambian politicos running the country. These aspects of his legacies will be made known by researchers who write M.A. theses and doctoral dissertations on political and social figures in Gambia in the twentieth and Twenty-first centuries."

— Professor Sulayman S. Nyang (Howard University).

Cham Joof left a legacy of several books and manuscripts about the history of the Gambia and Senegambia in general (Senegal and Gambia), as well as a cultural development within the Gambia. During his lifetime he donated several documents to the Gambia's National Archive (the National Record Services) – where he served as chairman. He was also a philosophical person and had left several proverbs rooted in "social consciousness" and history. Cham Joof is seen as one of the leading Gambian nationalists of the colonial era who worked diligently to achieve independence for the Gambia. He was one of the leading Gambian political figures who fought for the introduction of the franchise to all Gambians, and forced the British Government to concede to the idea with the amendment of the Constitution. Although Cham Joof was not one of the main personalities of the People's Progressive Party before or after independence, his long political, historical and cultural contribution to the country is well acknowledged.

== See also ==
- List of Gambian writers
