= Music of the Gambia =

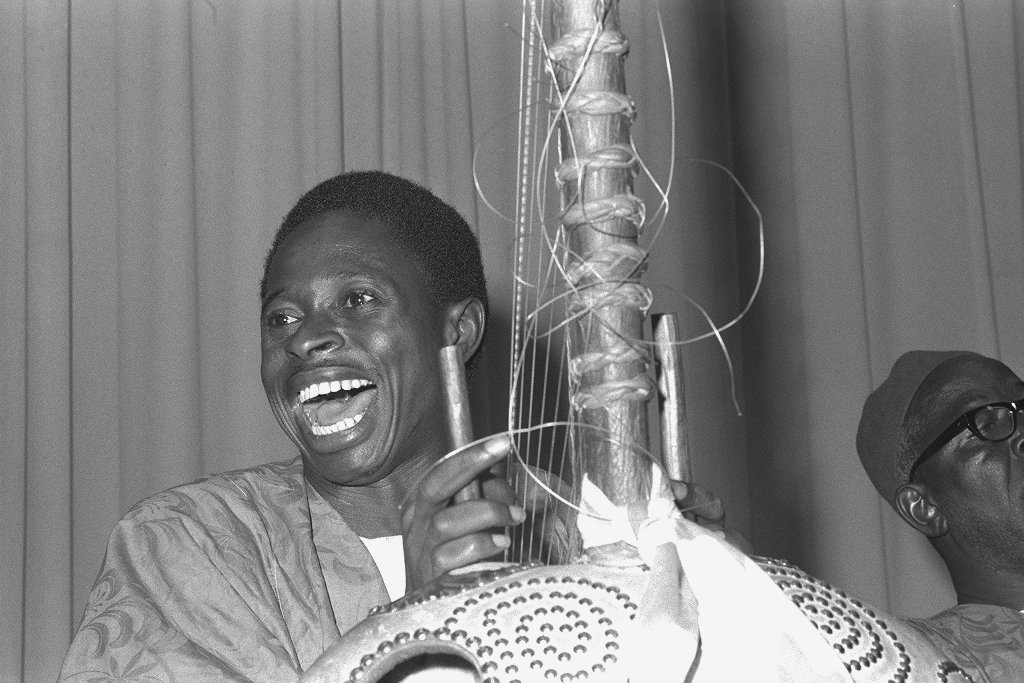
Musicians from Gambia, West Africa gave a free public concert in the Carmichael Auditorium, National Museum of History and Technology, now the National Museum of American History, in June 1977. The musicians performed on the koru, hallam, and balafon

The music of the Gambia is closely linked musically with that of its neighbor, Senegal, which surrounds its inland frontiers completely. Among its prominent musicians is Foday Musa Suso. Mbalax is a widely known popular dance music of the Gambia and neighbouring Senegal. It fuses popular Western music and dance, with sabar, the traditional drumming and dance music of the Wolof and Serer people.

== National music ==
"For The Gambia Our Homeland", the national anthem of the Gambia, was composed by Jeremy Frederic Howe, based on the traditional Mandinka song "Foday Kaba Dumbuya", with words by Virginia Julia Howe, for an international competition to produce an anthem (and flag) before independence from the United Kingdom in 1965.

== Traditional music ==
The Gambia, the smallest country in mainland Africa, is an independent coastal state along the River Gambia. It gained its separate identity as a colony of the United Kingdom while Senegal was a colony of France, but the two countries' traditional music are very much intertwined. Among Gambia's people, who together number some 1.728 million (2010), 42% are Mandinka, 18% Fula, 16% Wolof\Serer, 10% Jola and 9% Soninke, the remainder being 4% other African and 1% non-African (2003). 63% of Gambians live in rural villages (1993 census), though the population is young and tends towards urbanization. 90% are Muslims and most of the remainder Christians.

Griots, also known as jelis, hereditary praise-singers, a legacy of the Mande Empire, are common throughout the region. Gambian griots, as elsewhere, often play the kora, a 21 string harp. The region of Brikama has produced some famous musicians, including Foday Musa Suso, who founded the Mandingo Griot Society in New York City in the 1970s, bringing Mande music to the New York avant-garde scene and collaborating with Bill Laswell, Philip Glass and the Kronos Quartet.

Mbalax (meaning "rhythm" in Wolof), derives its from accompanying rhythms used in sabar, a tradition that originated from the Serer of the Kingdom of Sine and spread to the Kingdom of Saloum whence Wolof migrants took it to the Wolof kingdoms. The Nder (lead drum), Sabar (rhythm drum), and Tama (talking drum) percussion section traces some of its technique to the ritual music of Njuup.

The Njuup was also progenitor of Tassu, used when chanting ancient religious verses. The griots of Senegambia still use it at marriages, naming ceremonies or when singing the praises of patrons. Most Senegalese and Gambian artists use it in their songs. The Serer people are known especially for vocal and rhythmic practices that infuse their everyday language with complex overlapping cadences and their ritual with intense collaborative layerings of voice and rhythm." Each motif has a purpose and is used for different occasions. Individual motifs represent the history and genealogy of a particular family and are used during weddings, naming ceremonies, funerals etc.

== Popular music ==
Gambian popular music began in the 1960s. The Super Eagles and Guelewar formed under the influence of American, British and Cuban music. The Super Eagles played merengue and other pop genres with Wolof lyrics and minor African elements. They visited London in 1977, appearing on Mike Raven's Band Call. After the programme, when the band began playing traditional tunes, an unknown listener is said to have inspired the group to return to the Gambia's musical roots, and they spent two years travelling around studying traditional music. The reformed band was called Ifang Bondi, and their style was Afro-Manding blues.

Gambian Laba Sosseh, who relocated to Dakar, Senegal as a teenager, spent his entire career outside of the Gambia, becoming a significant presence in the African and New York salsa scene. Musa Ngum, former Guelewar and Super Diamono frontman relocated to Senegal in 1981. Civil unrest caused Ifang Bondi and other Gambian musicians to leave for Europe.

Former Ifang Bondi musician Juldeh Camara has been working with Justin Adams since 2007 and has been touring all over the world. Also from Ifang Bondi, Musa Mboob and Ousman Beyai have started a new group XamXam which started with a project in the Gambia to produce new music by taking six musicians based in the UK to the Gambia to work with top musicians from four different tribal backgrounds. Ousman Beyai moved to the UK where he worked with Musa Mboob to set up the live band XamXam.

Jaliba Kuyateh and his Kumareh band is currently the most popular exponent of Gambia's Mandinka music. There is also a thriving Gambian hip hop scene.

The Hip-hop in Gambia started in the late 1990s. The first rap group of Gambia was black nature founded in 1995. Others crew are also in the hip-hop movement like Da fugitivz. They are mixing their music with their Traditional instruments like junjung, Balafon, Djembe etc... According to the development of the country some rapper are using the music for changes of the country.

It is impossible to overstate the importance of Alhaji Bai Konte as the first to introduce the kora and its musical culture to the live and mass media music audience. Every kora musician after his North American debut tour in 1973 owes him an unqualified debt of gratitude for his accomplishments. In 1973, Alhaji Bai Konte of Brikama, Gambia, introduced the kora to mass audiences in North America. He performed at some of the largest festivals in North America, appeared multiple times on National Public Radio and Television, was interviewed and reviewed by many newspapers. The tour would not have happened without the dedication and hard work of Marc and Susan Pevar, who organized, promoted and facilitated Alhaji Bai Konte's tours in North American from 1973 through 1980. That story is told elsewhere, including: HOME.

== Sources ==
- Hudson, Mark, Jenny Cathcart and Lucy Duran. "Senegambian Stars Are Here to Stay". 2000. In Broughton, Simon and Ellingham, Mark with McConnachie, James and Duane, Orla (Ed.), World Music, Vol. 1: Africa, Europe and the Middle East, pp 617–633. Rough Guides Ltd, Penguin Books. ISBN 1-85828-636-0

== Discography ==
A Gambian music discography is located at Radio Africa - Gambian vinyl discography
