= Radio Gambia =

- Gambia

Programming
- Languages: English, Senegambian languages
- Format: Contemporary hit radio, News, Speech

Ownership
- Owner: Gambian government
- Sister stations: GRTS (Television)

History
- First air date: 1962

Links
- Website: www.grts.gm

Radio Gambia is the national radio broadcaster of the West African state of the Gambia. Established in 1962, it became the first radio station in the Gambia.

== History ==
Radio Gambia was the first media broadcaster of the Gambia following its establishment in 1962. Since its establishment, its historical base has always been Bakau.

"The programme Chossanie Senegambia... has a higher audience in the Gambia and Senegal than any other programme broadcast by ORTS and Radio Gambia. It is the only programme that goes into the people's own culture and tell them about the history of their ancestors."

— Alhaji Alieu Ebrima Cham Joof

Established during the colonial era with the assistance of advisors from Britain, almost all its programmes in its early years were rebroadcast of programmes in other parts of Africa and England. That strategy continued right after independence in 1965. Although it created its own news, educational shows and music programmes, Radio Gambia initially depended heavily on the BBC for programming.

On 4 October 1973 the Office de Radiodiffusion Télévision du Sénégal (ORTS) (the Senegalese radio station) who was in talks with Radio Gambia about producing a joint radio programme based on Senegambian history and broadcast in the local languages came to an agreement, and the first ever recording of the programme Chossani Senegambia (the history of Senegambia) was made. Chossani Senegambia was the first of its kind in Senegambian broadcasting history and was a success. In the Gambia, the programme was spearheaded by Alhaji Alieu Ebrima Cham Joof (the veteran historian, former Director of Programmes and Head of Local Languages at Radio Gambia), Alhaji Assan Njie (Presenter of Radio Gambia), Alhaji Mansour Njie (historian and Presenter of Radio Gambia) and Alhaji Ousman Secka.

Following a decree by the Gambian government in December 1995, Radio Gambia merged with the first national television station of the country and became The Gambia Radio & Television Service (GRTS).

== Bibliography ==
- Joof, Alhaji Alieu Ebrima Cham, "The calendar of historical events in the Gambia, 1455 - 1995", (2003)
- Joof, Alhaji Alieu Ebrima Cham, "Senegambia - The land of our heritage", (1995)
- Ebron, Paulla A., "Performing Africa", Princeton University Press (2002), ISBN 0691074895
