= Kora (instrument) =

Stringed instrument from West Africa

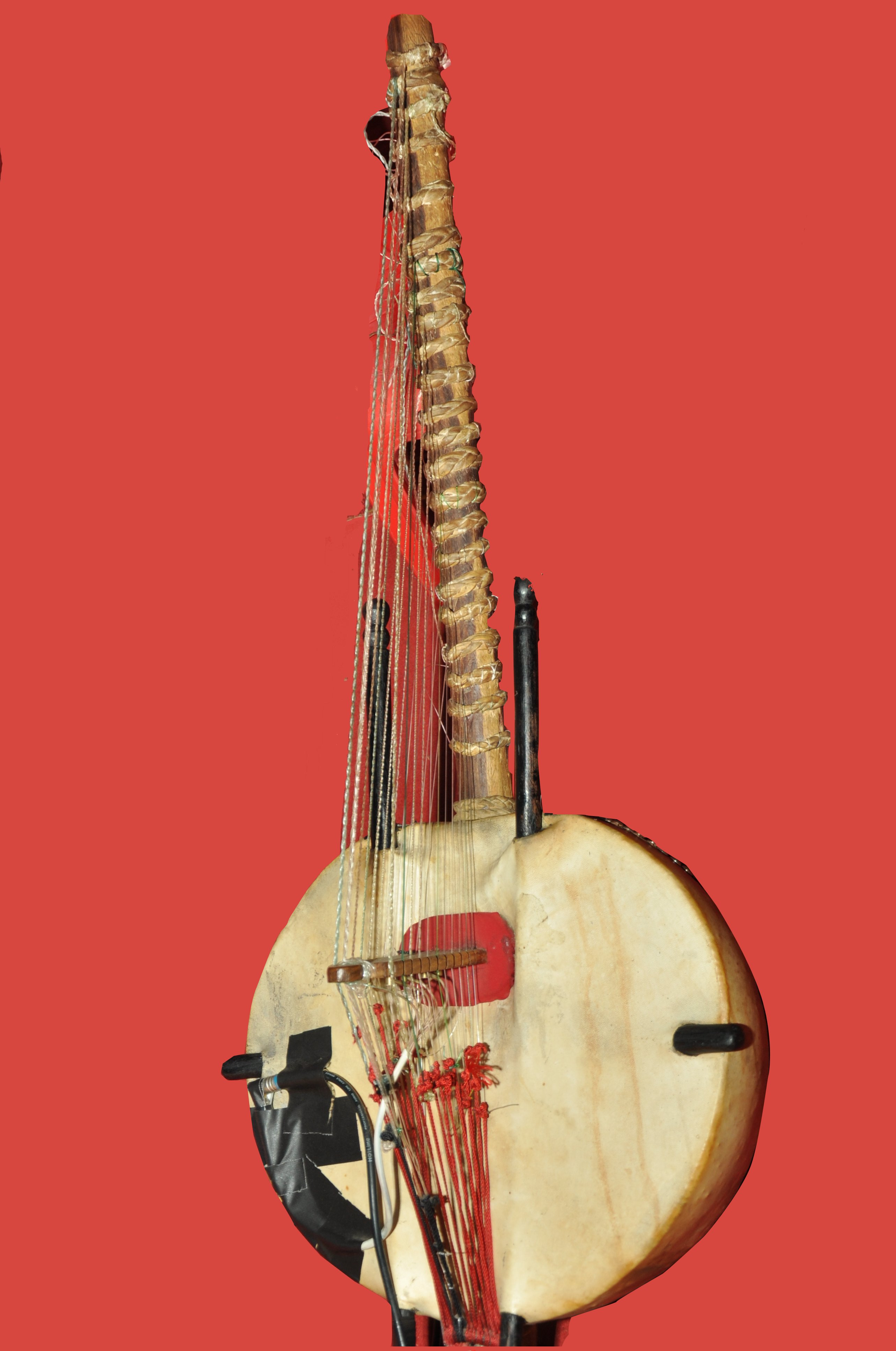
- A traditional Kora, a West African stringed instrument, featuring a large, rounded body made from a calabash gourd covered with cowhide, a long hardwood neck, and 21 strings stretched along a tall bridge. The Kora resembles a cross between a harp and a lute, often decorated with intricate carvings or beadwork

String instrument
- Classification: Malian stringed instrument with 21 strings
- Hornbostel–Sachs classification: 323-5 (Acoustic instruments which have a resonator as an integral part of the instrument, in which the plane of the strings lies at right angles to the sound-table; a line joining the lower ends of the strings would be perpendicular to the neck. These have notched bridges. Sounded by the bare fingers)
- Developed: 14th Century

Playing range
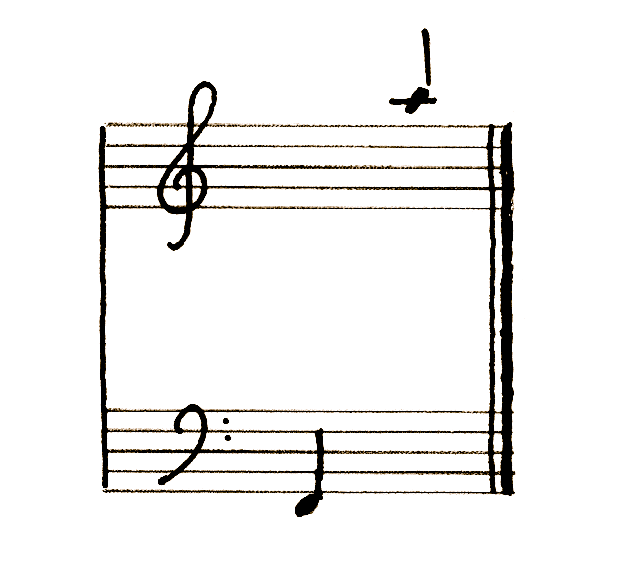
- Traditional range of the kora

Related instruments
- harp, gravi-kora, seperewa, simbing, ngoni, bolon

Musicians
- Toumani Diabaté, Jaliba Kuyateh, Ballaké Sissoko, Sona Jobarteh, Foday Musa Suso, Seckou Keita, Toubab Krewe, Jacques Burtin, Alhaji Bai Konte and sons Dembo and Sherrifo, Mory Kante, Sidiki Jobarteh, Alahji Malamini Jobarteh father of Tatadinding, Pabobo Dembo, Landing Jobarteh, Lalo keba Drameh Jobarteh, Moussa Kouyate, Jali Morikeba Kouyate.

The kora (Manding languages: ߞߐߙߊ kɔra) is a stringed instrument used extensively in West Africa. A kora typically has 21 strings, which are played by plucking with the fingers. It has features of the lute and harp.

== Description ==
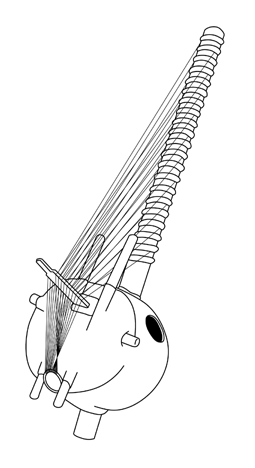
Illustration of a kora

The kora is built from a gourd, cut in half and covered with cow skin to make a resonator, with a long hardwood neck. The skin is supported by two handles that run underneath it. It has 21 strings, each of which plays a different note. These strings are supported by a notched, double, free-standing bridge. The kora does not fit into any one category of musical instrument, but rather several, and must be classified as a "double-bridged harp-lute". The strings run in two divided ranks, characteristic of a double harp. They do not end in a soundboard but are instead held in notches on a bridge, classifying it as a bridge harp. The strings originate from a string arm or neck and cross a bridge directly supported by a resonating chamber, also making it a lute.

The sound of a kora resembles that of a harp, though when played in the traditional style it bears a resemblance to a guitar played using the flamenco or Delta blues technique of plucking polyrhythmic patterns with both hands (using the remaining fingers to secure the instrument by holding the hand posts on either side of the strings). Ostinato riffs ("kumbengo") and improvised solo runs ("birimintingo") are played at the same time by skilled players.

Kora players have traditionally come from jali families (also from the Mandinka tribes) who are traditional historians, genealogists and storytellers who pass their skills on to their descendants. Though played in Guinea, Guinea-Bissau, Mali and Senegal, the instrument was first discovered in the Gambia. While those from neighbouring Guinea were known to carry the lute, Senegalese Griots were known as carriers of a hand drum known as the 'sabar'. Most West African musicians prefer the term "jali" to "griot", which is the French word. "Jali" means something similar to a "bard" or oral historian.

Traditional koras feature strings, eleven played by the left hand and ten by the right. Modern koras made in the Casamance region of southern Senegal sometimes feature additional bass strings, adding up to four strings to the traditional 21. Strings were traditionally made from thin strips of hide, such as cow or antelope skin. Today, most strings are made from harp strings or nylon fishing line, sometimes plaited together to create thicker strings.

A vital accessory in the past was the nyenmyemo, a leaf-shaped plate of tin or brass with wire loops threaded around the edge. Clamped to the bridge, or the top end of the neck it produced sympathetic sounds, serving as an amplifier since the sound carried well into the open air. In today's environment, players usually prefer or need an electronic pickup.

By moving the konso (a system of leather tuning rings) up and down the neck, a kora player can retune the instrument into one of four seven-note scales. These scales are close in tuning to western major, minor and Lydian modes.

== History ==
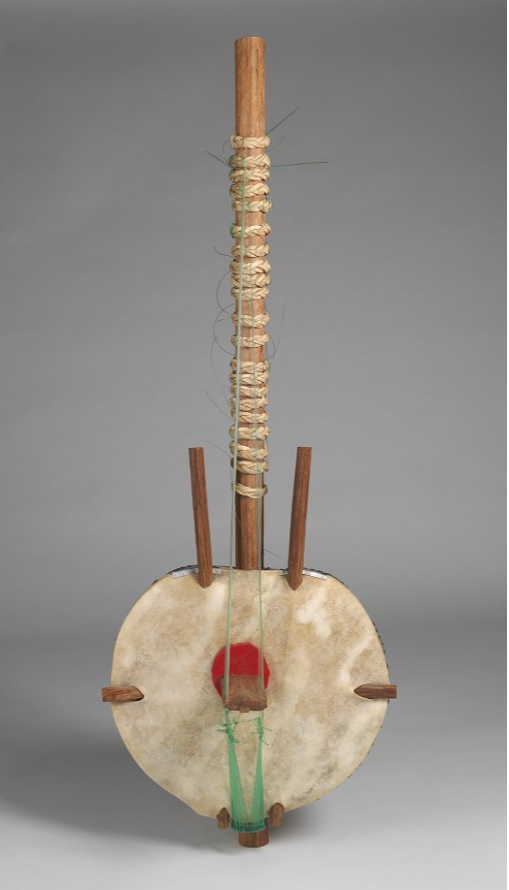
Kora (bridge-harp or plucked harp-lute) from St. Cecilia's Hall Museum, Edinburgh

=== Possible antecedents ===
In the 1300s, the traveller Ibn Battuta mentioned that the women who accompanied Dugha to perform were carrying bows that they plucked. He did not mention the number of strings, but this clearly shows the existence of harp instruments in 14th century Mali and could be the earliest written reference to the kora. The kora is designed like a bow with a gourd, similarly to Ibn Battuta's description, but Battuta did not go into enough detail about the instruments for them to be identifiable.

=== Legendary origin ===
Mandinka oral tradition preserves several legends of the origin of the kora, but all of them claim that the instrument originated in Kaabu. In the stories, the famous Jali Mady Wouling Cissoko purchased the instrument from a djinn or spirit. and was the first person to play the kora; the first song played was kelefaba.

=== Modern history ===
The earliest European reference to the kora in Western literature is in Travels in Interior Districts of Africa (1799) by the Scotsman Mungo Park.

The kora is mentioned in the Senegalese national anthem "Pincez tous vos koras, frappez les balafons".

In the late 20th century, a 25-string model of the kora was developed, though it has been adopted by only a few players, primarily in the region of Casamance, in southern Senegal. Some kora players such as Seckou Keita have double-necked koras, allowing them to switch from one tuning to another instantly, giving them increased flexibility.

The French Benedictine monks of the Keur Moussa Abbey in Senegal (who possibly were the first to introduce guitar machine heads instead of leather rings in the late seventies) conceived a method based on scores to teach the instrument. Brother Dominique Catta, choirmaster of the Keur Moussa Abbey, was the first Western composer who wrote for the kora (solo pieces as well as duets with Western instruments).

An electric instrument modeled on the kora (but made primarily of metal) called the gravikord was invented in the late 20th century by instrument builder and musician Robert Grawi. It has 24 strings and is tuned and played differently than the kora. Another instrument, the gravi-kora, a 21-stringed electro-acoustic instrument, was later developed by Robert Grawi especially for kora players who wanted a modern instrument. Its playing and tuning are the same as the traditional kora. The gravi-kora has been adopted by kora players such as Daniel Berkman, Jacques Burtin, and Foday Musa Suso, who featured it in recordings with jazz innovator Herbie Hancock, with his band Mandingo, and on Suso's New World Power album.

== Tuning ==
Nowadays, koras are increasingly made with guitar machine heads instead of the traditional konso (leather rings). The advantage is that they are much easier to tune. The disadvantage is that this design limits the tuning range of the instrument because string lengths are more fixed and lighter strings are needed to lift it much more than a tone. Learning to tune a traditional kora is arguably as difficult as learning to play it, and many tourists who are entranced by the sound while in West Africa buy koras and then find themselves unable to keep it in tune once they are home, relegating it to the status of ornament. Koras can be converted to replace the leather rings with machine heads. Wooden pegs and harp pegs are also used, but both can still cause tuning problems in damper climates unless made with great skill.

== Images ==
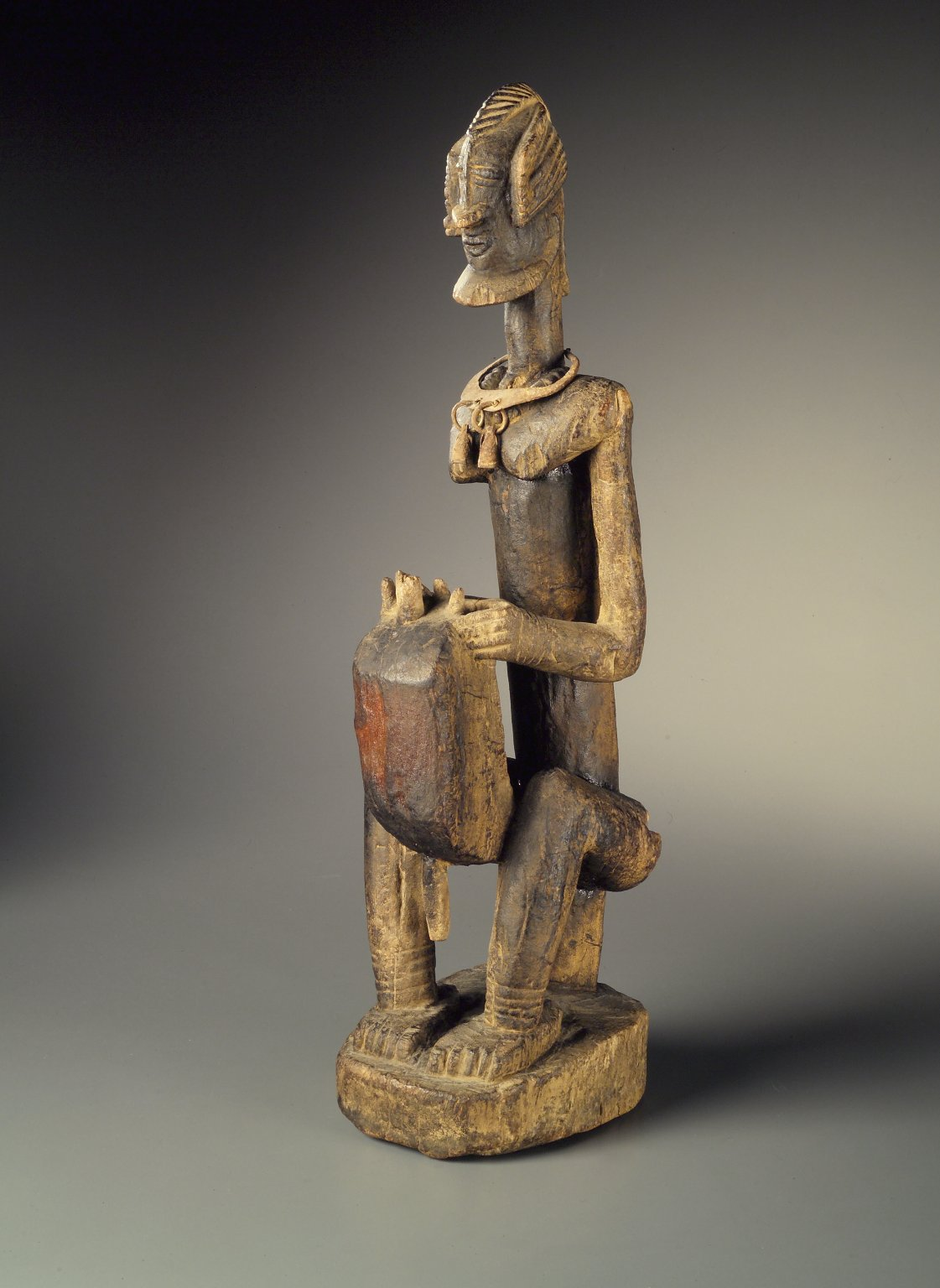
A kora player wearing a korte necklace, from the central northern Bandiagara Escarpment, Mopti Region, Mali. The kora neck and handles appear to have broken off. Late 1700s.

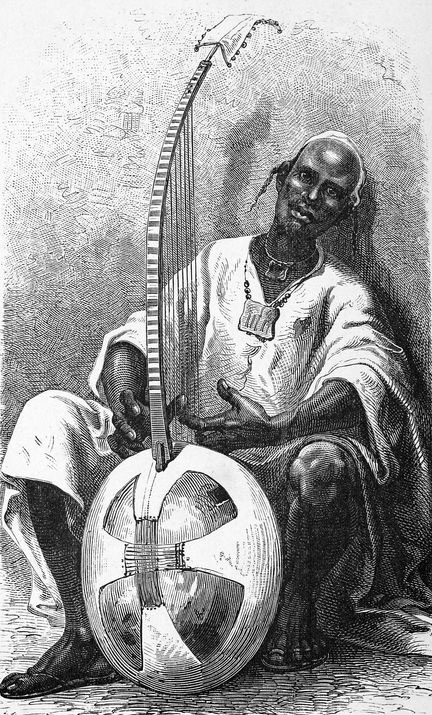
Sambou, jali of Niantanso, Mali, with a Kamalengoni (a relation to the kora) in 1872.

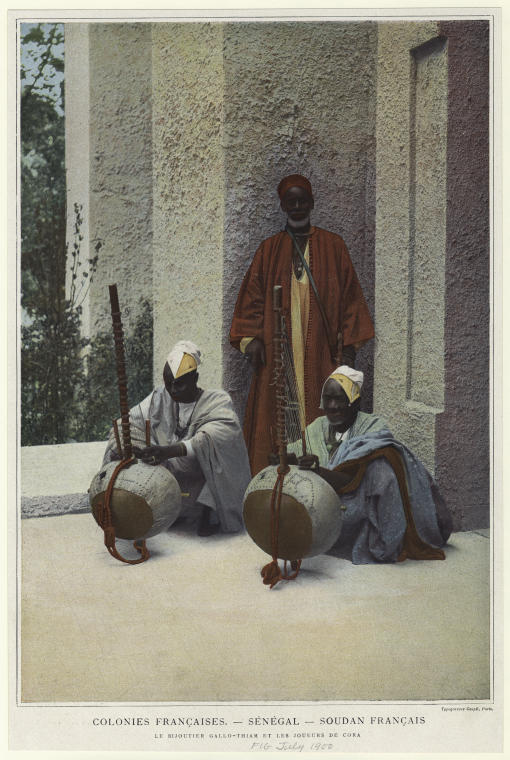
Kora players in Sénégal, 1900. The koras are straight-necked, with handles, carrying cords, tacked skins and small, square soundholes.

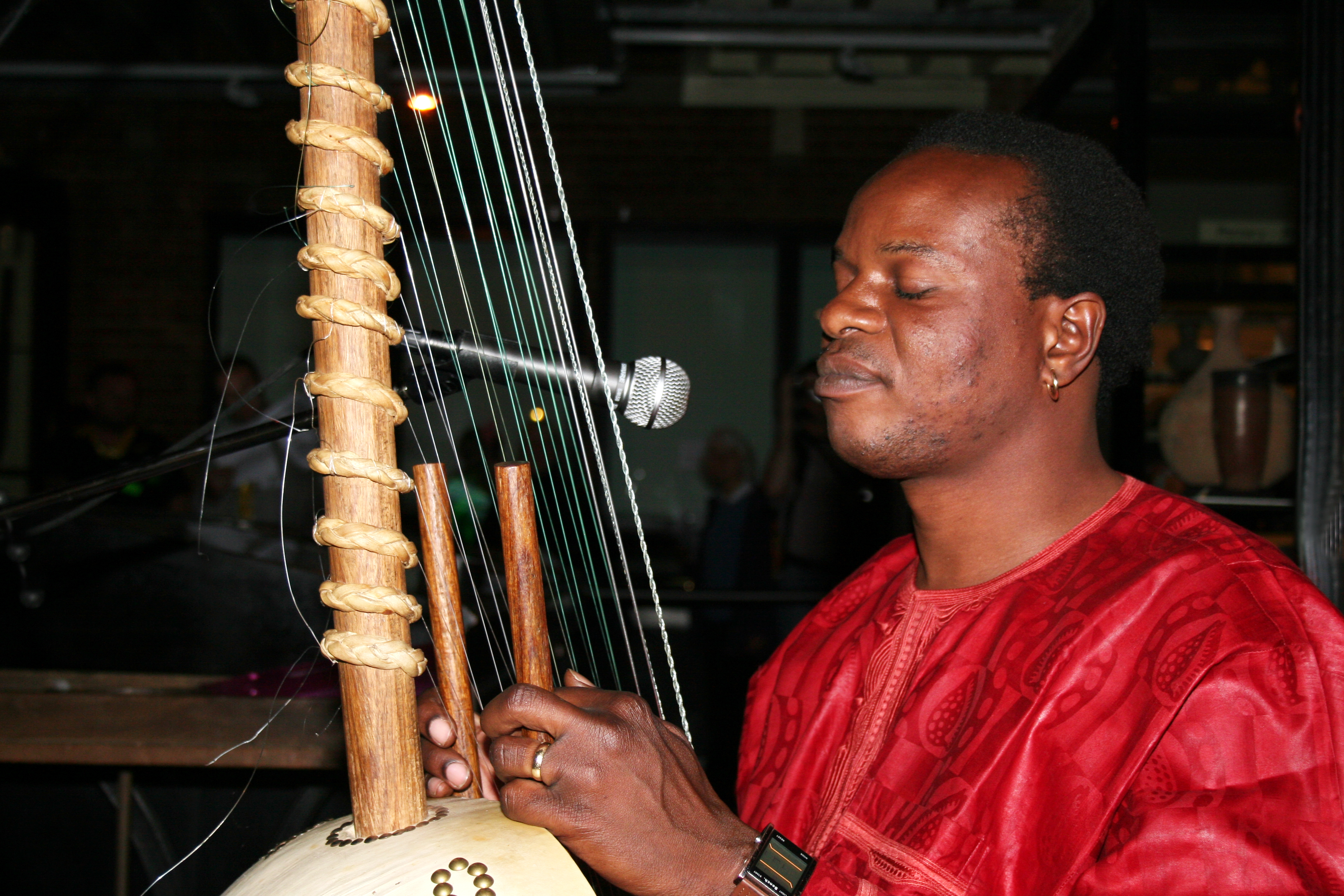
Jali Fily Sissokho playing a 22-string kora, tuned with konso string terminations and strung with nylon monofilament strings, 2008.

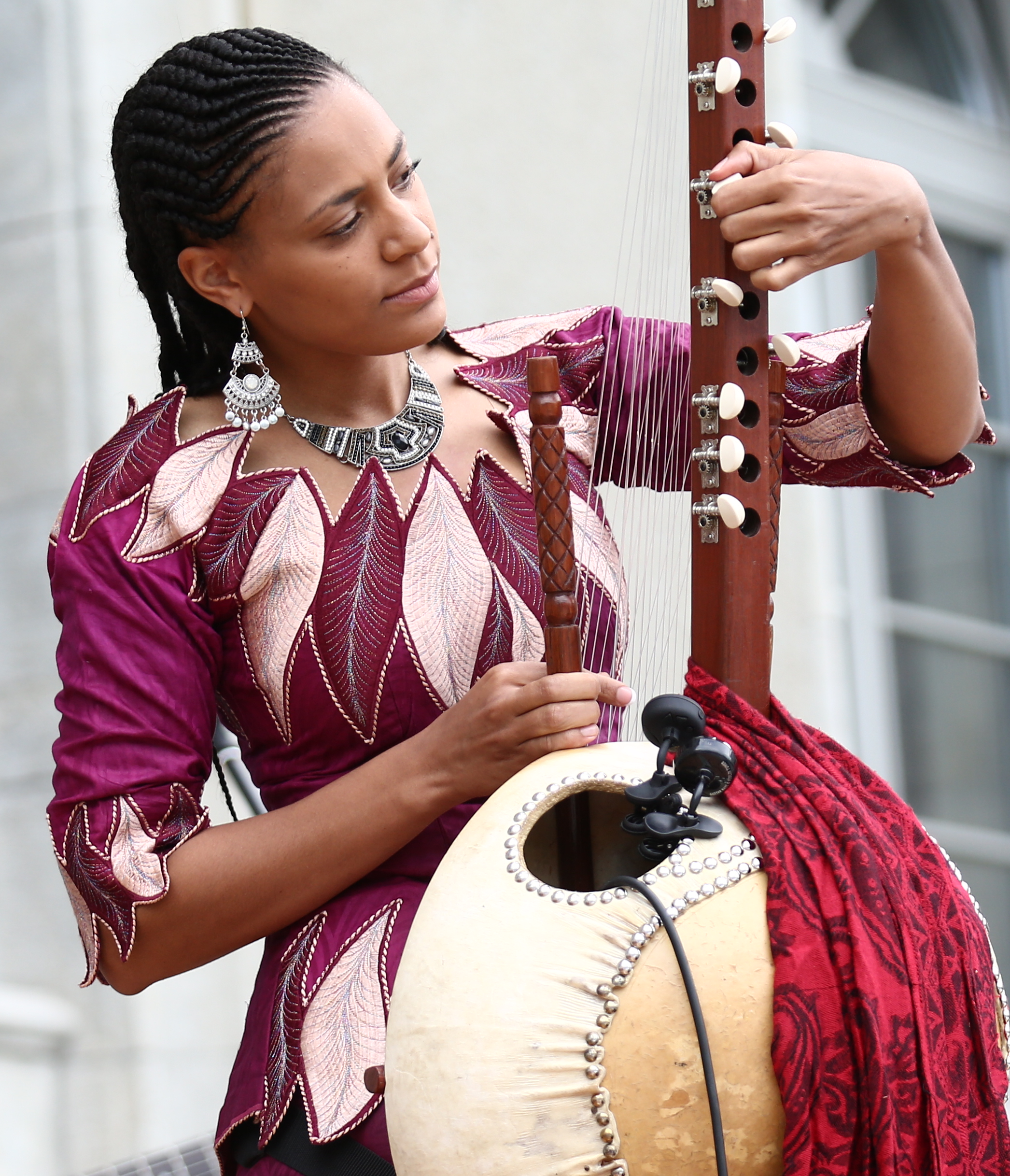
Sona Jobarteh tuning a 22-string kora with open machine head tuners, 2017.

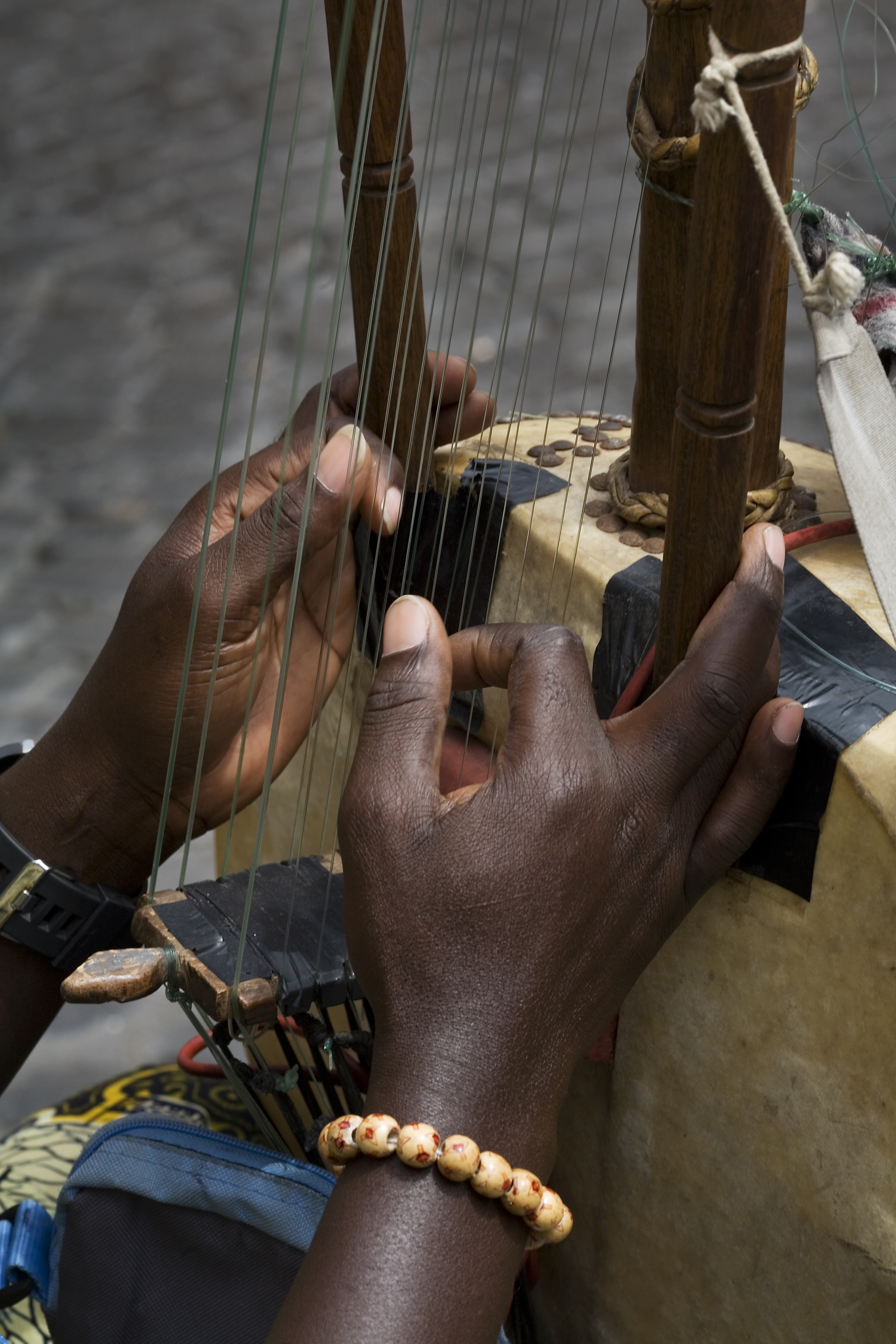
Playing position of a kora, showing how the strings are notched into both sides of the square bridge

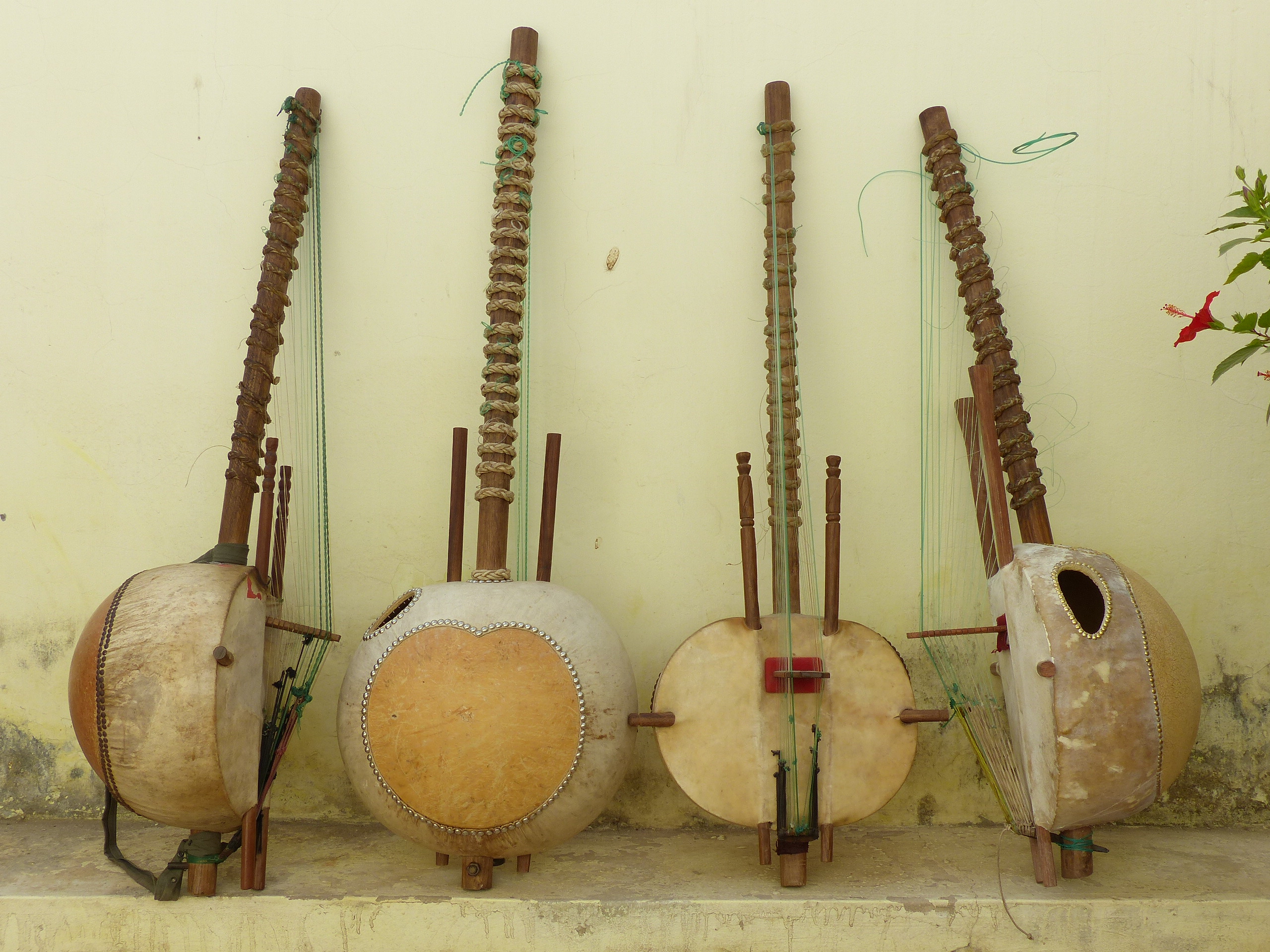
Four koras showing four sides

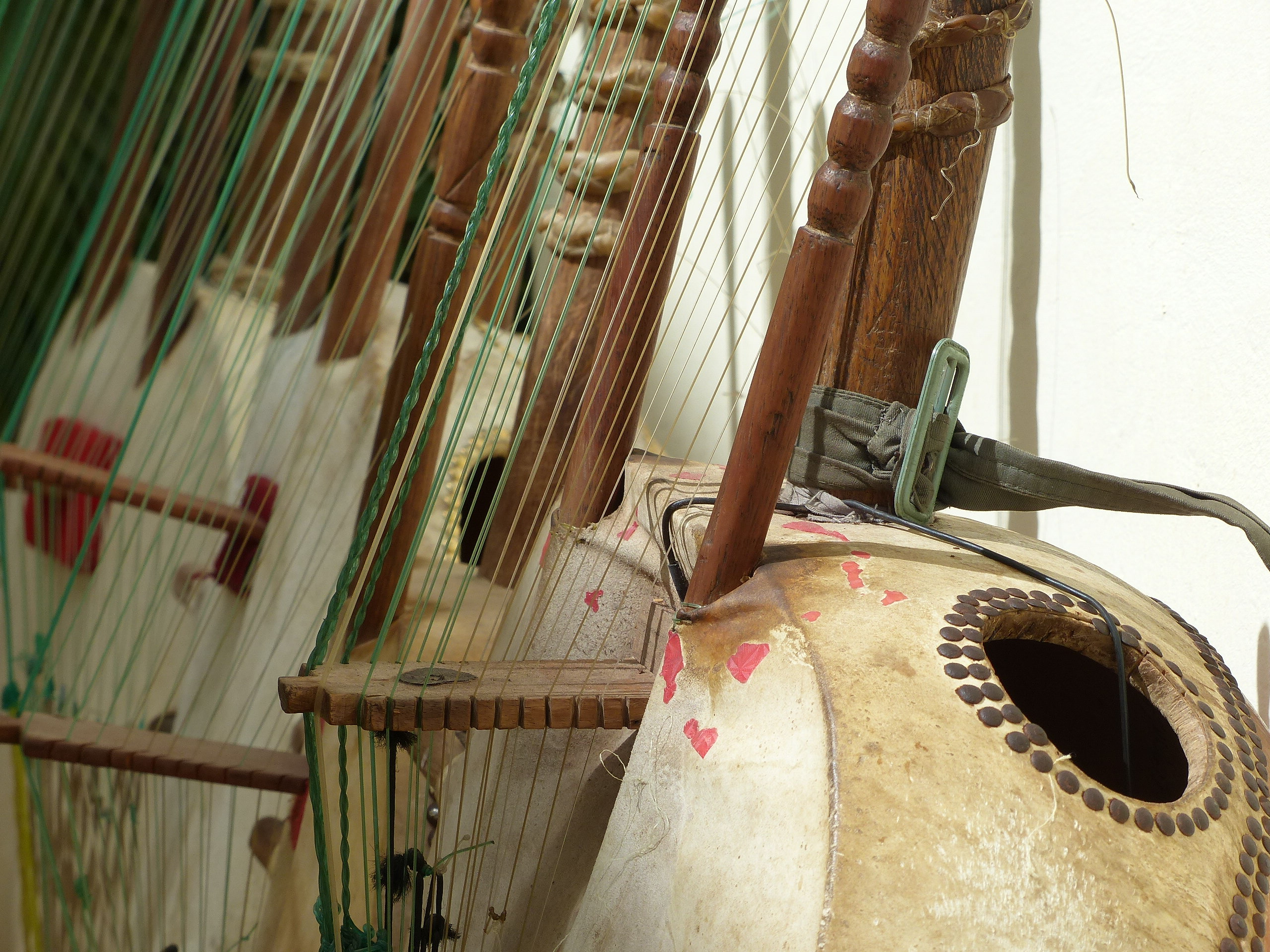
Four koras

== Scores ==
Kora sheet music (fragment of the score of One Thousand Sources, for solo kora, by Jacques Burtin).

As part of the oral tradition of West Africa, music for the kora was not written until the 20th century. Ethnomusicologists were the only ones to record some traditional airs in the normal grand staff method, using the G clef and the F clef.

Today, kora scores are written on a single G clef, following the Keur Moussa notation system. This notation system was created for the kora in the late 1970s by Brother Dominique Catta, a monk of the Keur Moussa Monastery (Senegal). The seven low notes that should be written on the F clef are replaced by Arabic or Roman numerals and written on the G clef.

While jali still compose in the traditional way (without writing scores), some Western musicians began to write partitures for the kora and adopted the Keur Moussa notation system at the beginning of the 1980s. More than 200 scores have already been written for kora solo or kora and Western instruments. Two notable Western composers for the kora are Brother Dominique Catta and Jacques Burtin (France), who wrote most of these scores, though composers like Carole Ouellet (Canada), Brother Grégoire Philippe (Monastère de Keur Moussa) and Sister Claire Marie Ledoux (France) have also contributed with their own original works.

Derek Gripper (Cape Town, South Africa) has transcribed a number of West African kora compositions by Toumani Diabaté and others for performance on western-style classical guitar, and has performed some of these transcriptions on two recordings and in concert from 2012 through 2017.

== Selected discography ==
=== African composers (oral tradition) ===
- Mali: cordes anciennes ("Mali: Ancient Strings"), Sidiki Diabaté, Batourou Sekou Kouyaté and Djelimadi Sissoko, Buda Music, 2000. First published in 1970, this CD was the first album totally devoted to the kora. Sidiki Diabaté was the father of Toumani Diabaté and Mamadou Sidiki Diabaté, and Djelimadi Sissoko was the father of Ballaké Sissoko. Toumani and Ballaké recorded New Ancient Strings - Nouvelles Cordes Anciennes in 1999 (Hannibal), as a tribute to their fathers.
- Gambie : l'art de la kora, Jali Nyama Suso, edited by Roderic Knight, Ocora, 1996. First published in 1972, this CD is also a historical recording.
- Kora Melodies from the Republic of The Gambia, West Africa, Alhaji Bai Konte, Recorded and produced by Marc D. Pevar; photography and notes by Marc and Susan Pever. Rounder Records 5001.
- Jali Kunda - Griots of West Africa & Beyond, Ellipsis Arts, 1996. A book and a CD edited by Foday Musa Suso, produced by Bill Laswell. Photographs by Daniel Lainé. A journey through traditional kora music and three original meetings: kora and piano ("Spring Waterfall" by Foday Musa Suso and Philip Glass); kora and synthesizers ("Lanmbasy Dub'", with Bill Laswell, bass, and Jeff Bova, synthesizers); kora and saxophone ("Samma", a duet with jazz saxophonist Pharoah Sanders).
- The Mandé Variations, Toumani Diabaté, World Circuit, 2008. Twenty years after his first CD, Kaira (Hannibal, 1988) - the first CD ever recorded with solo kora pieces without any song, Toumani Diabate alternates traditional pieces on a kora with leather rings and his own creations with a special tuning on a kora with wooden pegs.

=== Western composers (written music) ===
- Quand renaît le matin, Abbaye de Keur Moussa, Art et Musique, 2007. First published in 1991, this album gathers pieces composed and performed by Brother Dominique Catta and Carole Ouellet: solo kora pieces, songs with kora accompaniment and a Concerto for flute and three koras. There is also a piece composed by Brother Grégoire for three koras differently tuned and played by one musician.
- Le Jour des Merveilles, Jacques Burtin, 3-CD Box Set, Bayard Musique, 2009. Pieces for solo kora, duets with cello, viola, guitar and koto, suites for flute, guitar and three koras.

== Notable players ==
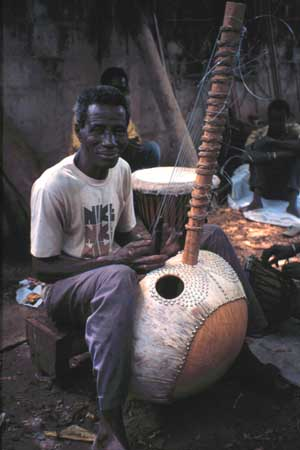
Master kora-maker Alieu Suso of the Gambia

=== France ===
- Jacques Burtin (France)

=== Gambia ===
- Foday Musa Suso (Gambia, United States), recorded with Herbie Hancock
- Jali Nyama Suso (Gambia)
- Jalli Lamin Kuyateh (Gambia/The Netherlands)
- Sona Jobarteh (Gambia/United Kingdom)
- Bai Konte (Gambia)
- Dembo Konte (Gambia)
- Jaliba Kuyateh (Gambia)
- Lamin Saho (Gambia)
- Papa Susso (Gambia)
- Suntou Susso (Gambia/UK)

=== Guinea ===
- Tasana Camara (Guinea)
- Djeli Moussa Diawara, also known as Jali Musa Jawara (Guinea, now playing a 32-stringed kora)
- N'Faly Kouyate (Guinea)
- Prince Diabate (Guinea)

=== Haiti ===
- Guylene Solon (Haiti/United States)

=== Mali ===
- Toumani Diabaté (Mali)
- Sidiki Diabaté (Mali)
- Mamadou Sidiki Diabaté (Mali)
- Mamadou Diabaté (Mali)
- Kandia Kouyaté (Mali)
- Moussa Kouyate (Mali)
- Ballaké Sissoko (Mali)

=== Nigeria ===
- Tunde Jegede (Nigeria/United Kingdom)

=== Senegal ===
- Soriba Kouyate (Senegal)
- Ablaye Cissoko (Senegal)
- Kadialy Kouyaté (Senegal, United Kingdom)
- Momi Maiga (Senegal)

=== United Kingdom ===
- Seckou Keita (United Kingdom)
- Adam Doughty (United Kingdom)

=== United States ===
- William Parker (United States)
- Justin Perkins (United States)
- Nasir Dickerson (United States)

== See also ==
- Griot
- Mandinka people

== Bibliography ==
- Eric Charry, Mande Music : Traditional and Modern Music of the Maninka and Mandinka of Western Africa, University of Chicago Press, 2000.
- Ousmane Sow Huchard, La kora : objet-témoin de la civilisation manding : essai d'analyse organologique d'une harpe-luth africaine, Presses universitaires de Dakar, Dakar, 2000.
