= List of musical instruments by Hornbostel–Sachs number: 321.33 =

This is a list of instruments by Hornbostel–Sachs number, covering those instruments that are classified under 321.33 under that system. These instruments are also known as semi-spike lutes, tanged lutes and internal spike lutes. These instruments are made of a resonator and string bearer that are physically united, with strings in parallel to the sound table and a handle which is also the string bearer and which passes through the resonator but does not pierce its tail end.

== West African griot lutes ==
Tanged lutes are common in East Africa, as are a closely related class of instrument called spike lutes. These are instruments in which the handle does extends all the way through the resonator. A hereditary class of West African musicians, griots, play tanged lutes, and no other form of stringed instrument; non-griot performers in West Africa play a mixture of both spike lutes and tanged lutes. The term griot lute thus typically refers to these tanged lutes of East Africa.

The resonator of East African lutes may be made of wood, metal (such as a discarded can) or a half-calabash gourd. Griot lutes are exclusively wood, while non-griot lutes occur in all three categories. Typically, calabash lutes have no more than two strings, while the wooden instruments generally have more.

Griot lutes tend to be wooden troughs, either boat- (naviform) or figure-8-shaped. Lutes used by griots have a V- or fan-shaped bridge, a feature unique to East African lutes, while non-griot lutes use cylindrical bridges; a few use two-footed bridges in the shape of an upside-down "u", while the Hausa wase places the bridge under the head, creating a ridged lump upon which the strings rest. Non-griot lutes are not restricted by heredity, and are used for many social purposes, most commonly hunting. It likely that one or more of these instruments is the ancestor of the African American banjo.

== Classification ==
3: Instruments in which sound is produced by one or more vibrating strings (chordophones, string instruments).

32: Instruments in which the resonator and string bearer are physically united and can not be separated without destroying the instrument

321: Instruments in which the strings run in a plane parallel to the sound table (lutes)

321.3: Instruments in which the string bearer is a plain handle (handle lutes)

321.33: Instrument in which the handle extends into but does not pass completely through the resonator (tanged lutes)

321.331: Instrument whose body is shaped like a bowl (tanged bowl lutes)
321.332: Instrument whose body is shaped like a box (tanged box lutes)

These instruments may be classified with a suffix, based on how the strings are caused to vibrate.

- 4: Hammers or beaters
- 5: Bare hands and fingers
- 6: Plectrum
- 7: Bowing
  - 71: Using a bow
  - 72: Using a wheel
  - 73: Using a ribbon
- 8: Keyboard
- 9: Using a mechanical drive

Instrument	Tradition	Hornbostel–Sachs classification	Description
gimbri guinbri, guimbri, gimbri, ginibri	Moroccan Arab	321.331 321.332	multiple styles considered same half-spike or tanged bowl lute, bowl carved from wood, with tuning pegs, possibly teardrop shaped half-spike or tanged box lute, constructed box or metal can
Xalam or khalam bappe, diassare, gúlúm, gurmi, hoddu / kologo, Khalam/Xalam, komsa, koni, kontigi, konting, molo, ndere, 'ngonifola, ngoni, tidinit	Music of West Africa	321.33	
