= Dan Maraya =

Hausa musical artist

Danmaraya
- Adamu Danmaraya Jos, holding a kuntigi, an African lute from Niger and Nigeria and used by the Hausa people.

Background information
- Also known as: Adamu Danmaraya Jos
- Born: Adamu Wayya; 1946; Bukuru, Nigeria
- Died: 20 June 2015 Jos, Nigeria
- Occupations: Griot, recording artist, poet, philosopher, philanthropist
- Instrument: Kuntigi

Ɗanmaraya Jos (also known as Adamu Danmaraya Jos; born Adamu Wayya in 1946 – 20 June 2015) was a Nigerian Hausa griot known for playing the kuntigi. He was also remembered as a man who did not limit his praise singing to the rich and famous, but sang praises for common people as well.

He was a Member of the Order of the Niger (MON), an Officer of the Order of the Niger (OON) and a recipient of the Nigerian Federal Republic Medal, 1st class. He was conferred with an honorary doctorate degree by the University of Jos. A recording artist, by 1986 he had recorded at least 150 LPs and singles and composed 500 songs.

== Life ==
Danmaraya Jos, whose name means "The Orphan of Jos", was born in 1946 in Bukuru, near Jos in Plateau State, Nigeria. His birth name is Adamu Wayya. His father died shortly after his birth and his mother died while he was still an infant, hence the name by which everyone knows him. Danmaraya's father had been a court musician for the Sarkin Hausawa of Bukuru. After the father's death, the Emir (or Sarkin Hausawa) took Dan Maraya under his care when his parents died.

Danmaraya showed an early interest in music and came under the influence of local professional musicians. During a trip to Maiduguri while he was still a pre-teen, he was impressed by musicians some playing with the Kuntigi instrument, upon his return to Jos, he made a kuntigi, with which he has accompanied himself ever since.

Danmaraya was a vocalist, singing while accompanying himself on a small Nigerian lute called a kuntigi. He also was skilled with the kotso drum and kalungu drum (Hausa talking drum), the garaya 2-stringed lute or guitar, the molo 3-stringed lute or guitar, and the goge Nigerian violin, having learned them in training for his profession as a griot.

The kuntigi is a small, single-stringed lute which Danmaraya plucked, and also drummed the skin soundboard with his fingers. The body of his instrument was made from an oval-shaped sardine can covered with goatskin. Danmaraya and other kuntigi players are solo performers who accompany themselves with a rapid ostinato (a continually repeated musical phrase or rhythm) on the kuntigi. During instrumental interludes they repeat a fixed pattern for the song they are playing, but while singing, they will often change the notes of the pattern to parallel the melody they are singing.

== Griot profession ==
Dan Maraya chose the griot profession when he was seven-years old, having been told that his decreased father was a royal drummer. By the end of his life he had toured internationally, performing in the United States, the Netherlands, Germany, Cuba, Trinidad, Jamaica, Guyana, Venezuela, Brazil, and Ethiopia. He was also a performer at Festac 77 (the Second World Black and African Festival of Arts and Culture) in Lagos, Nigeria. He was of such prominence that he was performing in national events for Nigeria; his last concert before he fell sick was at the Peoples Democratic Party (PDP) fund-raising dinner.

Like most griot professional musicians, the mainstay of Dan Maraya's repertoire was praise singing, but Dan Maraya singled out his personal heroes rather than the rich and famous. His first song was "Wak'ar Karen Mota" ["Song of the Driver's Mate"] in praise of the young men who get passengers in and out of minivan buses and do the dirty work of changing tires, pushing broken-down vans, and the like.

His repertoire also included "songs about natural phenomena such as death, luck, wealth etc" as well as songs about "anti-societal acts." The songs were flavored by his perception as a Hausa.

As a griot, he sang songs of both praise and satirical criticism. During the Nigerian Civil War, he composed numerous songs in praise of soldiers of the federal army and incorporated vivid accounts of scenes from the war in his songs. When the civil war ended with the victory of the federal government, Dan Maraya sang "Munafukan Yaki..." ("The Hypocrites of War") lampooning governments and international figures that sided with Biafra.

Many of his songs incorporate social commentary. These include the songs on marriage, which probably date from the early 1970s. One might argue that they are really one large song, and in performance, Dan Maraya incorporates lines from each of them. However, the recordings that serve as the basis for this study have three distinct musical settings, and the songs themselves have three different themes: "Jawabin Aure" ["Discourse on Marriage"] lists the problems attendant in divorce and admonishes married couples to try to patch up their differences. "Auren Dole" ["Forced Marriage"] decries the practice of families arranging marriages for their daughters rather than letting them decide on their own mates. "Gulma-Wuya" ["The Busybody"] describes a neighborhood gossip who works in collusion with a boka (a practitioner in casting spells, removing evil spirits, etc.) to disrupt marriages by sowing dissension between women and their husbands. The latter song is amusing in that Dan Maraya performs it as a drama, imitating the voices of the different characters as they speak, a technique that he has used in other songs as well.

== Recordings ==
=== Individual songs ===
- Auren Dole [Forced Marriage]
- Gulma-Wuya [The Busybody]
- Jawabin Aure [Discourse on Marriage]
- Kidan Kashewa and Wakar Keren Mota III [Killing Music and Car Music III]
- Munafukan Yaki (Wallahi Kun Tabe) [translation: War Hypocrites (By God You Are Gone)]
- Wak'ar Karen Mota [Song of the Driver's Mate]

=== Albums ===
- 1986. Kudi Masu Gida Rana [album, Polydor POLP 151]
  - Kudi Masu Gida Rana [Money Homeowners Day]
  - Wakar Shari'a [Song of Sharia]
  - Alhaji Shaaibu Jagaf
  - Wakar Hankali [Song of the Mind]
  - Alhaji Bako Doma
  - Wakar PolyGram [Polygram song]
