= Daniel Laemouahuma Jatta =

Gambian musician and scholar

Daniel Laemouahuma Jatta is a Jola scholar and musician from Mandinary, Gambia, who pioneered the research and documentation of the akonting, a Jola folk lute, as well as the related Manjago folk lute, the buchundu, in the mid-1980s. Prior to Jatta's work, these instruments were largely unknown outside the rural villages of the Senegambia region of West Africa.

== Contribution to knowledge of West African music ==
In the 1960s, scholars and writers began to seriously examine the traditional music of West Africa in their search for the roots of the blues, jazz, and the other music forms that had emerged in the African diaspora. However, in this quest there was very little study and documentation of West African stringed instruments done other than in the overall context of general musical and cultural traditions. For the most part, the only stringed instruments to receive specific attention were those of the griots, such as their plucked lutes (e.g. the Mande ngoni, the Wolof xalam, the Fula hoddu, the Soninke gambare, and the kora (the 21-string harp-lute of the Mandinka griots).

Griots are male members of hereditary music and word artisan castes found in certain West African Islamized peoples with similar tripartite caste systems. The griot phenomenon is limited to the various peoples of the Mande language family - some 53 related ethnic groups, such as the Bamana (or Bambara), Mandinka, Malinke, Susu, Soninke, and so on - as well as the non-Mande Wolof, the western Fulas or Fulani (Fula: Fulɓe; French: Peuls), Songhai (also Songhay), Sereer, Lebu, and Tukulóor.)

In 2000, Jatta presented his research findings and introduced the Jola akonting at the Third Annual Banjo Collectors Gathering, an annual international conference of the foremost collectors and scholars of 19th and early 20th century banjos. The annual Banjo Collectors Gatherings also serve as the principal forums for the presentations of new research on the banjo's history and organology.

Jatta's presentation, in which he performed on the akonting and showed film footage of other Jola musicians playing the instrument, made for quite a sensation. Up until that point, the conventional wisdom was that the wooden-bodied plucked lutes exclusive to the West African griots, such as the Mande ngoni and the Wolof xalam, were the archetypes for the earliest forms of the banjo, first made and played by enslaved West Africans in the New World, from the 17th century on. Jatta's proposition that gourd-bodied non-griot folk and artisan lutes - like the Jola akonting (Senegal, Gambia, Guinea-Bissau), the Manjago buchundu (Gambia, Guinea-Bissau), the Gwari kaburu (Nigeria), and the Frafra koliko (Ghana), to name but a few - were the more likely candidates was revolutionary.

Since then, many museums around the world have updated their collections to include the akonting and other members of the West African folk/artisan lute family, while banjo historians and ethnomusicologists have begun to broaden the range of their focus to include these instruments as well those used by griots.
