= Xalam =

Traditional West African lute

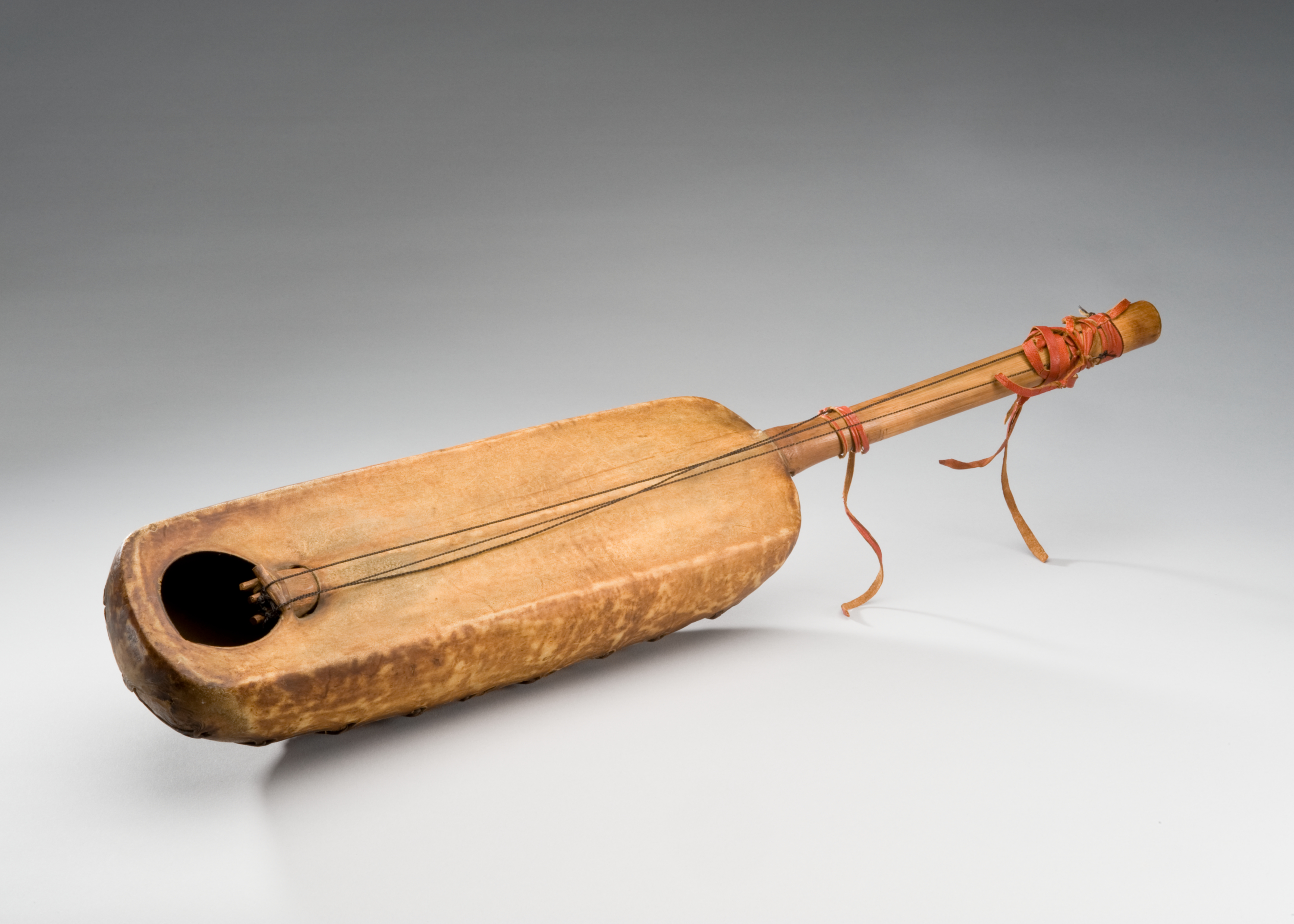
- Molo, African lute, in the collection of the Smithsonian. The biggest visible difference between the molo and a griot lute like the xalam is the bridge, which is cylindrical on this instrument, but has a fan shape on the xalam.

String instrument
- Other names: bappe, diassare, gúlúm, gurmi, hoddu / kologu, Khalam/Xalam, komsa, koni, kontigi, konting, molo, ndere, ngonifola, ngoni, tidinit
- Hornbostel–Sachs classification: 321.33 (Tanged or Semi-spike lute: Chordophone, the plane of strings runs parallel with the sound table, the string bearer is a plain handle and passes "diametrically" through the resonator, the resonator consists of a natural or carved out bowl, in which the handle extends into but does not pass completely through the resonator)

Related instruments
- akonting; garaya; gumbri/sintir; ngoni

Xalam (in Serer, khalam in Wolof, and Molo in Dagbani and Zarma) is a traditional lute from West Africa with 1 to 5 strings. The xalam is commonly played in Mali, Gambia, Senegal, Niger, Northern Nigeria, Northern Ghana, Burkina Faso, Mauritania, and Western Sahara. The xalam and its variants are known by various names in other languages, including bappe, diassare, hoddu (Pulaar), koliko (Gurunsi), kologo (Frafra), komsa, kontigi, gurmi, garaya (Hausa), koni, konting (Mandinka), molo (Songhay/Zarma), ndere, ngoni (Bambara), and tidinit (Hassaniyya and Berber).

In Wolof, a person who plays the xalam is called a xalamkat (a word composed of the verbal form of xalam, meaning "to play the xalam", and the agentive suffix -kat, thus meaning "one who xalams"). In Mande, this is ngonifola or konting fola. In Hausa, this is mai gurmi or mai kontigi.

== Construction and tuning ==
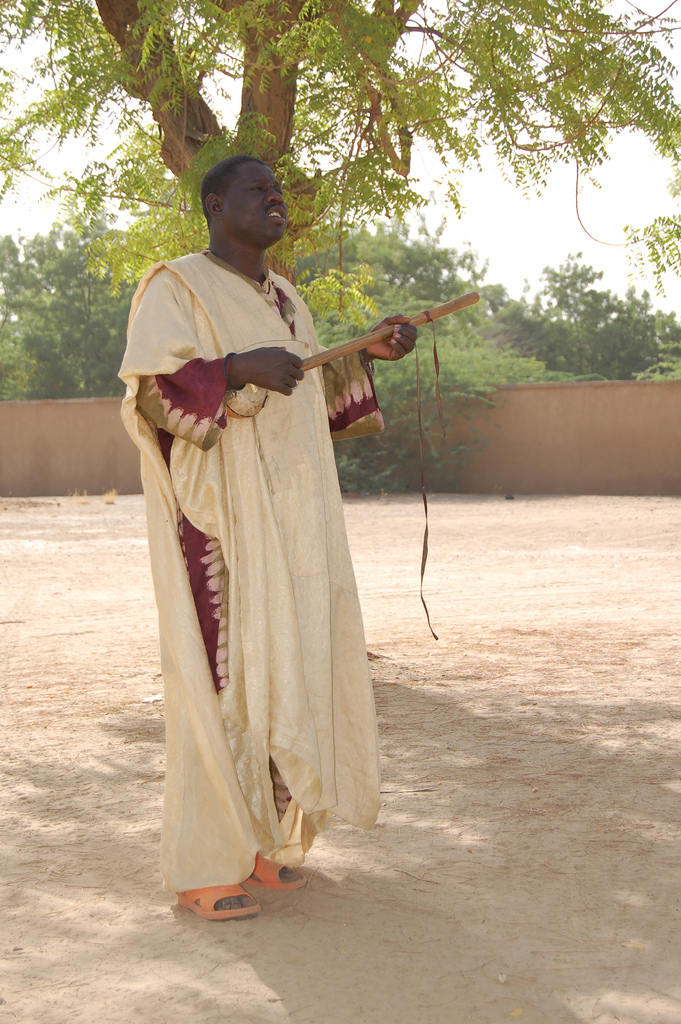
A Hausa Griot playing the gurmi (a Hausa variant of the xalam with a spherical body) in Diffa, Niger.

The xalam, in its standard form, is a simple lute chordophone with one to five strings. The wooden body (soundbox) membranophone of the instrument is oval-shaped and covered with the hide of cattle. The strings of the xalam are typically made of two or three tightly wound strands of low-gauge nylon fishing line; these strings are fixed to the instrument's wooden neck by long and narrow leather strips and to its wooden bridge by cotton strings. By moving these strips, the instrument's tune can be adjusted. The xalam usually has two main melody strings that are fingered by the left hand (like the strings of a guitar or banjo) and two to three supplementary strings of fixed pitch. Most xalam players construct their own xalams, although they usually call on woodworkers (lawbe) to carve the body, neck, and bridge for them.

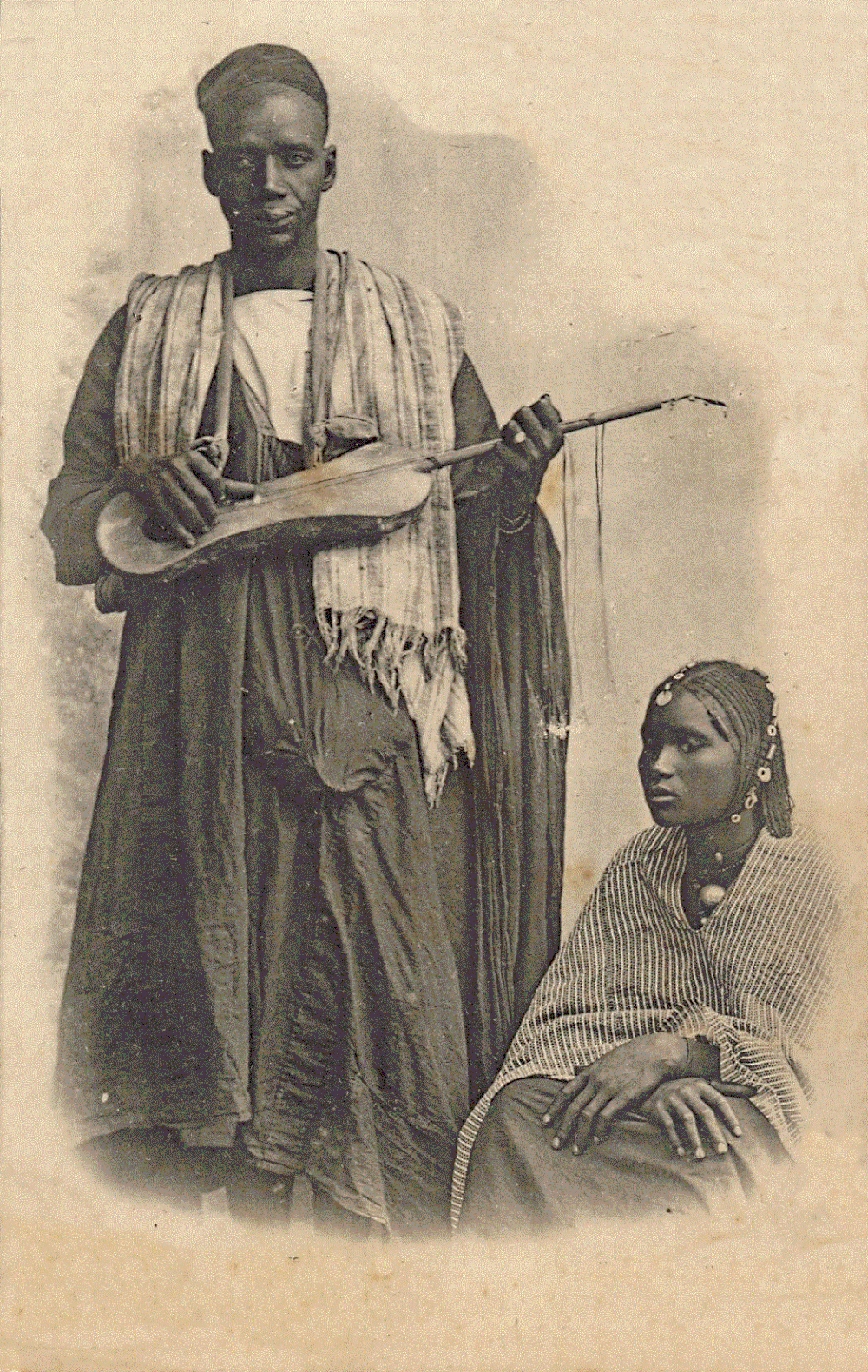
Senegalese khalamkat holding a khalam (xalam, hoddu, molo). Circa 1890-1905.

In most Wolof-speaking parts of Senegal, the xalam has three principal tunings, all of which involve tuning the two main strings a perfect fourth apart. In the first tuning (ci suuf or low), the main strings are tuned 1 and 4 ( 1 being the fundamental of a major scale), with three supplementary strings being tuned an octave higher to 1´, 2´, and 3´. The second tuning (ci kow or high) uses the same string intervals but the fundamental is placed a minor second above the higher melody string, meaning that the open main strings now play the role of 3 and 6, with the supplementary strings acting as 3´ and 4#, the highest supplementary string usually being ignored. In the third tuning (ardin), the fundamental is a minor third above the lowest main string and the main strings are tuned 6 and 2, with supplementary strings tuned to 5 and 1´. The third supplementary string is either ignored or is tuned to 6 or 2´. If playing in an ensemble, the ardin xalam's main strings are tuned a minor third below the cu suuf xalam, and the ci kow xalam is tuned a major third above the ci suuf xalam to ensure that the fundamentals of each xalam coincide. (Thus, if the ci suuf xalam's lowest note were C, the ardins lowest note would be a low A and the ci kow xalam's lowest note would be E.)

== Players ==
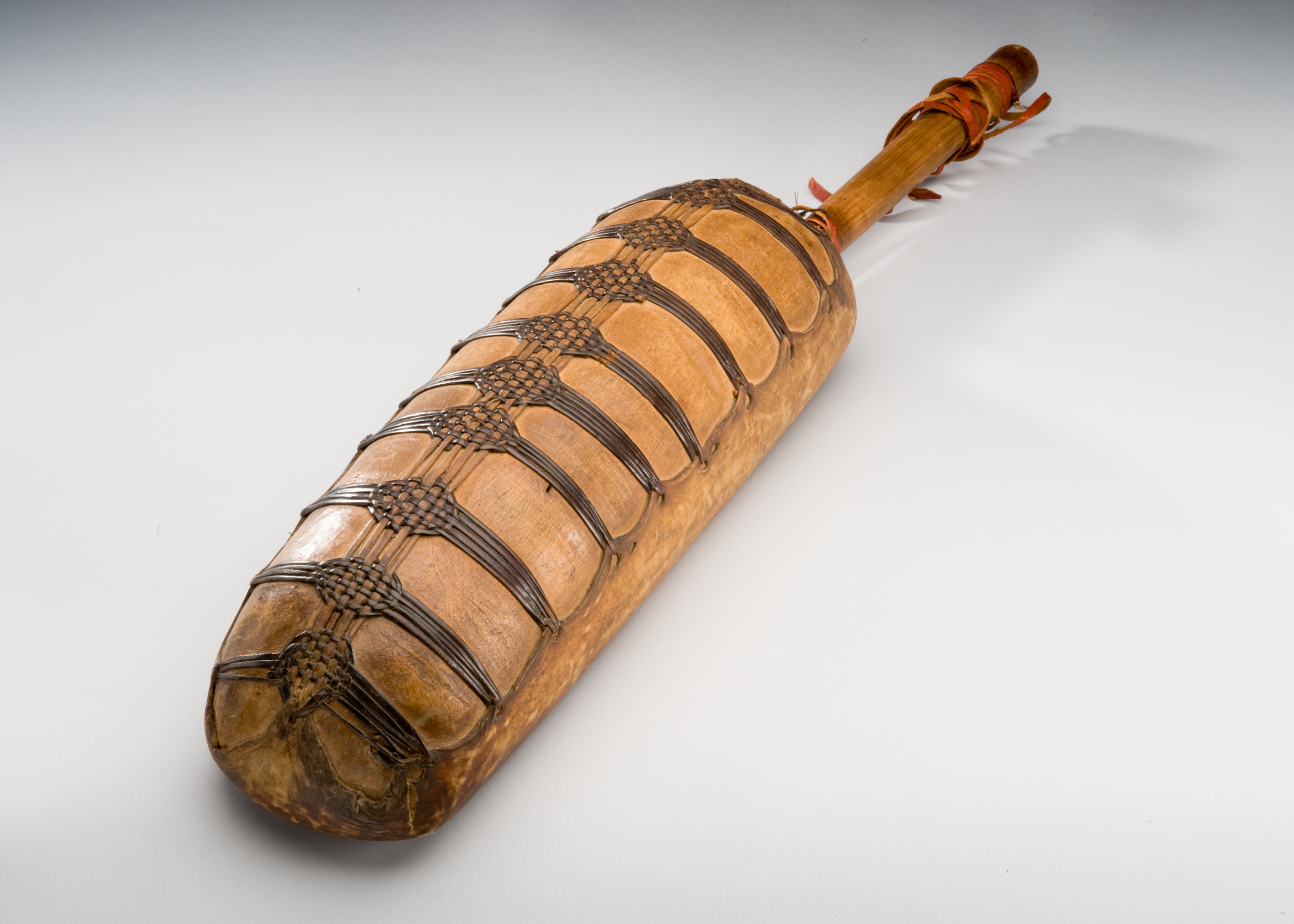
Back of a molo (lute, showing how the skin soundboard is held on)

In most areas the xalam is played by male griots, or praise singers who are born into the profession. It most often acts as a solo or duo instrument to accompany praise songs and historical recitations, and in some areas it may form part of a larger group including kora, drums, and calabashes. It is traditionally heard at weddings, infant naming ceremonies, and (always with amplification) is now a common member of folklore ensembles, popular mbalax groups, and ndaga variety shows.

== See also ==
- Akonting
- Cheick Hamala Diabate
- Kora
- Krar
- Ngoni
- Rubab
