= Praise name =

A praise name is a figurative or descriptive name that is given to either a person, animal, clan, deity, or inanimate object. They are usually laudatory and refer to a quality or action, though in the pursuit of essentialising something they can be derogatory. They often comprise the basis for praise poetry, serve as permanent titles, or as terms of formal address that reinforce status.

== Description ==
Praise names are most often given to people, and royal courts tended to have a professional poet or group of poets who composed and sung them for the ruler. They can be metaphorical and draw comparisons to animals and natural phenomena. Yoruba praise names (oríkì) serve as titles which can be given by friends, though are usually given by drummers. In Sotho culture, it is common for someone to compose a praise name for themselves. In Dogon culture, children receive a praise name (tige) which serves as a personal motto. In Southern Africa, praise names for someone's clan are used on formal occasions (eg. mokzvena (based on kwena which means "crocodile") can be used for anyone belonging to the Tswana Kwena clan).

In Acholi culture, praise names are often given to long-horned cattle. Hausa praise names (kirari) can be given to inanimate objects, such as the molo (a three-stringed lute). Praise names can also be given to deities, such as the Somali names Bogsiiye ("the Curer") and Baahilaawe ("He who is without need or want") for Allah, the Igbo name Chukwuemeka ("God has done well") for Chukwu, or the Shona name Dzivaguru ("Great Pool", in reference to rainmaking) for Mwari. Among Fulani, praise names are known as jammoore.

== List of praise names ==
- "Dicko" or "Dikko": All members of the Jelgobe noble lineage, part of the Jelgooji Fulani, are granted this name. According to researcher Paul Riesman, Dicko as a praise name "suggests fierceness, resourcefulness, and self-sufficieny".
- "Siise": This praise name is associated with a few Jelgooji Fulani families which are traditionally deemed to be moodibbo, i.e. people esteemed for their learning. Usually, people become moodibbo only by studying, but the members of families with Siise praise names are always regarded as moodibbo, even when they do not follow a scholarly pursuit.
