= Gurmi (lute) =

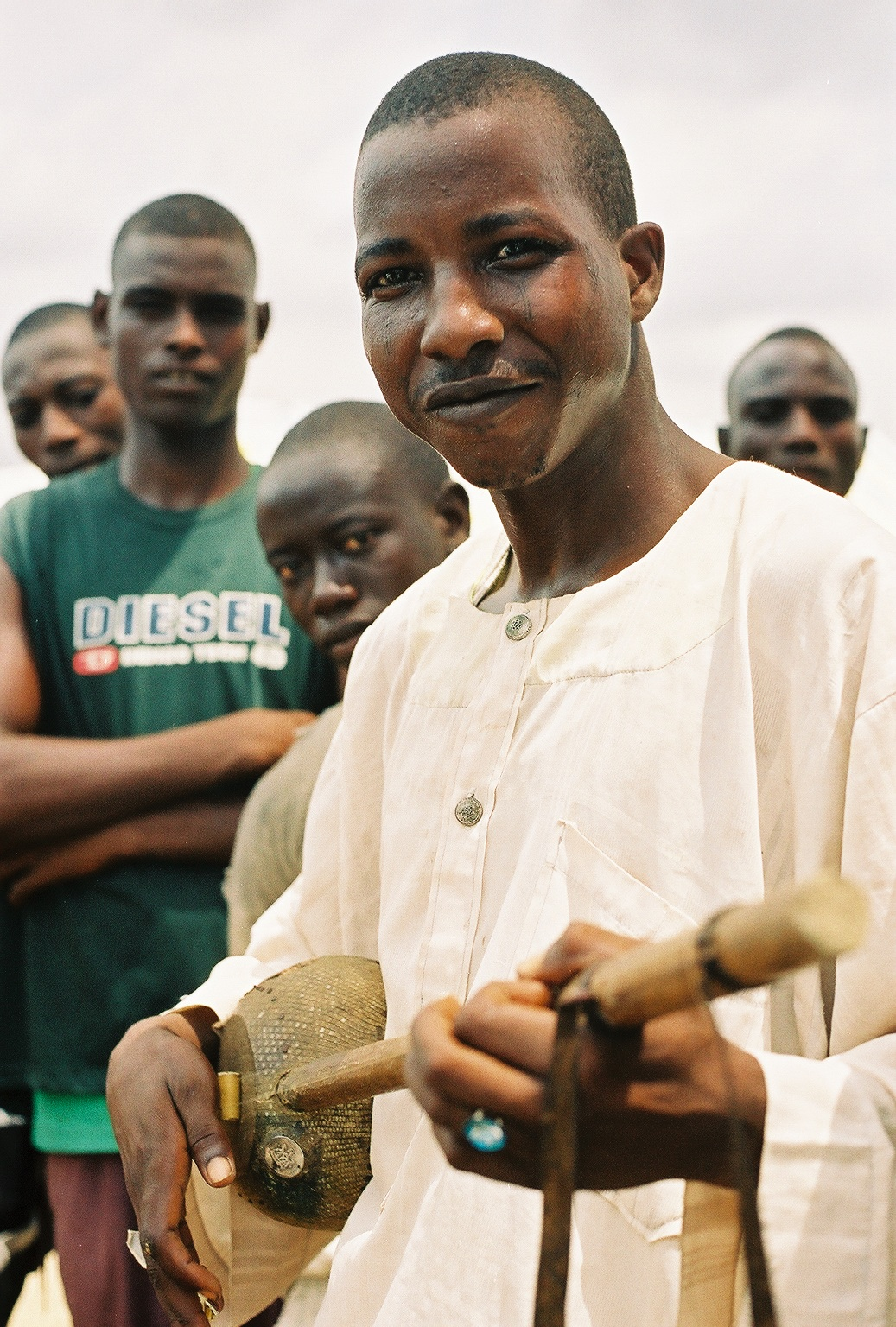
Hausa musician playing a gurmi

The gurmi is a two or three-stringed lute of the Hausa people of northern Nigeria. May also be called gurumi or kumbo. In looking at the two-finger playing style used by musicians who play the gurmi, researchers have listed it as a possible relative to the banjo. Researchers have talked about the gurmi and gurumi as if these are two different but similar instruments.

The instrument is also played by Toubou people and "other peoples of Niger and northern Nigeria."

== Details ==
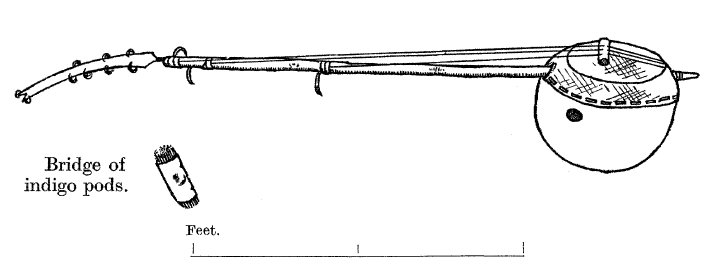
A gurmi as illustrated by P. G. Harris in his 1932 article Notes on Drums and Musical Instruments Seen in Sokoto Province, Nigeria.

It has a soundbox made from a half calabash or gourd, the opening covered with hide for a soundboard. The neck pierces the calabash, its end poking out the bottom of the instrument. Strings are secured to the stump of stick at the bottom and run across a bridge on the hide soundboard to the neck. The strings are secured to the neck by tying them to tuning rings, separate strings or bands tied around the neck.

While a member of the xalam family of instruments, the gurmi is specific to the Hausa people. Unlike the xalam, with its oval shaped soundbox, the gurmi's soundbox is round (the shape of the gourd which is its body). They have a rounded dowel neck.

The instrument has been traditionally played by Hausa men to make songs that praise wrestlers. It may be played as a solo instrument or accompany singing.

== Variations and relatives ==
Researchers have paired the gurmi with a number of African lutes, many with names that may be related to the name gurmi. The instruments are "full-spike lutes" meaning that the neck goes all the way through the instrument, poking through both sides of the gourd or calabash resonator. Another alternative, separating these from other African lutes is the "semi-spike lutes" such as the xalam, in which the end of the neck pokes out through the soundboard (instead of out through the side of the gourd) and acts as a bridge.

These full-spike lutes include:

- Gambare. Soninke people of Mali.
- Gullum. Kilba people, Nigeria. 3 strings, round calabash soundbox, soundhole in side, a bridge that is hollow and "contains seeds". Used at death ceremonies.
- Gulum, gulom. Kotoko people, Chad, Cameroon. 3 strings, "hemispherical" calabash soundbox, covered with cowhide, laced to instrument with strips on instrument's back. Horsehair/nylon strings.
- Gumbri, Guinbri. Lute played by Gnawa people (descendants of West Africans brought north to Morocco as slaves).
- Gurumi. Dosso people of Niger. Mauri people, southern Chad.
- Gurumi. Hausa people. Niger. 2 strings, calabash soundbox.
- Gurumi. Toubou people. Nigeria. 2 strings, calabash soundbox.
- Kambre. Sierra Leone.
- Kubru. Timbuktu, Mali. 3 strings, plucked. Boat shaped soundbox, "metal-ringed jingle". Paired with diarka one-stringed fiddle.
- Ngùlǎn. Bana people. Cameroon. 3 strings, calabash or gourd soundbox in bowl shape.
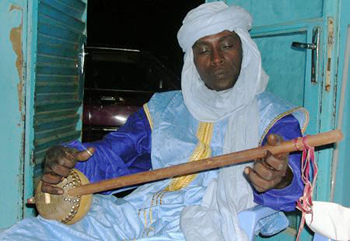
Malam Maman Barka of the Toubou people, playing an Ngurumi.

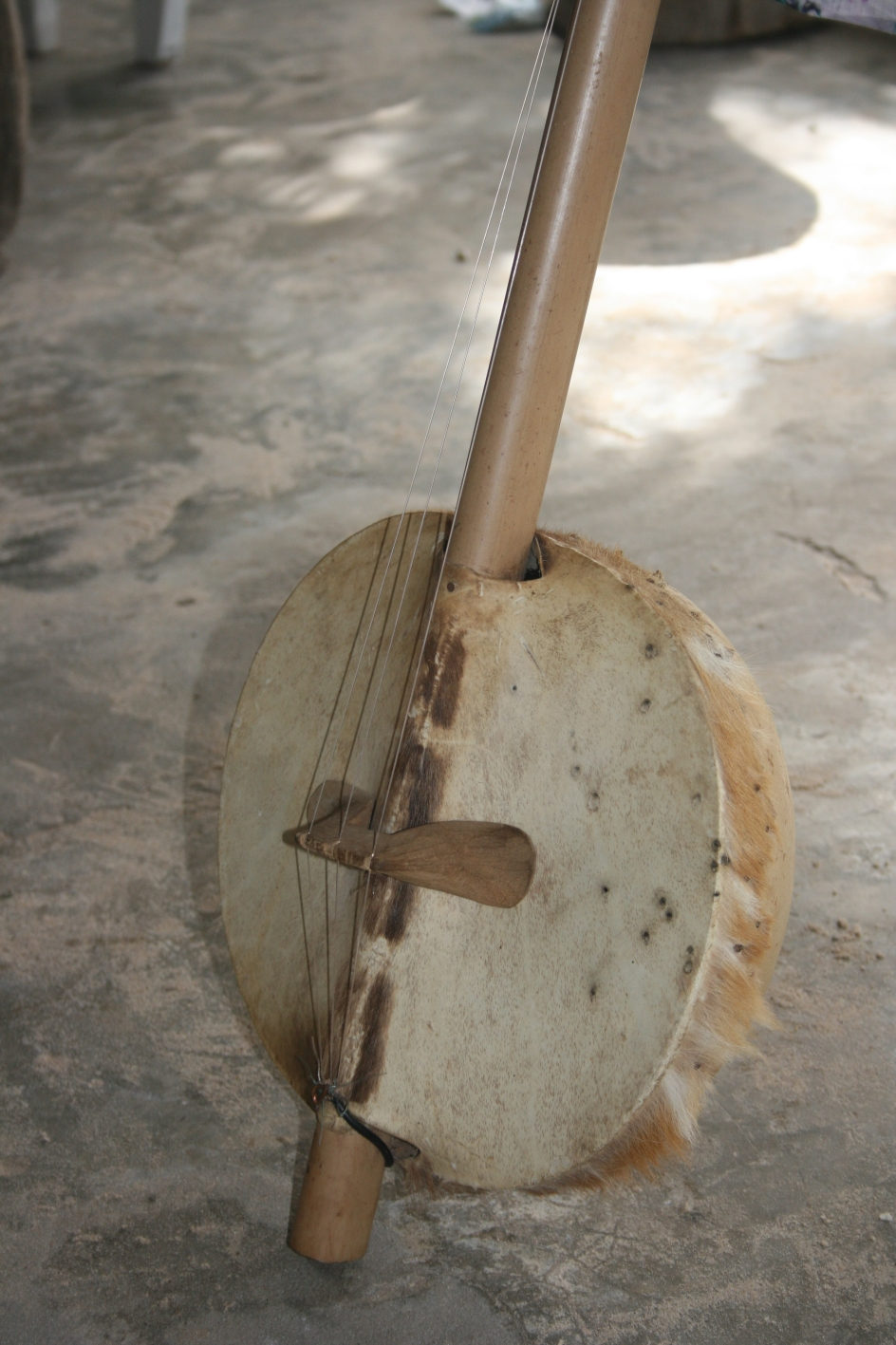
Econtine, Diola people, in Casamance, Senegal

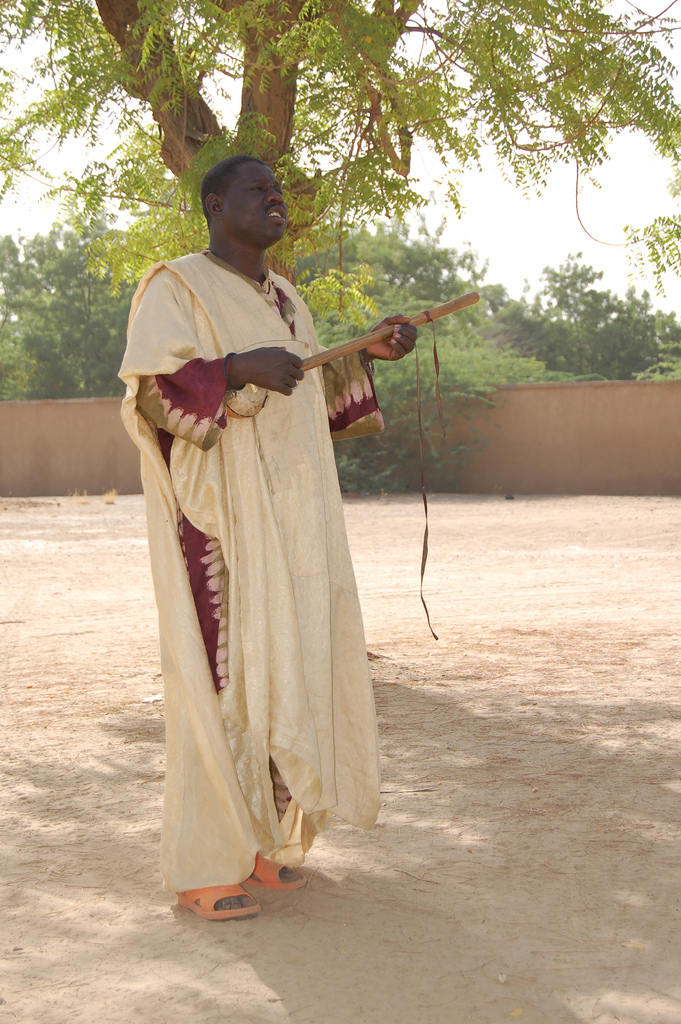
A Hausa Griot playing the gurmi (a Hausa variant of the xalam with a signature spherical body) in Diffa, Niger.
