= Akonting =

Folk lute of the Jola ethnic group

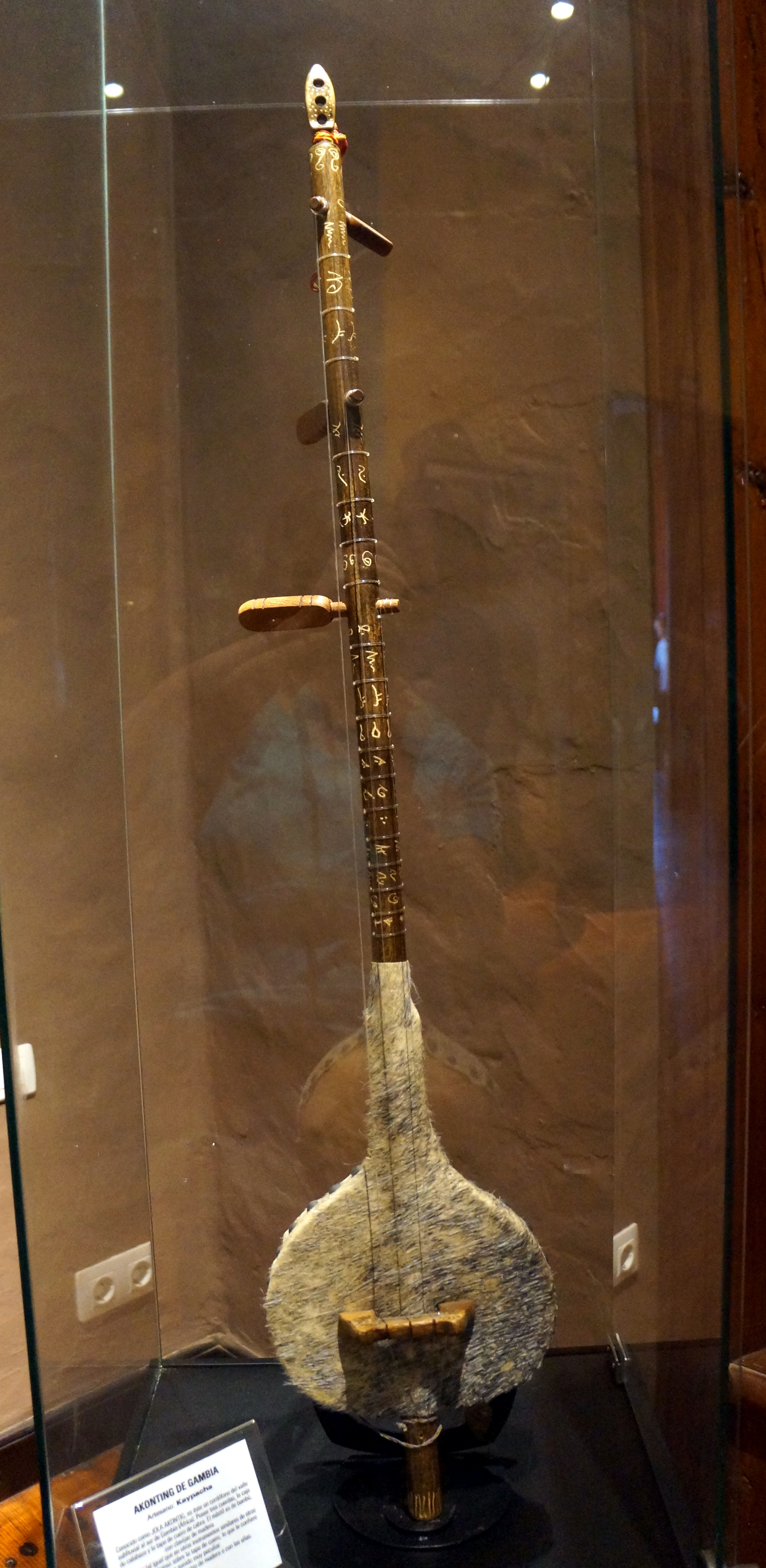
- West African Akonting at the Casa Museo del Timple, Lanzarote, Spain.

String instrument
- Hornbostel–Sachs classification: 321.311 (Spike bowl lute: Chordophone, the plane of strings runs parallel with the sound table, the string bearer is a plain handle and passes "diametrically" through the resonator, the resonator consists of a natural or carved out bowl)

Related instruments
- banjo; gumbri/sintir; ngoni; xalam

The akonting or ekonting in French transliteration) is the folk lute of the Jola people, found in Senegal, Gambia, and Guinea-Bissau in West Africa. It is a string instrument with a skin-headed gourd body, two long melody strings, and one short drone string, akin to the short fifth "thumb string" on the five-string banjo.

Jola oral tradition places the birthplace of the akonting in the village of Kanjanka in Lower Casamance (Senegal), near the banks of the Casamance River. The name of the instrument's home village is recalled in the most common tuning pattern for the akonting's three open strings (from the 3rd short "thumb" string to the 1st long melody string): kan (the 5th note of the scale, tuned an octave higher), jan (root note), ka (flatted 7th note).

Like in the traditional old-time/folk styles of playing the 5-string banjo, the akonting is tuned in different tunings. Using the kanjanka tuning pattern of 5/1/-7, a common tuning in Casamance is dGF. In Gambia, for another variant the 1st long melody is raised a semitone (half-step) higher to make a natural 7th note, as in cFE.

Gambian Jola scholar/musician Daniel Laemouahuma Jatta, who pioneered the research and documentation of the akonting in the mid-1980s, describes the music of his people's folk lute as follows:

The music of the akonting is short sustained notes that are played over and over again. Usually they are between two to three notes. The mechanics involved in playing the akonting is the regular sounding of the short string (drone string) when playing any melody. It acts as a drum to add beauty to the melody. The middle string is also sometimes used as drone string. All the noting is done on the long string. The music of the akonting has been and still is folk music. Akonting players do not play music to confer status to their patrons. They play their music, usually in the evenings after work to relax and have a nice time before going to bed. Also when in their rice field bars (Hu Waa in Jola) they play the Akonting in the evening after working in their rice fields and drink their palm wine that they are expert in tapping from the palm tree. The music of the Akonting deals with all matters of life and does not need to be augmented by any other instrument to be danceable. It is rhythmic enough to enable one to dance.

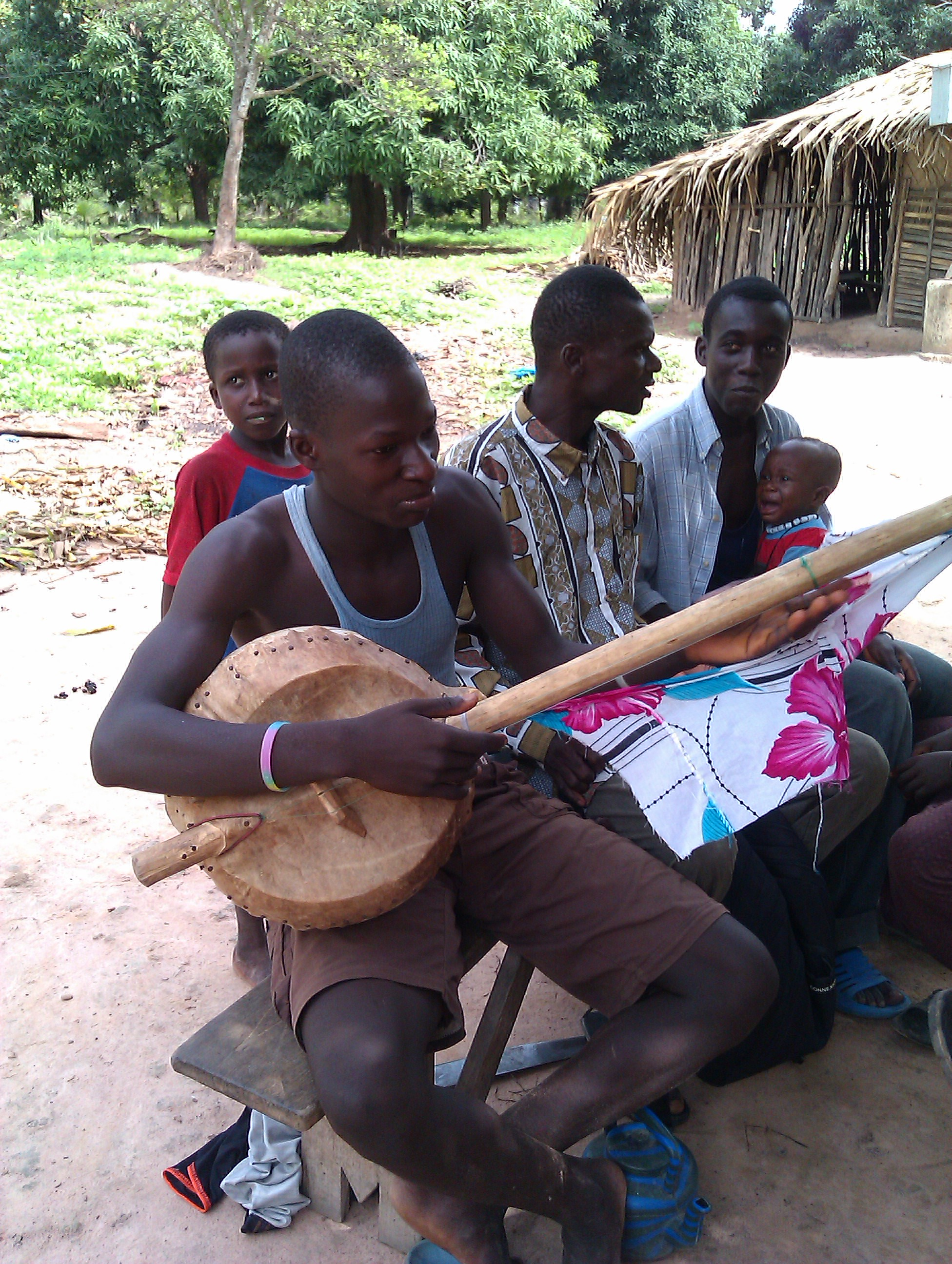
Akonting player in Bagaya

The akonting is practically identical to the buchundu of the related Manjago people (also Man'yago, Manjaku, Manjaco and Manjaca) of Gambia and Guinea-Bissau, as well as the busunde of the Papel people and the kisinta of the Balanta people, both of Guinea-Bissau.

Recent findings presented by researchers Daniel Laemouahuma Jatta, Ulf Jägfors, and Shlomo Pestcoe at The 8th Annual Banjo Collectors Gathering (December, 2005) – an annual international conference of the foremost collectors and scholars of 19th- and early 20th-century banjos, which also serves as the principal forum for presentations of new research on the banjo's history and organology – indicate that the banjo is probably descended from the many different types of gourd-bodied folk/artisan plucked lutes found throughout West Africa, like the akonting and its aforementioned Senegambian siblings. Other varieties include the Frafra koliko (Ghana), The Kotokoli (also Tem or Temba) lawa (Togo, Benin and Ghana), the Gwari kaburu (Nigeria), and the Hausa gurmi, komo, komsa and wase (Nigeria, Niger, Ghana), to name but a few. The earliest forms of the banjo were, in fact, very similar gourd-bodied lutes, which enslaved West Africans in the Caribbean began making and playing sometime in the early 17th century.

== Relationship to banjo ==
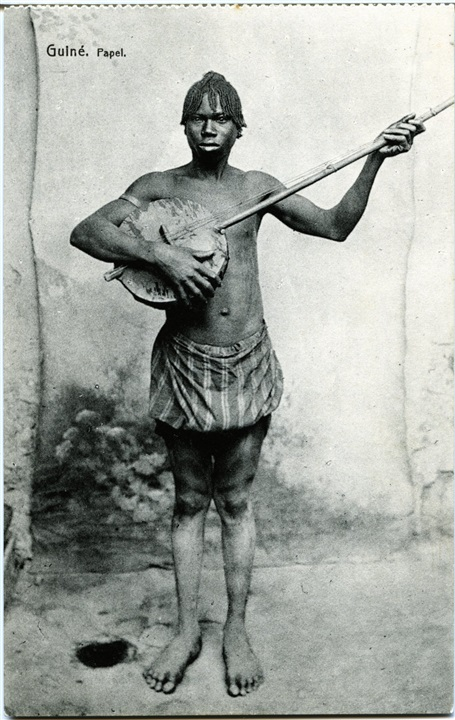
Guinea, Papel people. Probable busunde or ngopata lute, related to the akonting and banjo.

Of all the myriad variety of West African plucked lutes, the Jola akonting stands out as the one instrument today that bears the strongest resemblance to early North American gourd banjos. This is seen not just in its physiology but also in the traditional technique used to play the akonting, called o'teck (literally, "to stroke"), which is basically the same as the stroke, or frailing style, considered to be the oldest extant technique for playing the banjo.

Both the akonting o'teck and the banjo stroke style are forms of down-picking, a technique in which the fingernail of a single finger – either the index or middle finger – is used to strike the individual melody strings in a downward motion, like a plectrum. This action is immediately followed by the player's thumb catching on the top short "thumb string" to create a rhythmic back-beat accompaniment.

It was the stroke style of banjo that European American performers, who came to be known as blackface minstrels (see minstrel show), initially learned from African American musicians in the early 19th century. (The blackface minstrels popularized the banjo in the 1830s and 40s. Prior to that the banjo was a folk instrument exclusive to African American and African Caribbean musicians.) This was the prevalent form of playing the 5-string banjo until the advent of the guitar style of up-picking in the late 1860s, also referred to as finger-picking. The stroke style of down-picking has survived to this very day in the folk traditions of both the black and white communities of the rural South, where it is commonly referred to as frailing, clawhammer, thumping, among other terms.

Remarkably, the Jola o'teck technique of playing the akonting is the only extant down-picking style of lute playing found in all of West Africa thus far. Even more pertinent to the ongoing search for the banjo's ancestors, it is the only West African lute with a banjo-like short "thumb string" which is played in this manner.

In addition to the Jola akonting, the Manjago buchundu, the Papel busunde, the Balanta kisinta, and all the various kinds of wooden-bodied lutes that are exclusive to the griots (for example, the Mande ngoni, the Wolof xalam, the Fula hoddu, and the Soninke gambare) have a short "thumb string" drone. The "thumb string" seems to be a feature unique to lutes of Senegambian origin which have three or more strings and are played with the fingers, regardless of playing style. Conversely, 1-string lutes (e.g. the gourd-bodied gambra of the Haratin of Mauritania) and 2-string lutes (e.g. the gourd-bodied koliko of the Frafra of Ghana and the wooden-bodied garaya of the Hausa of Nigeria, Niger, and Ghana) are played with flat-pick type plectrums, so a drone string is useless on these instruments.

The standard griot playing technique is a 2-finger up-picking pattern: the player's index finger plucks up on a melody string, followed by the thumb plucking the short drone string, and culminating with the index finger brushing down all the strings. While the griot technique is strikingly similar to some styles of old-time 2-finger up-picking found in various regions of rural southern United States, it is distinctly different from down-picking and not related to the early "stroke style" of playing the 5-string banjo or its descendants, the various old-time Southern down-picking styles.

== The Akonting today ==
In the mid-1980s, when Gambian Jola scholar/musician Daniel Laemouahuma Jatta first began to research and document his people's folk lute, the akonting, the tradition of making and playing the instrument was relatively unknown outside of the rural Jola villages found throughout Senegambia. Even within these Jola communities, there were very few young people interested in carrying on the akonting tradition. Recognizing this fact, Daniel's father, a traditional akonting player originally from the instrument's birthplace, the Casamance region of Senegal, implored him to take up the akonting and help perpetuate this vital element of their people's cultural heritage.

Today, there is a burgeoning revival of interest in the akonting within its home region of Senegambia. Young akonting players like Bouba Diedhiou, a teenage radio performer from a rural Casamance village is carrying on the traditional style; also, Sana Ndiaye, best known for his work with the Dakar-based hip hop group Gokh-Bi System, is introducing the instrument to broader audiences.

Thanks to the work of Daniel Jatta, as well as the vital efforts of Swedish banjoist/researcher Ulf Jägfors, British banjo historian Nick Bamber, American old-time country musician/scholar Ben Nelson, banjoist/ gourd musical instrument expert/builder Paul Sedgwick, and others, there is growing global awareness of the akonting and its siblings in the large diverse family of West African folk/artisan lutes, which have been hitherto overlooked. These instruments are just now beginning to get the international recognition and attention they deserve as living ancestors of the banjo. Many museums around the world have updated their collections to include the akonting and other members of the West African folk/artisan lute family, while banjo historians and ethnomusicologists have begun to broaden the range of their focus to include these instruments.
