= Bakari Sumano =

Bakari Sumano (1935 – July 21, 2003) was head of Malian association of griots (wandering poet-musicians) from 1994 until his death.

== Biography ==
Bakari Sumano left school in 1955 to become a mechanic's apprentice, but continued to take night classes in history and typing. In 1957, he received a position at the Social Security Office. He went on a career at the National Institute of Social Providence, where he became the principal inspector and regional director of Kayes, Gao, Mopti, Koulikoro, and Bamako before his 1997 retirement.

Along with his administrative career, Sumano also assumed the functions of a griot. In 1994, he became head of the Association of Griots of Mali and dedicated himself to restoring the griots (who he preferred to call jeli) to a prominent role in Malian life.

He began courtesy visits to foreign heads of state visiting Mali and won recognition for the Association of Griots in the protocol list of the Republic in many official ceremonies. He also began accompanying the family of Niaré, founders of Bamako, to the mosque for the Tabaski prayer. Finally, he put in place official ceremonies for the naming of head griots in different cities, such as San and Naréna.

Increasingly famous, Sumano acted as a consultant for UNESCO and participated in many seminars and colloquia on Malian traditions in African, European, and US universities.

According to Sumano, "The griot has a knowledge of the sociology and anthropology of this country, the whole of oral tradition. He cultivates it by his performances every day, on all occasions. He tries to maintain living values, he has the function of an educator."
