= Babani Koné =

Malian composer and singer

- Also known as: Fatoumata Koné
- Born: 1968 (age 56–57); Ségou, Mali
- Occupation(s): Singer, composer

Fatoumata Koné (also Babani Koné, born in 1968 in Ségou, Mali), is a Malian composer and singer. She sings in the Bamana language.

== Early life ==
Babani Koné was raised by her grandmother, who was a griot, a storyteller/musician. Koné attended ceremonies at which her grandmother performed. She started singing while taking part in school or inter-neighborhood activities, and joined the Mali Pioneers movement.

== Career ==
In 1983, she took part in the Etoiles d'Afrique Festival in Abidjan and at the 1984 Biennale of Artistic and Cultural Arts in Mali. In 1989, she was invited with Toumani Diabaté to the Dranouter Folk Music Festival in Belgium. she recorded two successful albums: Sanou Djala and Barika.

In 1999, she finished the program of the Africolor Festival in France. In 2004, she won an award at the World Culture Open Festival in Seoul, South Korea. In 2006 she participated in a tour in Britain, with some artists, entitled The Dangerous / The Asian Music Circuit.

She was invited in 2007 to record an album of Mokobé, My Africa. In 2008, she was honored on stage at the SFINKS Festival in Antwerp. That year, Koné was awarded the Golden Tamani for best Malian artist, and won best female Malian artist. She continued to participate in international musical events, including the Night of the African Divas at the Zenith of Paris in May 2009, at the Festival Essaouira Gnaoua et Musiques du Monde at Essaouira in Morocco in June 2009, and the Mûsîqât Festival in October 2010 in Tunisia.

Babani Koné has for the past many years, since the decline of Kandia Kouyate been regarded as one of the main praise singers at the famous Sunday weddings in the capital, Bamako. She is a Malian superstar, although not so well known in the West.

== Discography ==
- 1996 : Sanou Djala
- 1998 : Barika
- 2007 : Gnoumandon
- 2009 : Djeliya
- 2017 : Sumu
- 2020 : Babani Koné
