= Djanka Tassey Condé =

Djanka Tassey Condé (d. 1997) was a jeli nagara, or "chief of the bards", from Guinea. He lived in Fadama, a small village near the river Niandan, in the Dosso Region. His father, Babu Condé (d. 1964), and his brother taught him the art of storytelling, and he inherited his father's position. His oral performance of Epic of Sundiata in 1994 was recorded on cassette by American scholar David C. Conrad, and forms the basis of a published version of the epic. Djanka (he self-identified using his mother's name) could not read or write, but traced his lineage as a storyteller back to the Mali Empire; the performance of the epic on which Conrad based his text took place over six sessions, each lasting five to six hours.
