= Percy G. Harris =

Percy Graham Harris
- Born: 1894; St. Bees, England
- Died: 1945 (aged 50–51); Bamenda, British Cameroons
- Citizenship: Great Britain
- Occupation(s): British administrative officer, rank of Resident. Served in Colonial Nigeria and British Cameroons
- Employer: Nigerian Administrative Service
- Known for: service in British colonies in Nigeria. Papers submitted to Royal Anthropological Institute.

Percy Graham Harris was a British administrator in Nigeria from 1919-1945 and a Fellow in the Royal Anthropological Institute (RAI). He published articles under the name P. G. Harris in the RAI's journal, including information on Nigerian peoples, languages (including sign language), naming practices, music and agriculture.

Harris served in World War I with the King's Liverpool Regiment. He also served in the Nigeria Regiment. After the war, he joined the British Administrative Service in 1919, serving until his death in 1945. He reached the rank of Resident in the service by 1934, and was promoted to the Staff grade in 1938. He became a Companion (C.M.G.) in the Most Distinguished Order of St Michael and St George in 1945.

His time in the Nigeria Regiment led him to studies in anthropology, and he graduated from the London University with a diploma in anthropology. He became a Fellow with the Royal Anthropological Institute in 1927 and contributed papers until his death.

== Published articles ==
- Notes on the Dakarkari Peoples of Sokoto Province, Nigeria (Jan. - Jun., 1938) The Journal of the Royal Anthropological Institute of Great Britain and Ireland. OCLC:10642994. JSTOR, https://doi.org/10.2307/2843984.
- A Note on Mungo Park and the Upper Niger. Journal of the Royal African Society, vol. 35, no. 141, 1936, pp. 435–39. OCLC, 9971082159. JSTOR, http://www.jstor.org/stable/717155
- The Kebbi Fishermen (Sokoto Province, Nigeria). The Journal of the Royal Anthropological Institute of Great Britain and Ireland, vol. 72, no. 1/2, 1942, pp. 23–31. OCLC, 5545526593. JSTOR, https://doi.org/10.2307/2844454
- Notes on Drums and Musical Instruments Seen in Sokoto Province, Nigeria. The Journal of the Royal Anthropological Institute of Great Britain and Ireland, vol. 62, 1932, pp. 105–25. OCLC, 5545609946. JSTOR, https://doi.org/10.2307/2843880
- Some Conventional Hausa Names. Man, vol. 31, 1931, pp. 272–74. JSTOR, https://doi.org/10.2307/2789071
- BEBANCHI—THE PANTOMIME LANGUAGE OF THE HAUSA DEAF AND DUMB. American Annals of the Deaf, vol. 78, no. 2, 1933, pp. 116–19. OCLC, 9977868659. JSTOR, http://www.jstor.org/stable/44391311
- Chess in Bornu: Nigeria. Man, vol. 39, 1939, pp. 31–32. OCLC, 9964355645. JSTOR, http://www.jstor.org/stable/2793143
- Notes on Yauri (Sokoto Province), Nigeria. The Journal of the Royal Anthropological Institute of Great Britain and Ireland, vol. 60, 1930, pp. 283–334. OCLC: 5545533415. JSTOR, https://doi.org/10.2307/2843780
- Agricultural and Pastoral Implements of the Peoples of Argungu Emirate. Man, vol. 31, 1931, pp. 43–48. OCLO, 7547588875. JSTOR, https://doi.org/10.2307/2789537
- Cowries (correspondence to the journal Man. Man volume 43 (Nov. - Dec., 1943), pp. 143-144 Published by: Royal Anthropological Institute of Great Britain and Ireland. OCLC, 9964206796. JSTORE, https://www.jstor.org/stable/2792264

== Gallery ==
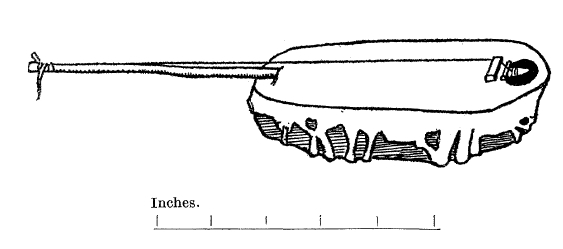
Kontigi

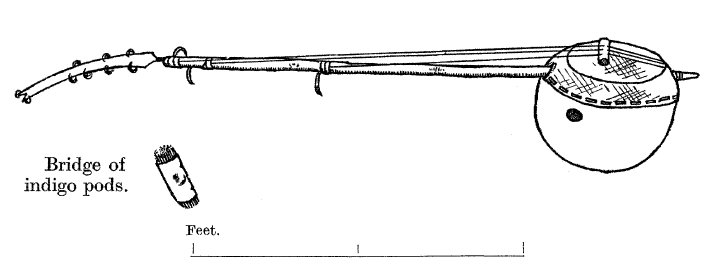
Gurmi

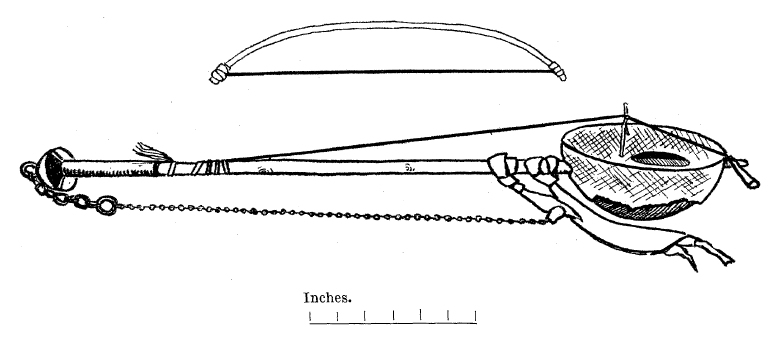
Goje

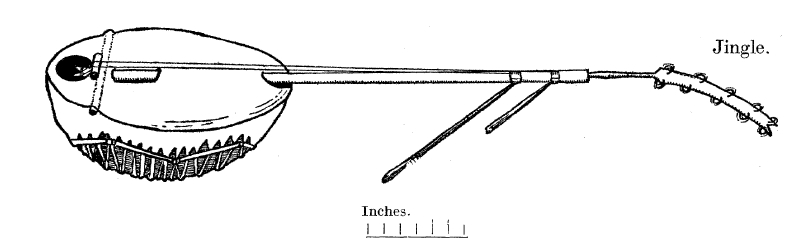
Kwamsa

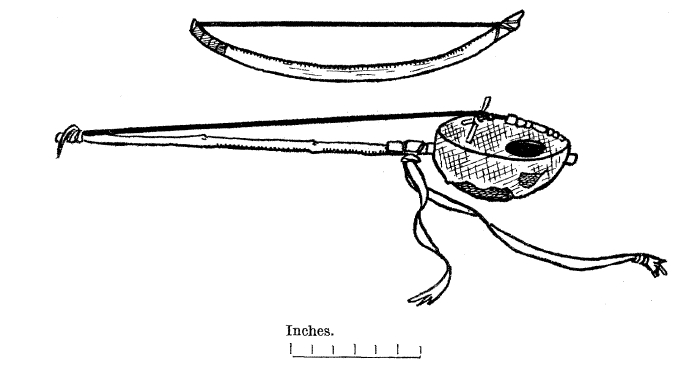
Kukkuma
