= Molo (lute) =

Type of lute

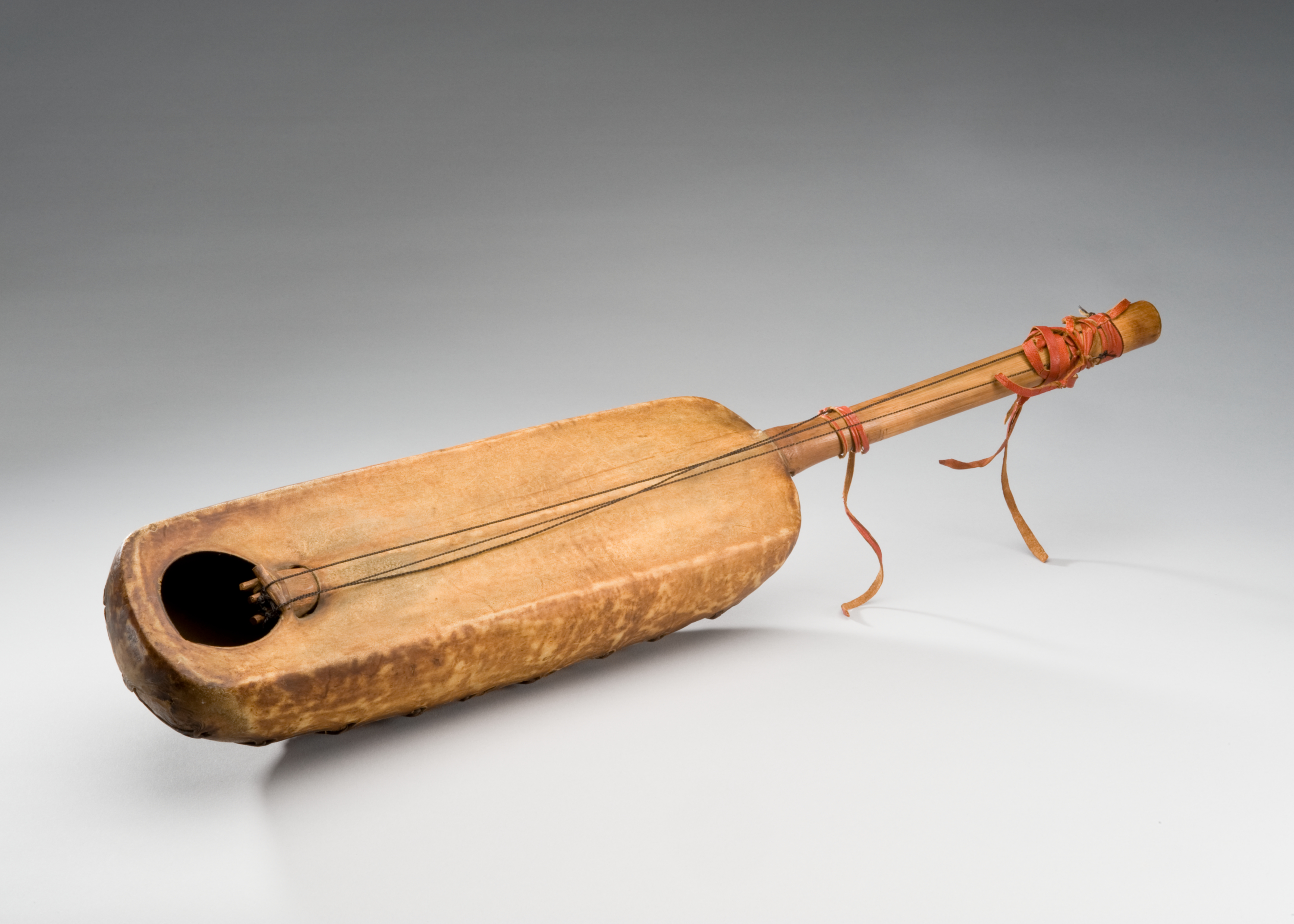
- A molo collected by Dr. Lorenzo Dow Turner, from the Hausa people of Nigeria in 1951.

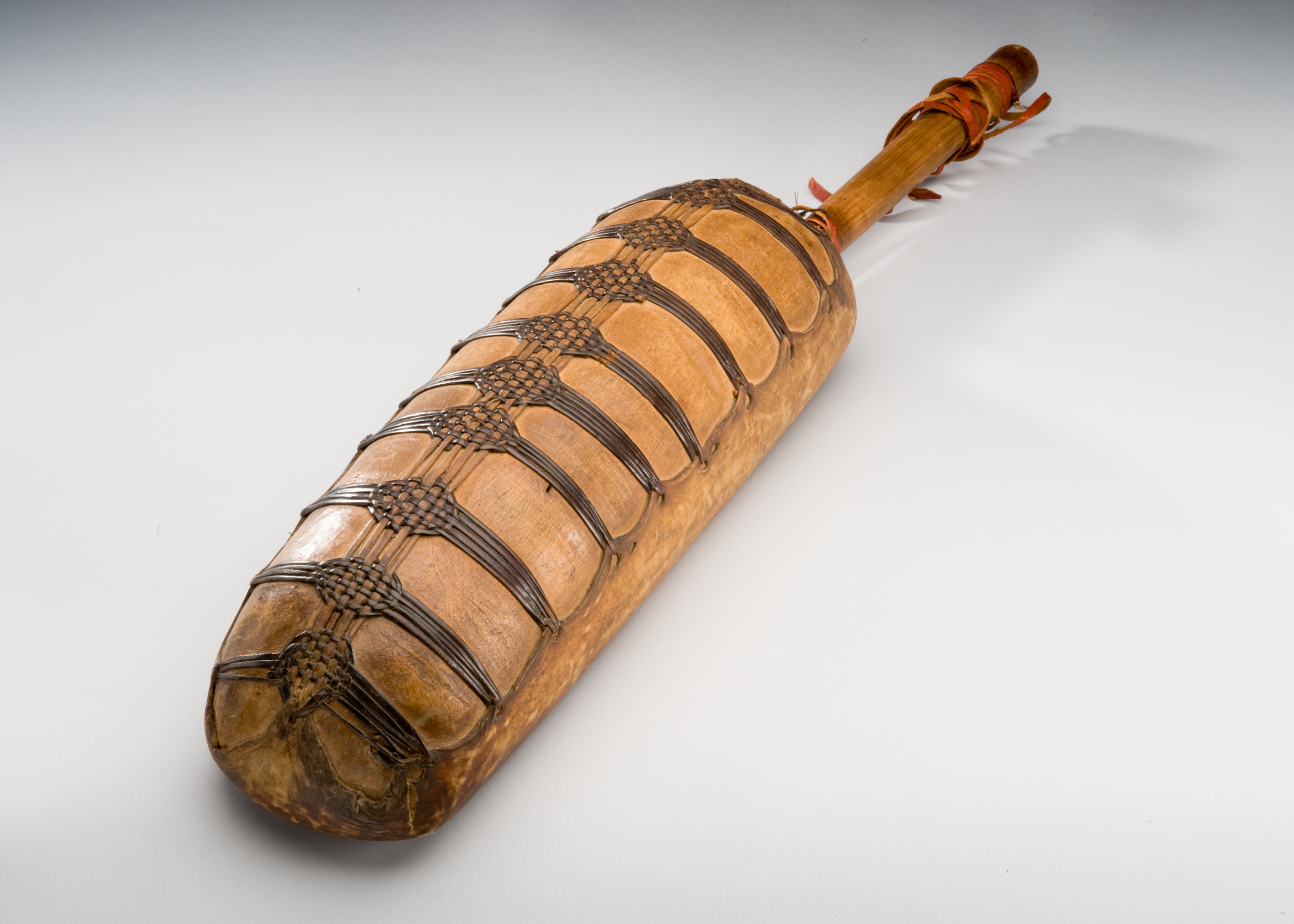
Backside of the molo collected by Dr. Lorenzo Dow Turner, from the Hausa people of Nigeria in 1951. The soundboard is held on and properly tensioned by the rawhide stings on the back of the instrument.

Molo is the name given to a lute by the Hausa people of Niger and northern Nigeria and the Songhay people of Niger. In Ghana, it is called Mɔɣlo in Dagbanli.

Molo is the name used for a specific type of African lute, one that has a boat-shaped body or soundbox, carved from wood, and a round dowel for a neck. The soundbox has an open top, covered by duiker hide or goatskin.

Molo has also become a generalized term for "any plucked string instrument" among the Hausa people in Nigeria. As the name of a specific type of lute among the Hausa, the instrument is one of at least seven different Hausa lutes, also including the round-bodied garaya (2-string, wood body), gurmi (3-string gourd bodied), gurumi (2-string calabash bodied), the komo (2-string gourd body), the kwamsa (or komsa, 2-string, gourd bodied), and the kontigi.

== Relationship to the banjo ==
The instrument found some fame when it was identified by Lorenzo Dow Turner as possibly being the instrument in The Old Plantation print, the earliest depiction of the banjo in the United States. However, the hypothesis has been disputed by researchers examining the details of both instruments. Where the molo has a boat-shaped body, a round neck that only goes through the body at one end, and 2-3 strings tied to slip rings around the instrument's neck, the African-American banjo in the painting has a round gourd body, a flat neck that goes through 2 sides of the body, and four strings attached to tuning pegs on the instrument's neck.

Victor Grauer, another who credited the instrument as a possible ancestor to the banjo, based his idea on the molo's short string, designed to play only one note, being similar to the banjo's 5th string, which plays only one note.

== Cultural uses ==
Both the garaya and the molo have been used for religious ceremonies, the "Bori spirit possession cult." All three are used today for entertainment and to accompany "praise singing."
