= Kukkuma =

Musical instrument

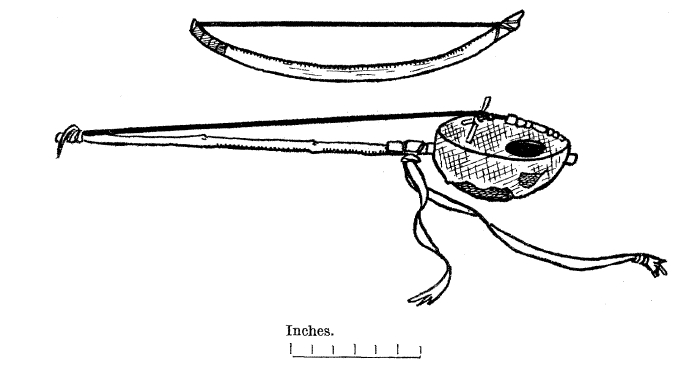
A kukkuma as illustrated by P. G. Harris in his 1932 article Notes on Drums and Musical Instruments Seen in Sokoto Province, Nigeria.

A kukkuma (Hausa: kukuma) is a small fiddle (about cm long) used in Hausa music. A spike fiddle or spike lute, the instrument is made from a calabash gourd covered with skin, with the neck (a stick) that impales the gourd, the bottom poking out one side to form a spike. It is strung with horsehair and played with a horsehair bow.

It was popularized by Ibrahim Na Habu. It is associated with light secular dance and praise music and in performance can be played alone, or is paired with the kalangu talking drum or calabash in a simple ensemble.

A larger fiddle, the goge, is used for rituals associated with cult and pre-Islamic Bori rituals, although it can also be played in secular music too.
