= Kontigi =

One-stringed African lute

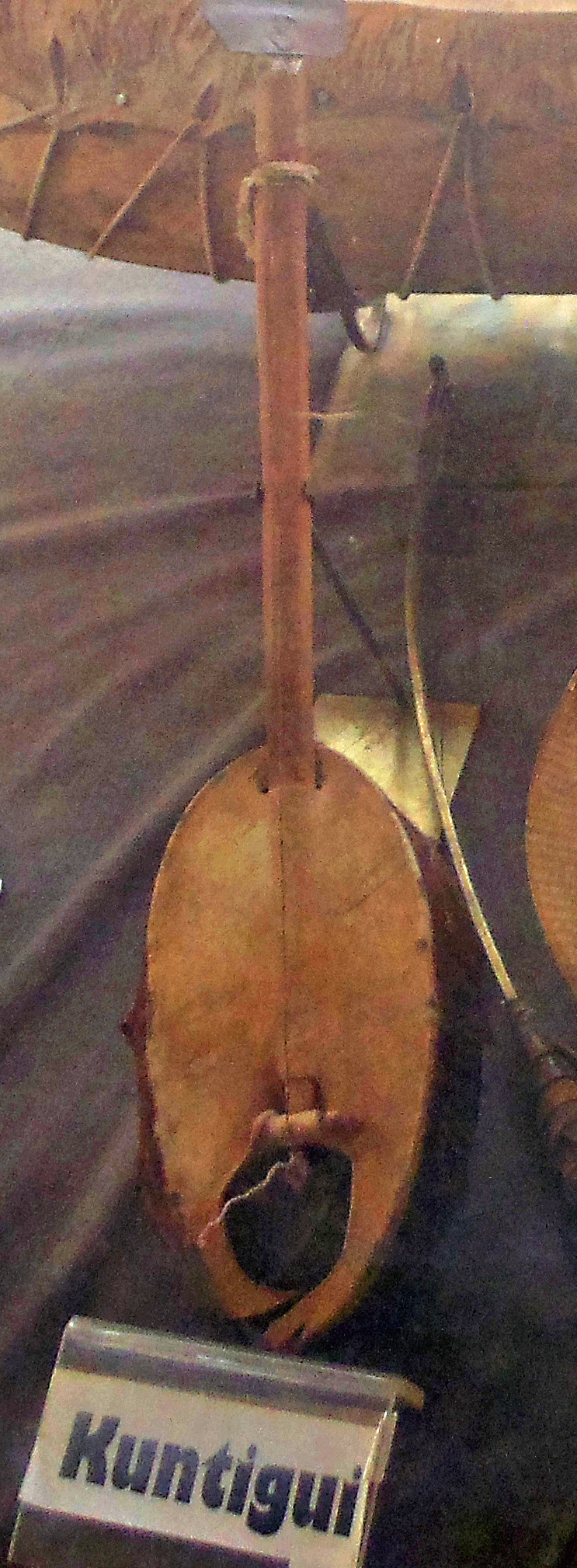
- Kontigi with metal body made from an oval can

String instrument
- Other names: Kuntigi

Musicians
- Dan Maraya, Griots

Builders
- the Hausa, Songhai and Djerma.

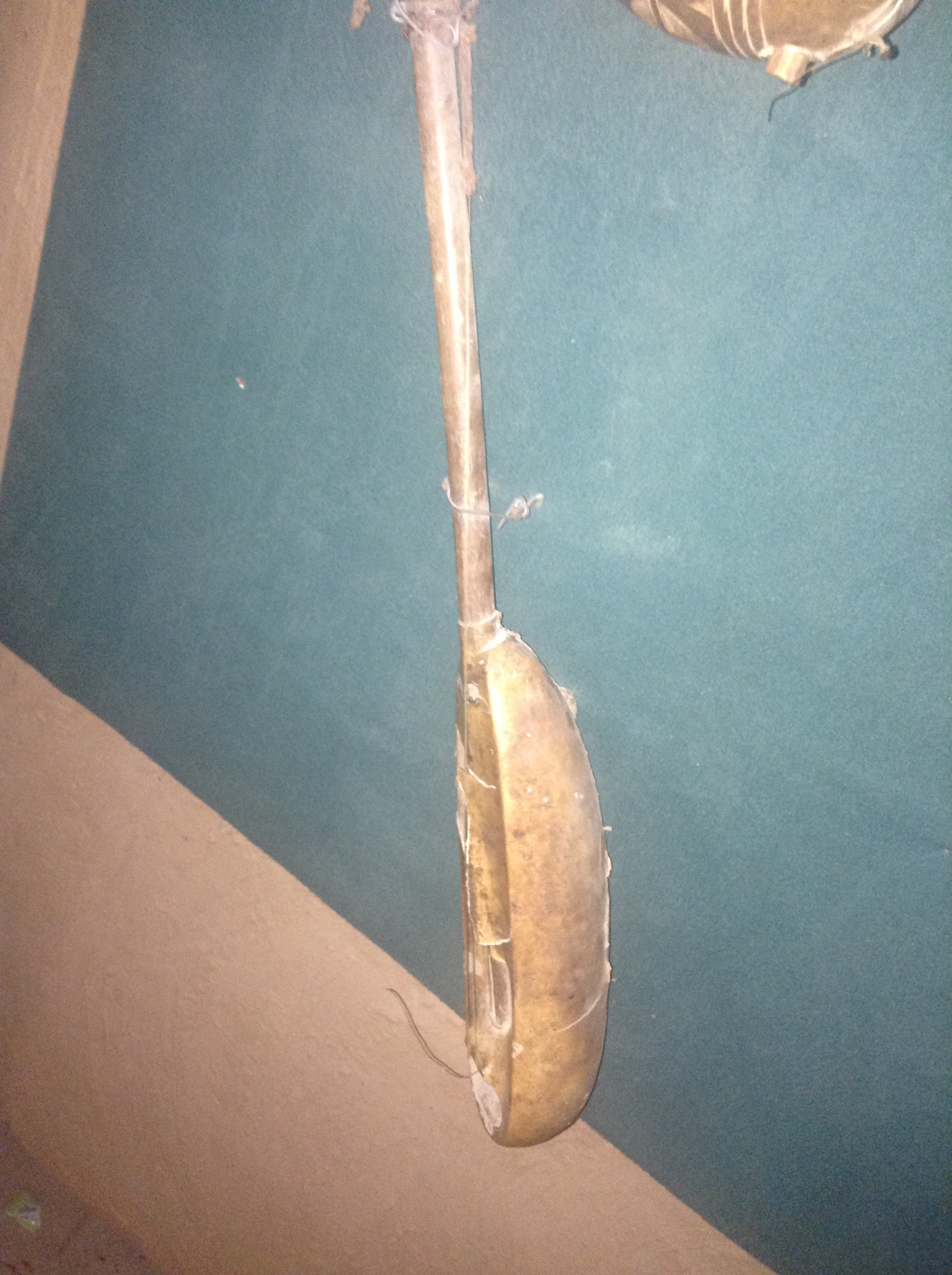
Side view of a kontigi. The lute has an elongated or oval half-calabash soundbox. It is small, about 12 inches long, with a high pitch.

A kontigi or kuntigi is a one-stringed African lute played by the Hausa, Songhai, and Djerma. A 3-string version teharden is used among the Tamashek.

The instrument is used in Hausa music, primarily in northern Nigeria and Niger, and among Hausa minorities in Benin, Ghana, Burkina Faso , and Cameroon. It is also found among Islamized peoples throughout West Africa (see Xalam). The best-known player of the Kontigi is Dan Maraya.

== Characteristics ==
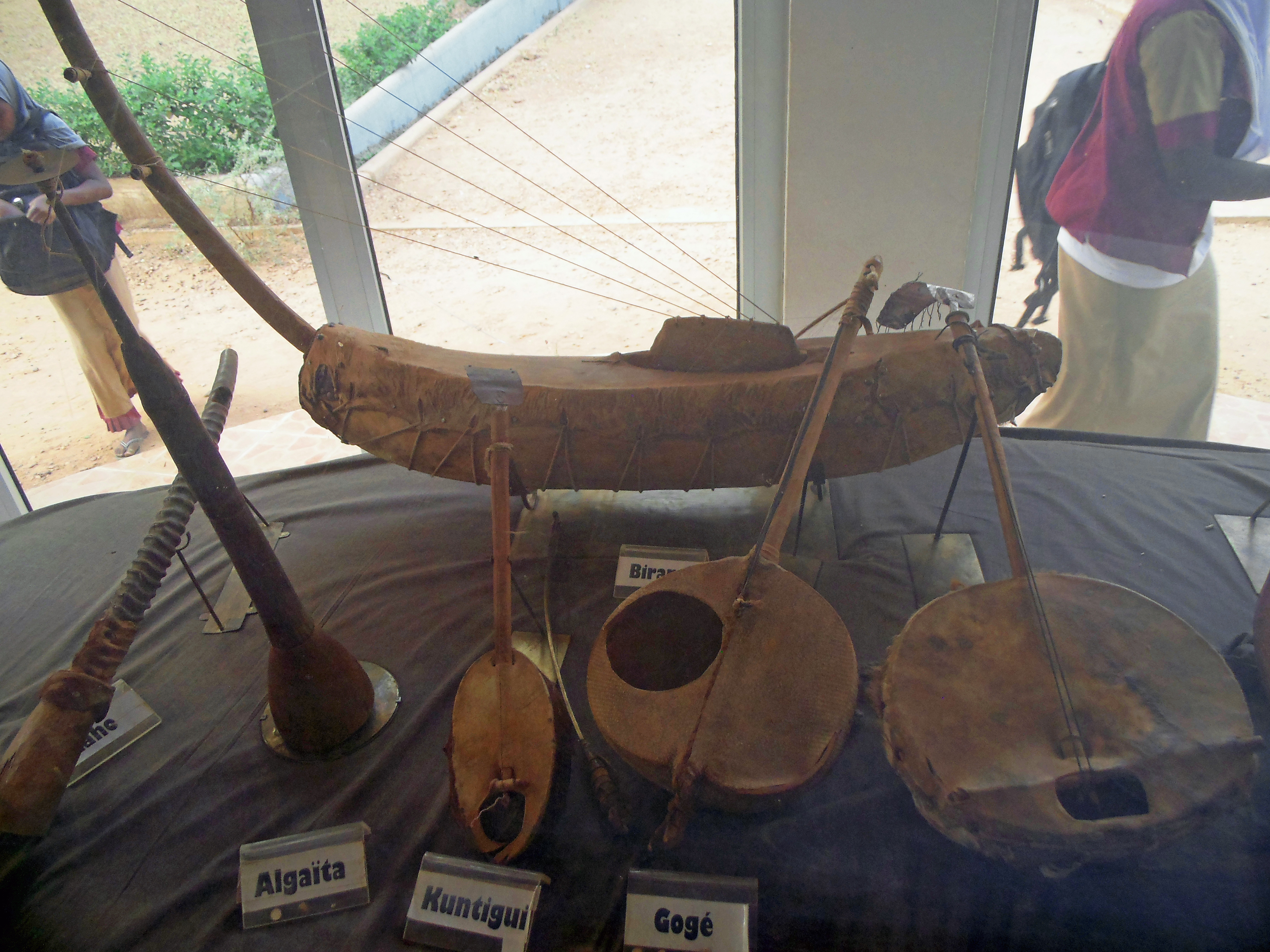
Kontigi, bottom row, third from left.

The instrument uses a calabash gourd as its body, covered with skin, with a stick for a neck. Modern instruments have had the gourd replaced by a can, such as a large sardine can. The neck on the Kontigi has "a metal disk surrounded by small rings," which makes noise as the instrument is moved or played. The tone is high-pitched.

== Performance ==
The instrument is used to perform "praise songs" by professional musicians or by Griots in Nigeria. A well-known musician who used the instrument was Dan Maraya, who recorded albums. The instrument is used in Niger by children and men who perform solo.

== Sample recordings ==
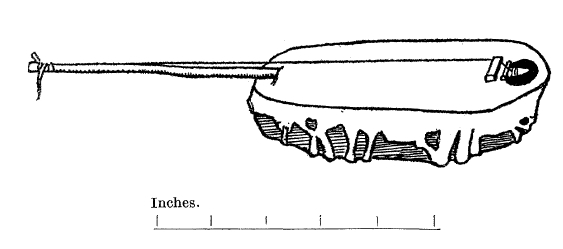
A kontigi as illustrated by P. G. Harris in his 1932 article Notes on Drums and Musical Instruments Seen in Sokoto Province, Nigeria

- Kidan Kashewa by Dan Maraya Jos
- Wakar Keren Mota III by Dan Maraya Jos

== See also ==
- Krar
