= Goje =

West African variety of one-stringed fiddles

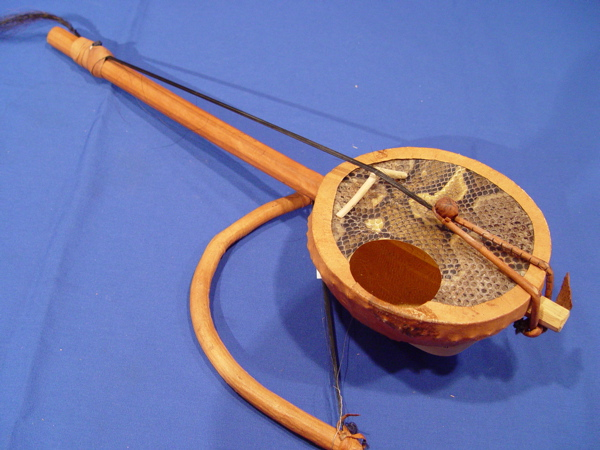
- Classification: Bowed string instrument

The goje (the Hausa name for the instrument) is one of the many names for a variety of one-stringed fiddles from West Africa, played by groups such as the Yoruba in Sakara music and West African groups that inhabit the Sahel. Snakeskin or lizard skin covers a gourd bowl, and a horsehair string is suspended on a bridge. The goje is played with a bowstring.

== Description ==
The goje is commonly used to accompany song, and is usually played as a solo instrument, although it also features prominently in ensembles with other West African string, wind, or percussion instruments, including the Shekere, calabash drum, talking drum, or Ney.

The instrument is tied to various pre-Islamic Sahelian rituals around jinn possession, such as the Bori and Hauka traditions of the Maguzawa Hausa, Zarma, Bororo Fulbe, and Songhay. These instruments are held in high esteem, and their use is linked to the spirit world, or as a carrier for voices aimed at or from the spirit world.

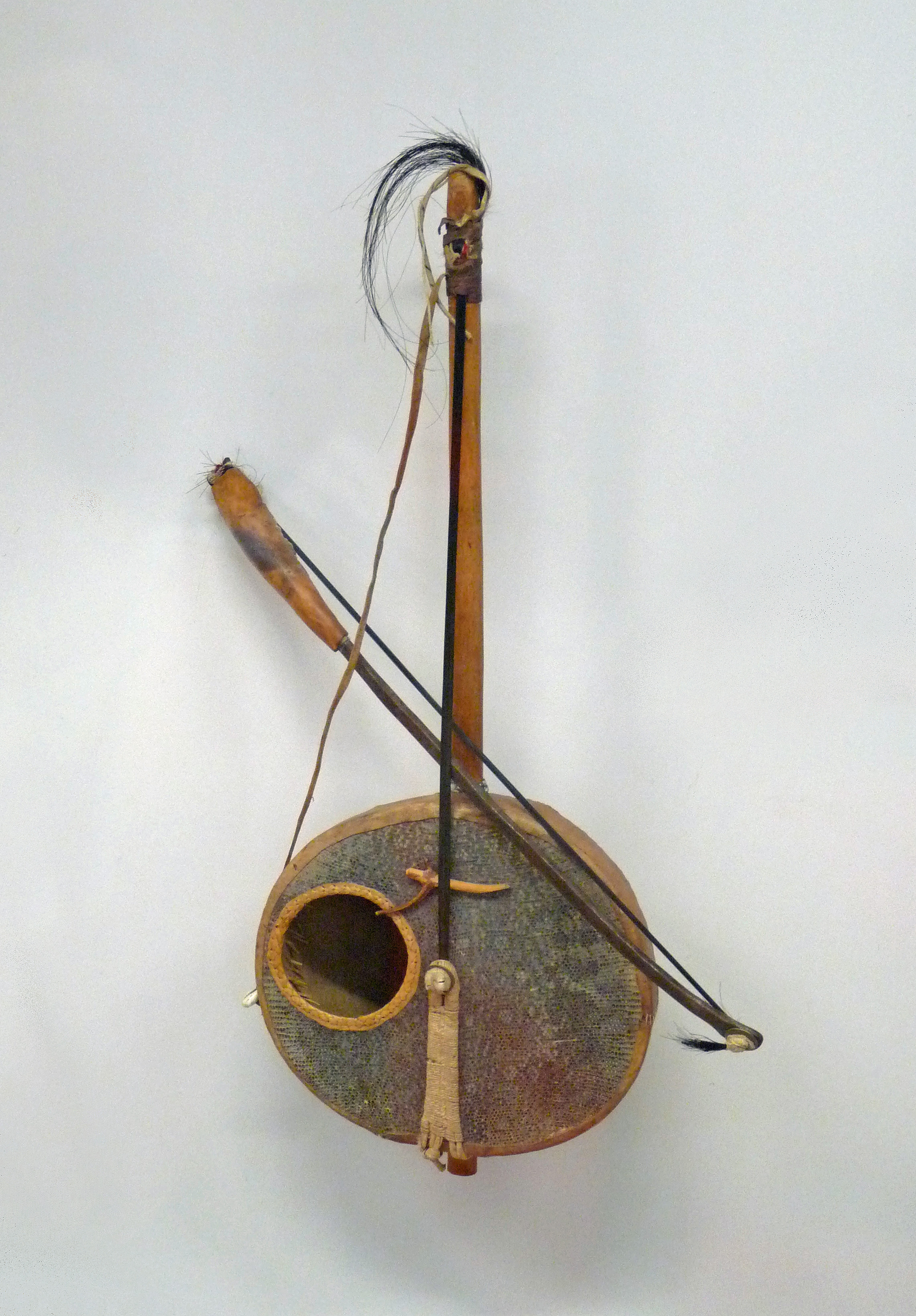
Goge in the Royal Museum for Central Africa.

The various names by which the goje is known include goge or goje (Hausa, Zarma), gonjey (Dagomba, Gurunsi), gonje, (Mamprusi, Dagomba), njarka/nzarka (Songhay), n'ko (Bambara, Mandinka and other Mande languages), riti (Fula, Serer), and nyanyeru or nyanyero.

Among the Hausa, another smaller fiddle called the kukkuma exists, whose use is associated with more secular acts, but it is played in a similar way to that of the slightly larger and esteemed goje.

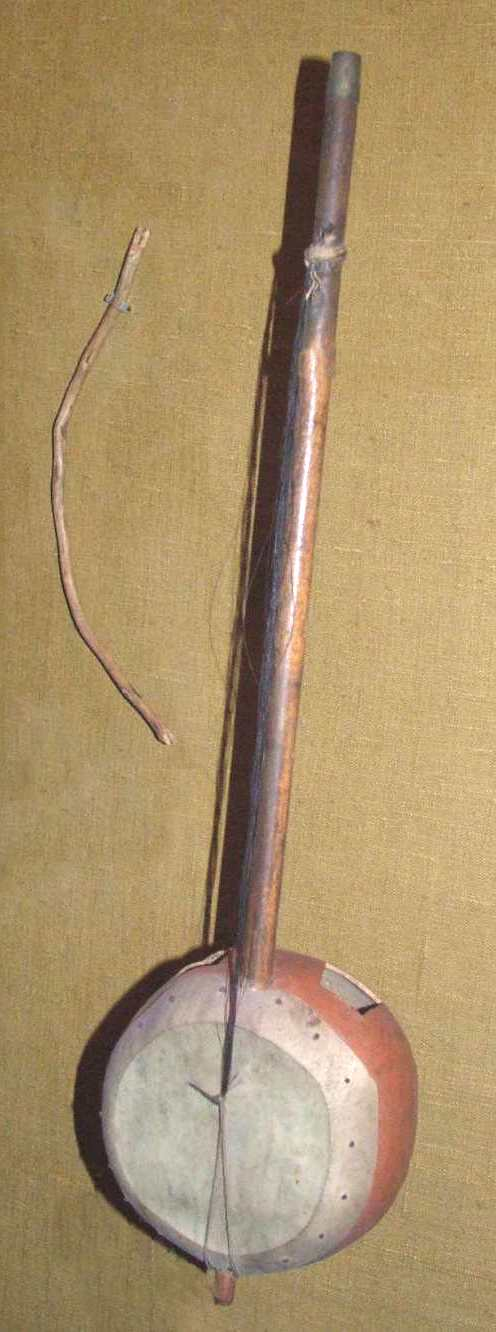
Nyanyeru, a Fulbe musical instrument, at the Metropolitan Museum of Art

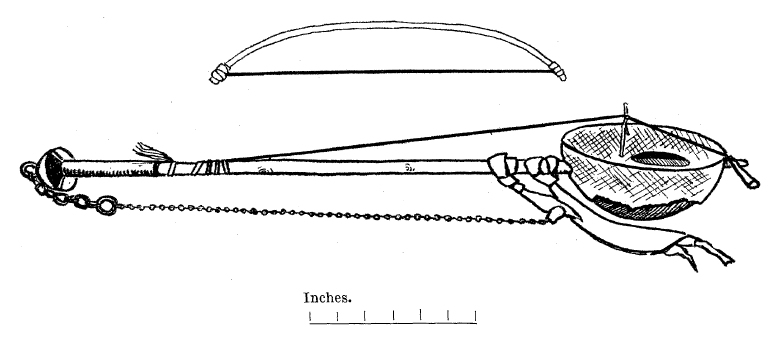
A goge as illustrated by P. G. Harris in his 1932 article Notes on Drums and Musical Instruments Seen in Sokoto Province, Nigeria

== See also ==
- Masenqo, a similar instrument used by the Habesha peoples
- Imzad, a similar instrument used by the Tuareg people
