= Griot =

Storyteller, singer, or musician of oral tradition in West Africa

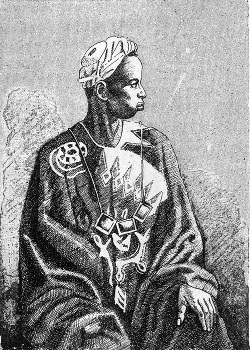
Senegalese griot, 1890

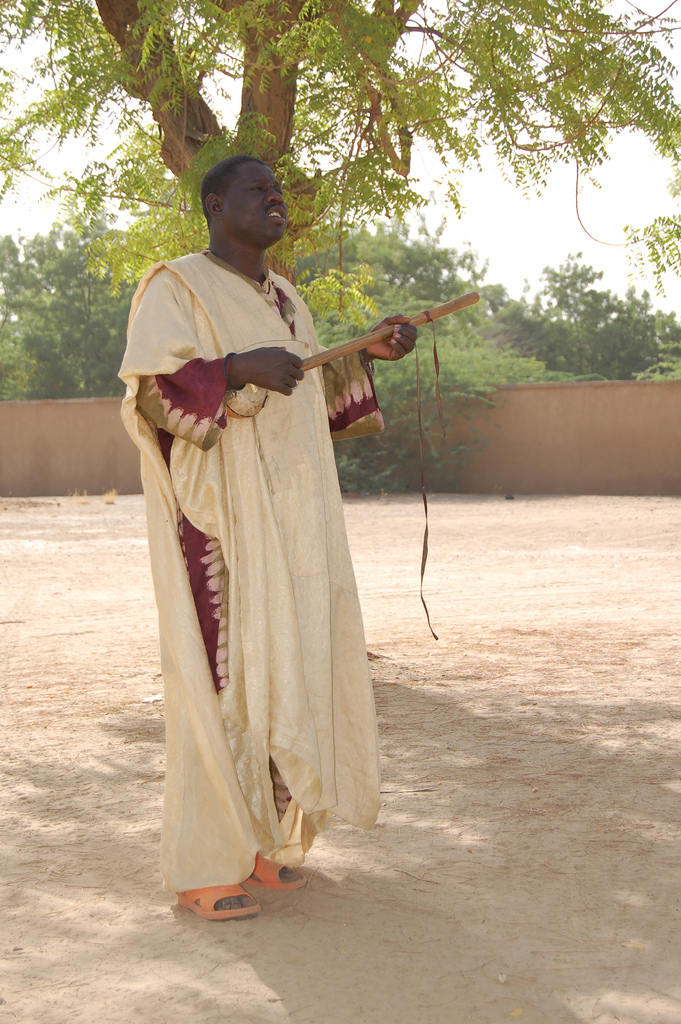
A Hausa griot performs at Diffa, Niger, playing a komsa (Xalam).

A griot (/ˈɡriːoʊ/; French: [ɡʁi.o]; Manding: jali or jeli (in N'Ko: ߖߋ߬ߟߌ, djeli or djéli in French spelling); also spelt Djali; Serer: paar or kevel or kewel / okawul; Wolof: gewel) is a West African historian, storyteller, praise singer, poet, and/or musician. Griots are masters of communicating stories and history orally, which is an African tradition.

Instead of writing history books, oral historians tell stories of the past that they have memorized. Sometimes there are families of historians, and the oral histories are passed down from one generation to the next. Telling a story out loud allows the speaker to use poetic and musical conventions that entertain an audience. This has contributed to many oral histories surviving for hundreds of years without being written down.

Through their storytelling, griots preserve and pass on the values of a tribe or people, such as the Senegalese. The Wolof people in Senegal depend on griots to learn about their culture.

The griot is a repository of oral tradition and is often seen as a leader due to their position as an advisor to members of the royal family. As a result of the former of these two functions, they are sometimes called bards. They also act as mediators in disputes.

== Etymology and terminology ==
The word may derive from the French transliteration guiriot of the Portuguese word criado, which is the masculine singular term for 'servant'. Griots are more predominant in the northern portions of West Africa.

Despite the important role of the griot in African culture, it is difficult to pin down the word's origin; hence the variety of terms for griot in various African languages. Griots are referred to by a number of names: ߖߋ߬ߟߌ jèli in northern Mande areas, jali in southern Mande areas, guewel in Wolof, paar or kevel or kewel or okawul in Serer, gawlo 𞤺𞤢𞤱𞤤𞤮 in Pulaar (Fula), iggawen in Hassaniyan, arokin in Yoruba, and diari or gesere in Soninke. Some of these may derive from Arabic قَول qawl, 'a saying, statement'.

The Manding term ߖߋߟߌߦߊ jeliya (meaning 'musicianhood') sometimes refers to the knowledge of griots, indicating the hereditary nature of the class. Jali comes from the root word ߖߊߟߌ jali or djali ('blood'). This is also the title given to griots in regions within the former Mali Empire. Though the term griot is more common in English, some, such as poet Bakari Sumano, prefer the term jeli.

Today, the term and spelling djali is often preferred, as noted by American poet Amiri Baraka and Congolese filmmaker Balufu Bakupa-Kanyinda.

== Role ==
Historically, Griots form an endogamous professionally specialised group or caste, meaning that most of them only marry fellow griots, and pass on the storytelling tradition down the family line. In the past, a family of griots would accompany a family of kings or emperors, who were superior in status to the griots. All kings had griots, and all griots had kings, and most villages also had their own griot. A village griot would relate stories of topics including births, deaths, marriages, battles, hunts, affairs, and other life events.

Griots have the main responsibility for keeping stories of the individual tribes and families alive in the oral tradition, with the narrative accompanied by a musical instrument. They are an essential part of many West African events such as weddings, where they sing and share family history of the bride and groom. It is also their role to settle disputes and act as mediator in case of conflicts. Respect for and familiarity with the griot meant that they could approach both parties without being attacked, and initiate peace negotiations between the hostile parties.

Francis Bebey writes about the griot in African Music, A People's Art:

The West African griot is a troubadour, the counterpart of the medieval European minstrel... The griot knows everything that is going on... He is a living archive of the people's traditions... The virtuoso talents of the griots command universal admiration. This virtuosity is the culmination of long years of study and hard work under the tuition of a teacher who is often a father or uncle. The profession is by no means a male prerogative. There are many women griots whose talents as singers and musicians are equally remarkable.

With this privilege of being a neutral mediator, griots had the freedom and expectation to criticize and keep in line those with a higher social status. Their professional authority allowed them to speak honestly in public, often addressing nobles, political leaders, and wealthy families. In a way, they were able to be a voice for the marginalized, and since their role in tradition was highly respected, their critiques were not overlooked. In earlier periods, the verbal power of "nyamakala" (artisan specialists, including griots) was believed to be strong enough to elevate a patron beyond his rank or undermine a noble's position in society.

Griots have learned how to use this form of communication as a sort of social influence. They are recognized for their strategic use of language in social and political contexts. Plus, skilled griots structure their speech so that multiple meanings can be interpreted from the same message. This practice is referred to as heteroglossia, and it's a sort of controlled ambiguity that allows them to enhance their influence. The ability to navigate competing perspectives through speech is considered a mark of mastery for both male and female griots.

== Women griotes (Griottes) ==
Women griots, who are often referred to as griottes (Jelimusow in Mande languages), play a central role in Mande and other West African oral traditions. Similar to the men, they are typically born into hereditary griot families and trained from a young age. However, there has been a lack of research on Griottes as African Studies tended to be marked by the male point of view.

The research that exists explains how, although epic narration has often been described as a male domain, knowledge of epic traditions is not strictly limited by gender. In many performances, men usually narrate the historical framework of epics while women sing the praise songs and embody the visual aspect. Griottes are involved in community ceremonies that range from weddings, naming rituals, and public commemorations. During weddings, it is tradition that griottes dress the bride, accompany her during rituals, and sing praise songs that publicly affirm the social connection between the families. The wedding songs griottes sing often include moral guidance and social instruction as they advise brides what is expected of them in marriage. Therefore, griottes often reaffirm existing social expectations, leading to their traditions getting passed down each generation.

Despite their limitations beyond singing and performance, some griottes have achieved recognition as masters of verbal art. The title "ngara" (or naaraa) signifies high achievement in historical knowledge and verbal performance. While this is a term usually given to men, women have also received it as recognition that depends on skill rather than gender.

Women griots (Jelimusow) demonstrate their authority through embodied performance. Women in these African societies usually appear to be reserved or soft spoken; however, during performances, they embody a character. Their soft voices turn into loud vocal projections and expressive gestures, creating this commanding physical appearance. This transformation reflects an embodiment of caste identity and the controlled expression of "Ama," which is a form of ritual power associated with griot status. Their clothes also symbolize this transformation as griot women wear bright colors and lots of jewelry to distinguish themselves from noble women and publicly show their caste difference.

In contemporary times, regional differences in griottes are evident. In Mali, female performers have increasingly assumed prominent public roles and often dominate commercial and international stages. However, in parts of Senegambia, men have maintained their dominance in mixed gender performances as women are often in complementary roles. Within performance partnerships, the distribution of financial rewards has sometimes reflected broader gender hierarchies.These patterns reflect broader regional social norms regarding gender and authority.

== Apprenticeship and training systems ==
Griot traditions are passed on from generation to generation through a hereditary apprenticeship systems in which knowledge is passed on in families. Children born into jeli families are raised from an early age in verbal art, music, and genalogy. Musicianship in griot families is considered to be inherited and not learned, thus emphasizing the hereditary aspect of the griot role.

They learn through observation, repetition, and guided participation in performances instead of through a classroom approach. Musical training in Mande culture is different from that in Western conservatories as students practice short repeated passages of actual pieces of music instead of exercises or technical drills. These segments then serve as examples of larger compositions and are repeated and expanded to build technical complexity and variation. Oral transmission is not only memorization but also on interpretation and adaptation as well. Griots learn basic stories and musical structures while at the same time learning how to adapt performances to specific audiences and social contexts.

Instrumental specialization may be also hereditary and gender based within jeli families. Males are often associated with instruments such as the kora, balafon, or ngoni, while females are often restricted to vocal performance and praise singing. Access to specialized knowledge may also be shaped by patronage, such as the perception of some forms of oral history being restricted or sacred.

== In the Mali Empire ==
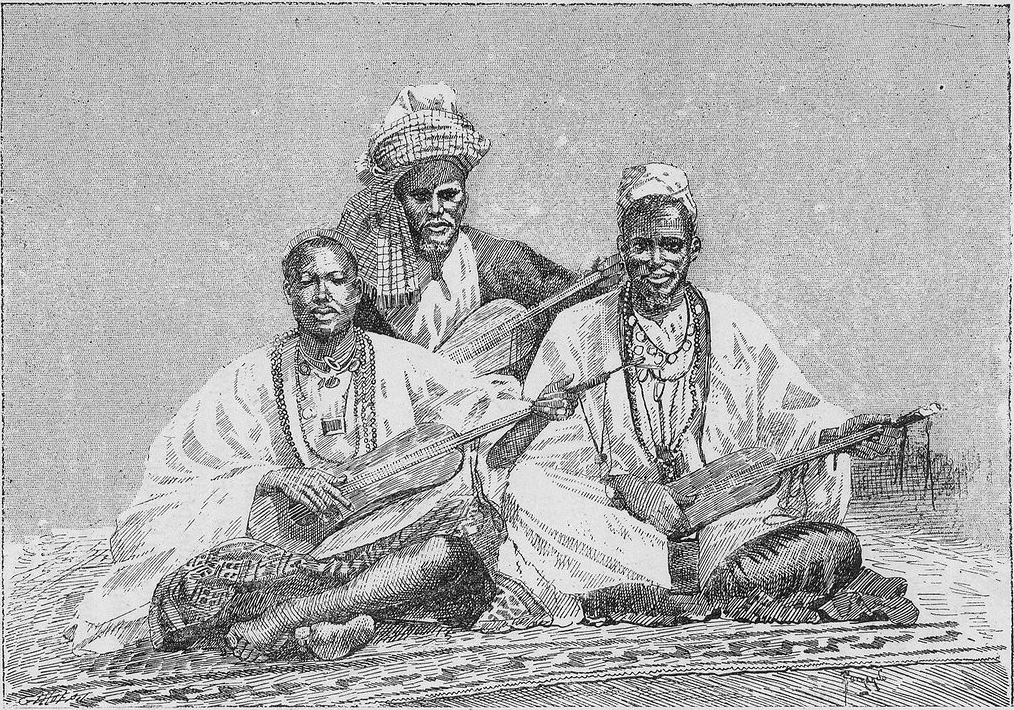
Griots of Sambala, king of Médina (Fula people, Mali), 1890. Photo by Joannès Barbier.

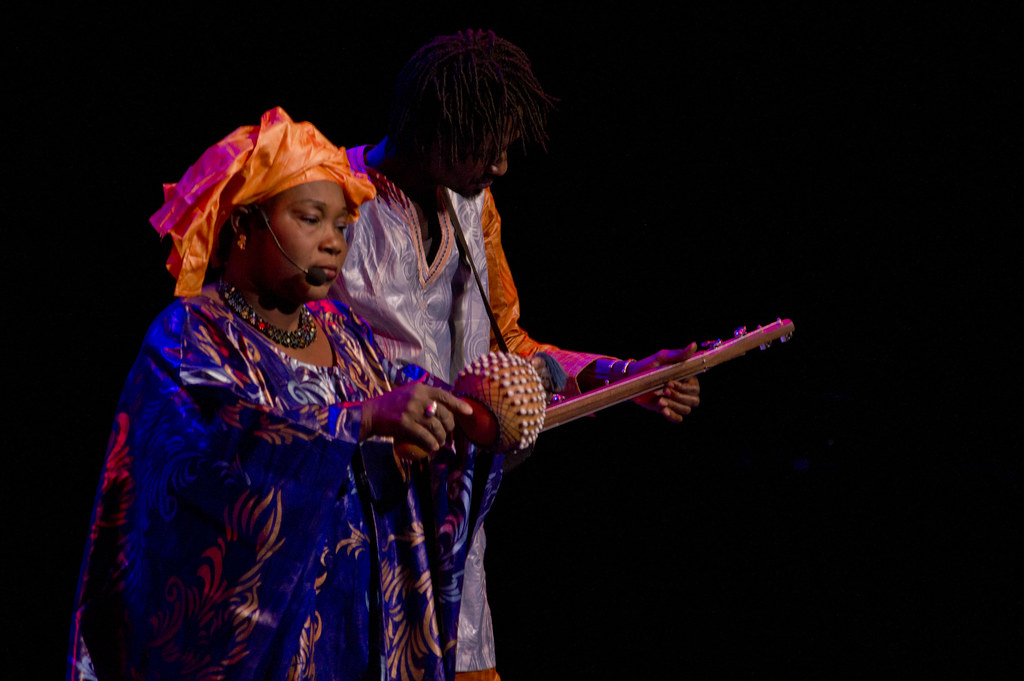
Trio Da Kali performing in Mexico City during the 32nd "Festival del Centro Histórico" in Teatro de la Ciudad, c. March 2016

The Mali Empire (Malinke Empire), at its height in the middle of the 14th century, extended from central Africa (today's Chad and Niger) to West Africa (today's Mali, Burkina Faso and Senegal). The empire was founded by Sundiata Keita, whose exploits remain celebrated in Mali today. In the Epic of Sundiata, Naré Maghann Konaté offered his son Sundiata Keita a griot, Balla Fasséké, to advise him in his reign. Balla Fasséké is considered the founder of the Kouyaté line of griots that exists to this day.

Each aristocratic family of griots accompanied a higher-ranked family of warrior-kings or emperors, called jatigi. In traditional culture, no griot can be without a jatigi, and no jatigi can be without a griot. However, the jatigi can loan his griot to another jatigi.

== In Mande society ==
In many Mande societies, the jeli was a historian, advisor, arbitrator, praise singer (patronage), and storyteller. They essentially served as history books, preserving ancient stories and traditions through song. Their tradition was passed down through generations. The name jeli means "blood" in Maninka language. They were believed to have deep connections to spiritual, social, or political powers. Speech was believed to have power in its capacity to recreate history and relationships.

Despite the authority of griots and the perceived power of their songs, griots are not treated as positively in West Africa as may be assumed. Thomas A. Hale wrote, "Another [reason for ambivalence towards griots] is an ancient tradition that marks them as a separate people categorized all too simplistically as members of a 'caste', a term that has come under increasing attack as a distortion of the social structure in the region. In the worst case, that difference meant burial for griots in trees rather than in the ground in order to avoid polluting the earth. Although these traditions are changing, griots and people of griot heritage have historically faced social pressure to marry within their hereditary lineages to sustain this practice. Therefore, such strict social norms reinforce occupational identity and social hierarchy. While modernization has reduced some of these constraints, stigma and marriage boundaries persist in certain communities.

One particular story that griots have enjoyed telling for generations is the Epic of Sundiata, which refers to the story of Sundiata Keita, the founder of the Mali Empire. In Mande culture, the king Sundiata eventually vanquishes named Sumanguru Kanté steals a magical balafon from forest genies that he uses to rule over his kingdom. Another character in the Epic of Sundiata is Kamissa, a sorceress from the land of Dô who possessed the ability to transform into a buffalo.

== Musical instruments used by griots ==
In addition to being singers and social commentators, griots are often skilled instrumentalists. Their instruments include stringed instruments like the kora, the khalam (or xalam), the ngoni, the kontigi, and the goje (or n'ko in the Mandinka language). Other instruments include the balafon, and the junjung.

According to the Encyclopædia Britannica: "West African plucked lutes such as the konting, khalam, and the nkoni (which was noted by Ibn Baṭṭūṭah in 1353) may have originated in ancient Egypt. The khalam is claimed to be the ancestor of the banjo. Another long-necked lute is the ramkie of South Africa."

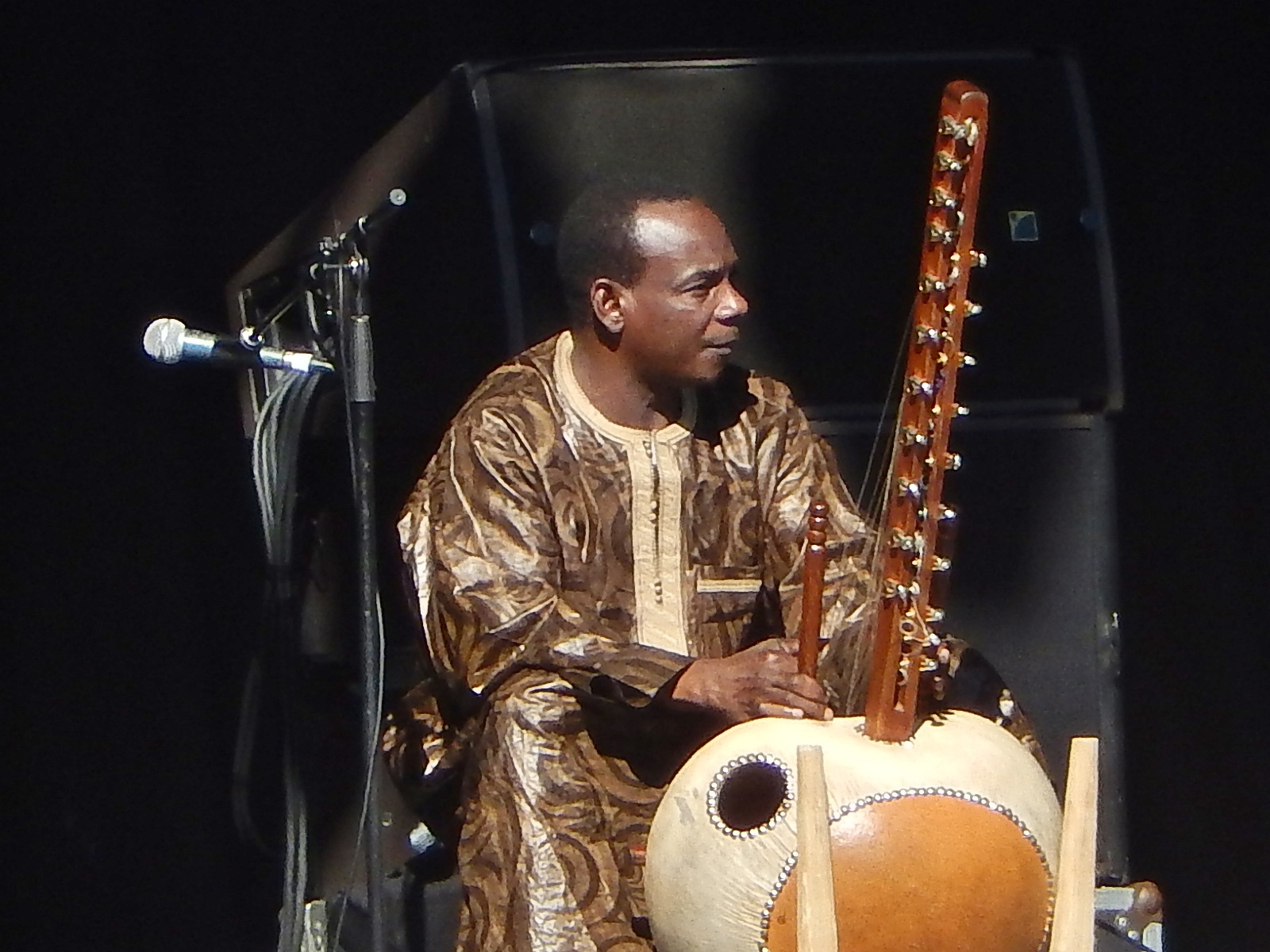
Toumani Diabaté, "Prince of the Kora"

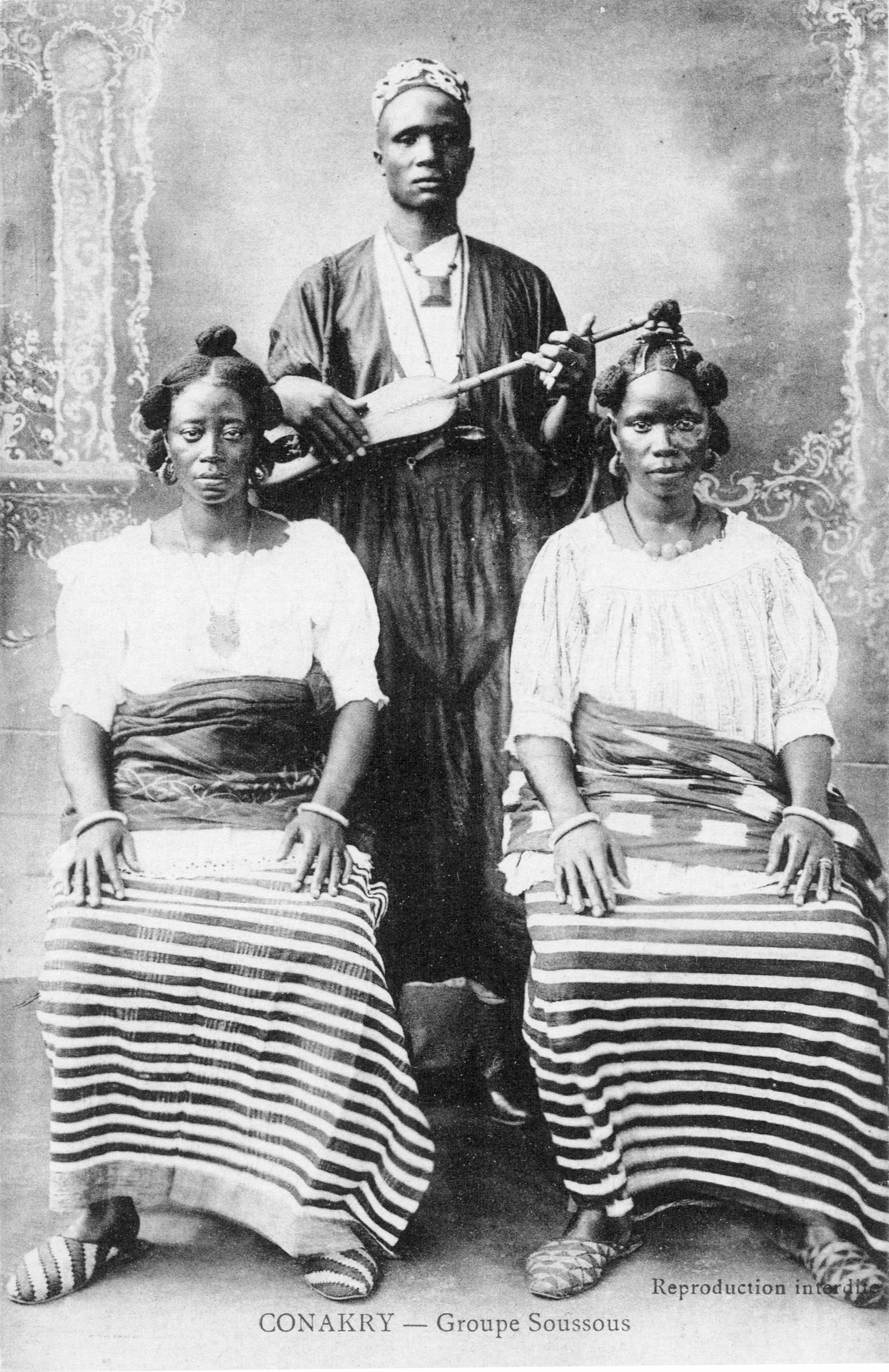
Guinea, circa 1910. A Susu griot poses with his koni (lute) behind two women.

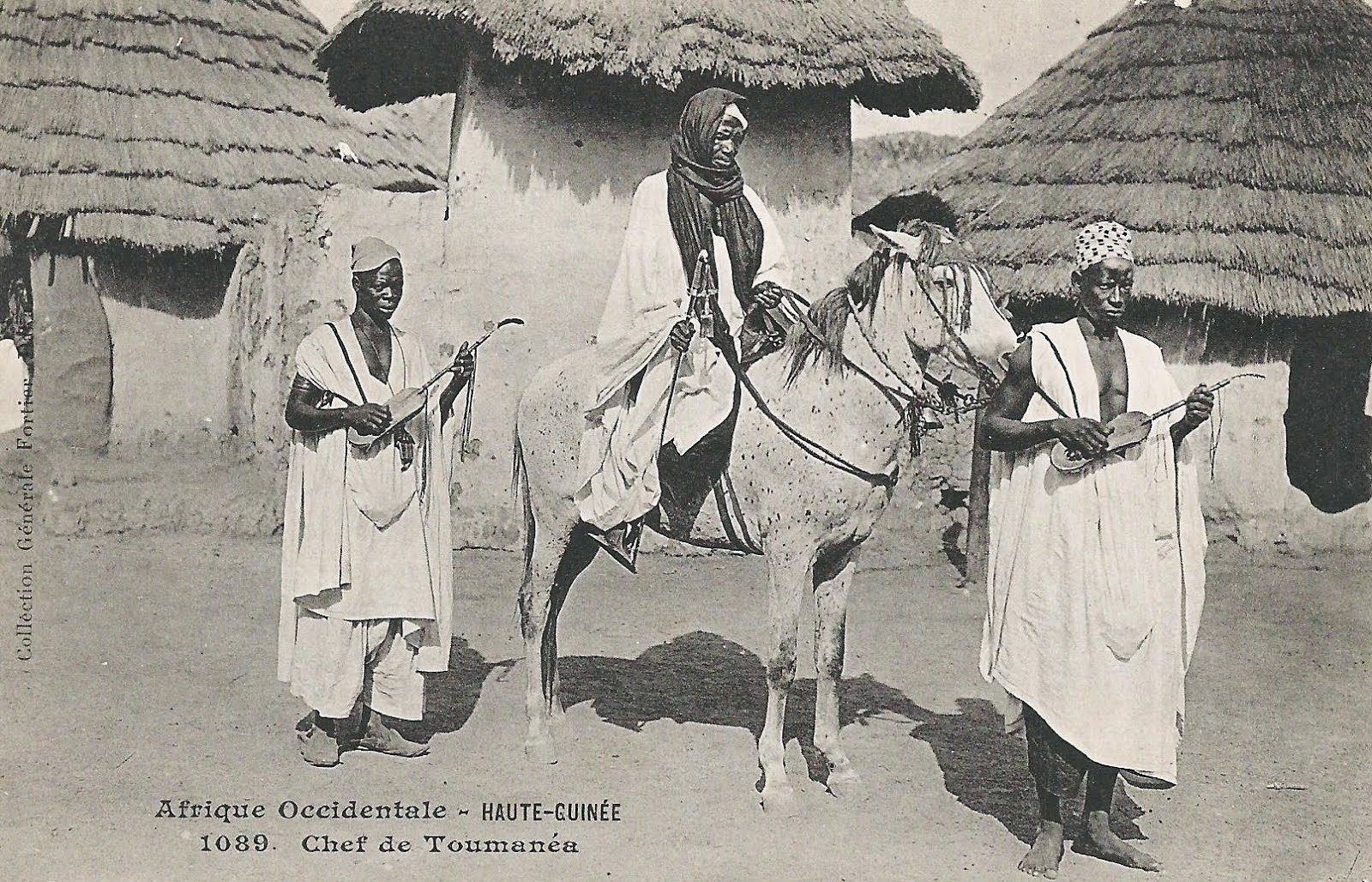
Guinea, circa 1905. Two griots accompany their lord, playing their instruments to announce his presence.

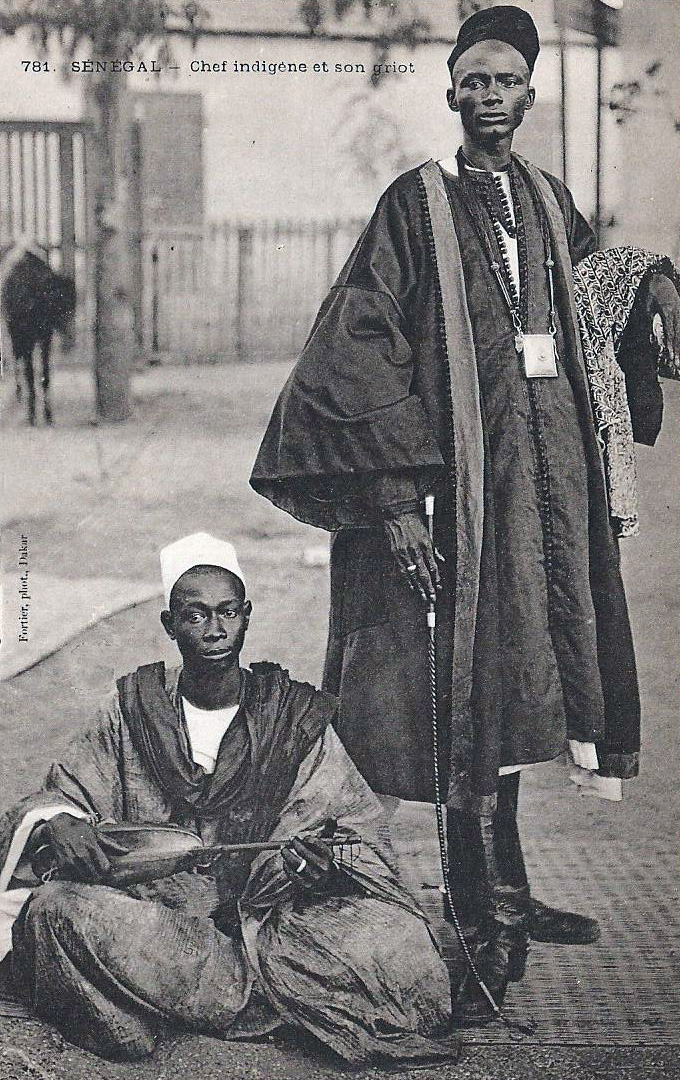
Senegal, early 20th century. A Wolof leader and his griot. The griot is holding an xalam (lute).

== Historical developments ==
=== Traditional vs. modern ===
The distinction between traditional and modern griots in Mande music is often described by scholars as fluid rather than set. These terms are flexible labels for different styles, not historical periods. "Traditional" often refers to older instruments and musical works, while "modern" represents performance with new technologies, growing ensembles, and global influence. However, in reality these elements are frequently combined.

In urban locations such as Dakar, Conakry and Bamako, jeli musicians commonly perform with both traditional instruments and newer technologies like electric guitars and amplification systems. These mixed performances occur at weddings, nightclubs, and international events. Toumani Diabaté and Keletigui Diabaté are performers who maintain inherited song traditions while incorporating global musical elements. For example, Toumani Diabaté's solo recordings feature the traditional kora while being produced in modern music studios that use contemporary tuning systems and recording technology. These developments show how innovation takes place within continuity, as traditional and modern practices coexist in West African music with the rise of globalization.

=== Colonial and post-colonial transformations ===
During the French colonial period, griots were increasingly regulated, especially in urban centers. In Saint-Louis, colonial authorities expelled griots from the city by issuing orders of arrest and imprisonment. Later regulations restricted public performance by creating limits on when wandering musicians could perform.

In 1930, colonial officials in Saint-Louis formalized regulations governing griot participation in wedding ceremonies. These rules limited drumming, set specific payment amounts, banned unsolicited performances in private homes, and imposed heavy fines for breaking the regulations. Therefore, traditional royal patrons became less common as traditional structures as a whole weakened. Due to the decline of kings, many griots began working closely with modern politicians. In countries such as The Gambia, Senegal, Guinea, and Mali, politicians developed strong ties with musicians, especially those involved in music recordings. The role of griots in society shifted with colonial rule as a whole.

In the post-colonial era, performance contexts expanded further into society. Griots began to perform in concert halls and recording studios due to the decline in shows for individual patrons. This shift away from personal patronage, along with new technology, changed the style of performance. The use of microphones, amplifiers, and jacks installed on instruments like the kora allowed for griots to perform for larger audiences. These developments reflect a transformation from caste-centered patronage toward political and global performance contexts. While some hereditary identities and core values remained, colonial regulation and new media technologies reshaped the social and economic structures supporting griot practice.

=== Present-day griots ===
Many griots today live in many parts of West Africa and are present among the Mande peoples (Mandinka or Malinké, Bambara, Bwaba, Bobo, Sosso, Dyula, Soninke etc.), Fulɓe (Fula), Hausa, Songhai, Tukulóor, Wolof, Serer, Mossi, Dagomba, Mauritanian Arabs, and many other smaller groups. There are other griots who have left their home country for another such as the United States or France and still maintain their role as a griot.

Today, performing is one of the most common functions of a griot. Their range of exposure has widened, and many griots now travel internationally to sing and play the kora or other instruments.

A recent archaeological expedition in Guinea-Bissau confirmed what many griots already knew—that there was a powerful kingdom called Kaabu encompassing modern-day Guinea-Bissau and Senegal whose reign lasted from the 16th to the 19th century.

Bakari Sumano, head of the Association of Bamako Griots in Mali from 1994 to 2003, was an internationally known advocate for the significance of the griot in West African society.

Pape Demba "Paco" Samb, a Senegalese griot of Wolof ancestry, is based in Delaware and performs in the United States. Circa 2013, he performed in charity concerts for SOS Children's Villages in Chicago. As of 2023, Paco leads McDaniel College's Student African Drum Ensemble. His own band is titled the Super Ngewel Emsemble. Concerning the goals of modern-day griot, Paco has stated:

If you are griot, you have to follow your history and your family, because we have such a long history. You have to be traditional and share your culture. Any country you go to, you share your family with them.

A griot can provide their services as a praise singer, but they can also use their position to speak out against someone who is rich or has political clout. As a result, the once respected status of the griot has been tarnished, and they may be viewed as "parasitic and manipulative."

Malian novelist Massa Makan Diabaté was a descendant and critic of the griot tradition. He argued that griots "no longer exist" in the classic sense, but he believed the tradition could be salvaged through literature. His fiction and plays blend traditional Mandinka storytelling and idiom with Western literary forms.

==== Hip hop and griots ====
Griot tradition has greatly influenced modern hip hop. The tradition of speaking a song to rhythm, for example, draws directly from griot performance style. This, combined with the griot tradition of storytelling, has led to comparisons of modern rappers to griots as "postmodern griots." Referring to rappers as "modern griots" is controversial, both among academics and rappers themselves.

Sociologist Damon Sajnani argues that the legacy of griots within west Africa - and particularly Senegal - is controversial. Rappers such as Fadda Freddy see themselves as continuing a militant tradition begun by griots, while Thiat sees griots as having been voices for the powerful rather than the voiceless. The ambivalent reception of the term "griot" for west African rappers is further supported by the work of Thomas Hale, who argues that the term itself has become positive for the African diaspora while negative for those in west Africa.

Baruti Kopano, however, argues that rap is a continuation of African oral tradition through its celebration of that tradition and expansion of explicitly Black oral traditions. This version of the griot reflects the viewpoint of the African diaspora and a reclamation of the term. Historian Frederick Gooding Jr. argues that rap is a direct continuation of the griot tradition through both its social advocacy and its direct lineage to African oral tradition.

== Notable griots ==
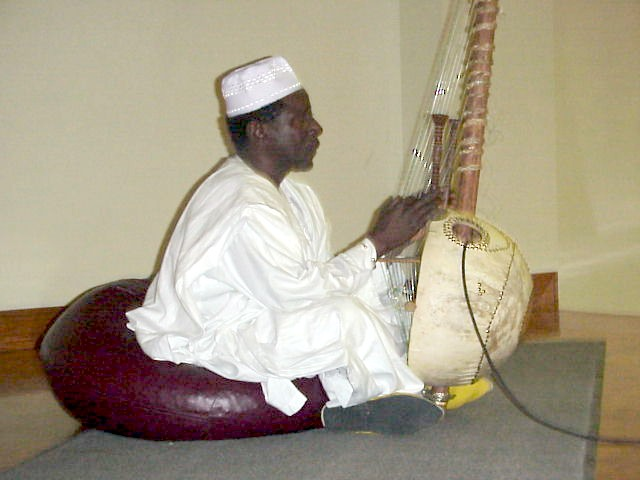
Mandinka griot Al-Haji Papa Susso performing songs from the oral tradition of the Gambia on the kora

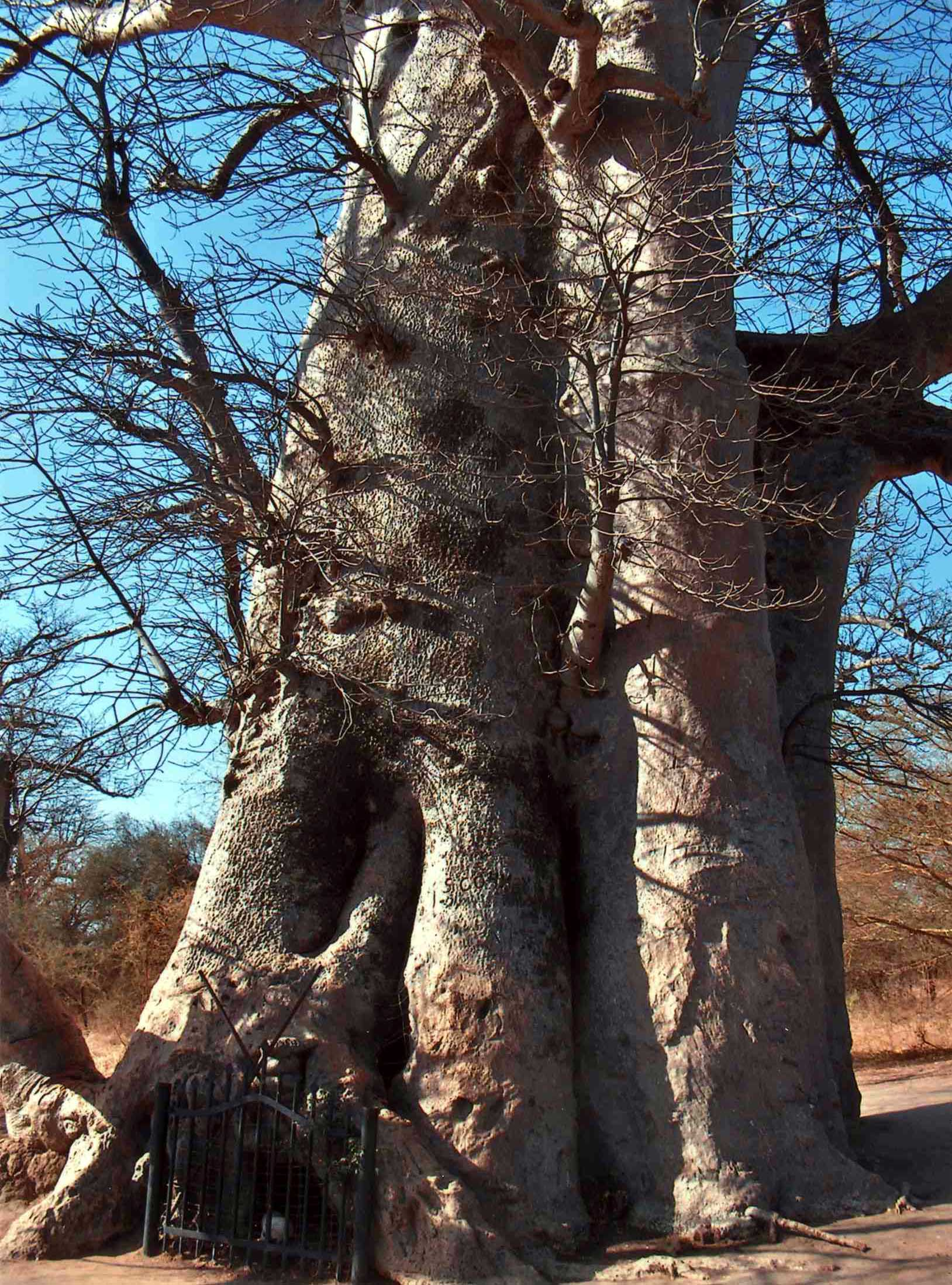
This ancient baobab tree in the Réserve de Bandia, Sénégal, forms a living mausoleum for the remains of famed local griots.

=== Burkina Faso ===
- Sotigui Kouyaté
- Dani Kouyate
- Dramane Koné

=== The Gambia ===
- Lamin Saho
- Foday Musa Suso
- Papa Susso
- Musa Ngum
- Bai Konte
- Dembo Konte
- Jaliba Kuyateh
- Jali Nyama Suso
- Sona Jobarteh
- Alhaji Dodou Nying Koliyandeh

=== Ghana ===
- Osei Korankye

=== Guinea ===
- Djanka Tassey Condé
- Sona Tata Conde
- Djeli Moussa Diawara or Jali Musa Jawara
- N'Faly Kouyate
- Sory Kandia Kouyaté
- Mory Kouyate
- Kandia Kouyate
- Djeli Fodé Kouyaté
- Djelikaba Bintou Kouyaté
- Sekouba Bambino Diabaté
- Oumou Dioubaté
- Cheick Hamala Diabaté
- Prince Diabate
- Sayon Camara
- Mamady Azaya Kamissoko
- Aminata Kamissoko
- Mory Kante
- Manamba Kante Bangoura
- Souleymane Bangoura
- Yaya Bangoura
- Mbemba Bangoura
- Yamoussa Bangoura
- Fodé Seydouba Bangoura

=== Guinea Bissau ===
- Nino Galissa
- Buli Galissa

=== Mali ===
- Abdoulaye Diabaté
- Baba Sissoko
- Ballaké Sissoko
- Lassana Hawa Cissokho
- Bako Dagnon
- Balla Tounkara
- Nainy Diabaté
- Cheick Hamala Diabaté
- Djelimady Tounkara
- Habib Koité
- Mamadou Diabaté
- Sidiki Diabaté
- Bassekou Kouyaté
- Fatou Niame Kouyate
- Toumani Diabaté
- Mariam Ba Lagaré
- Fatim Diabaté
- Babani Koné
- Bintou Soumbounou
- Oumou Sangaré
- Salif Keita
- Wa Kamissoko

=== Mauritania ===
- Dimi Mint Abba
- Malouma
- Noura Mint Seymali

=== Nigeria ===
- Dan Maraya Jos
- Muhamman Shata
- Taiwo Hassan

=== Niger ===
- Etran Finatawa
- Yacouba Moumouni

=== Senegal ===
- Ablaye Cissoko
- Soundioulou Kemo Cissoko
- Mansour Seck
- Youssou N'Dour
- Coumba Gawlo Seck
- Thione Seck
- Yande Codou Sene

== See also ==
- Azmari
- Bard
- Extempo
- Filí
- The Griot Museum of Black History
- Gusans
- Oriki
- Rapping
- Runo song
- Skald
- Sub-Saharan African music traditions
- TheGrio
