= Garaya (lute) =

Musical instrument

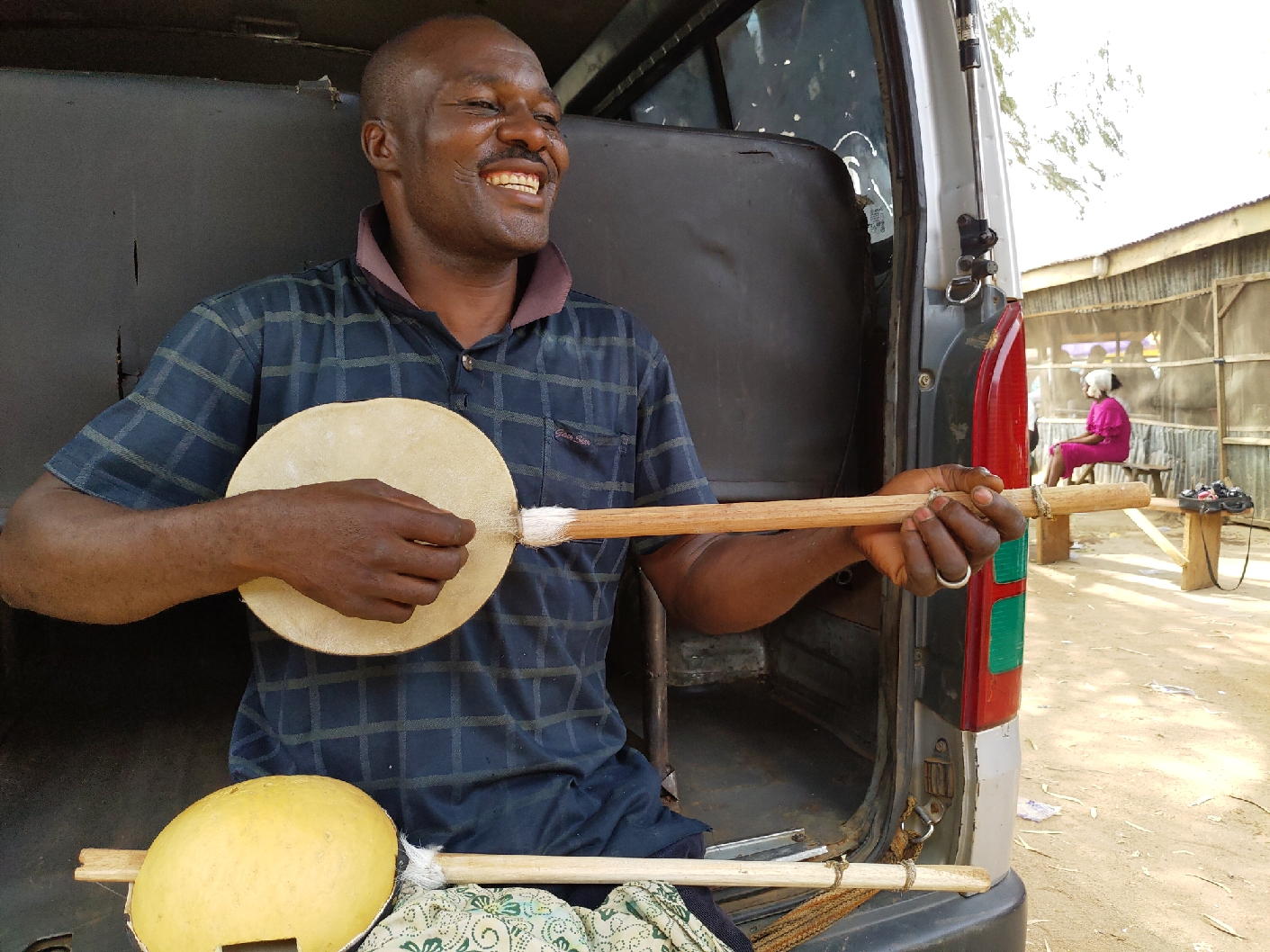
A man plays the garaya, a lute of Hausa and Fulani peoples. The Hausa version has a wooden body, while the Fulani use a gourd for the body.

The garaya or komo is an oval-bodied, two-string spike lute from Niger and Northern Nigeria.

This instrument traditionally has been played to make praise songs for hunters, accompanied by gourd rattles. It is also used for entertainment, accompanying song and dance. It also has been used in a religious context, part of the "bori spirit possession cult."

These lutes vary by ethnicity and size. The Fulani people and Hausa people both have their own versions. The larger version of the instrument is called the babbar garaya or komo. Babbar means large.

== Hausa Garaya ==
A garaya is around 50 centimeters long, plucked with a plectrum made from stiffened cowhide or hippopotamus hide. It is used by the Hausa people to play traditional music. The instrument has a wooden soundbox in the shape of an oval, covered with goatskin or duiker-skin and a neck that goes through both sides of the bowl. From the butt, the strings run across the bowl, and the loose ends are tied to tuning strings (which are wrapped around the neck as anchor points). The lute may have a metal jingle attached to the handle.

== Fulani Komo ==
The komo (also 2 strings) is equivalent to the garaya. It has a soundbox made from a gourd (instead of wood) and is about 75 centimeters long.

== See also ==
- Krar, a five or six-stranded bowl-shaped lyre used in Ethiopia and Eritrea
