= Järvinen =

- Language: Finnish

Origin
- Meaning: derived from järvi ("lake")
- Region of origin: Finland

Järvinen is Finnish surname of Virtanen type derived from the word "lake". It is the tenth most common Finnish surname. Notable people with the surname include:

- Akilles Järvinen (1905–1943), Finnish athlete and decathlete
- Albert Järvinen (1950–1991), Finnish guitarist
- Anna Järvinen (born 1970), Swedish–Finnish composer, singer and musician
- Art Jarvinen (1956–2010), American composer
- Carita Järvinen (1938–2022), Finnish-born French fashion model and actress
- Erkki Järvinen (1904–1991), Finnish athlete
- Esko Järvinen (1907–1976), Finnish Nordic combined skier
- Heli Järvinen (born 1963), Finnish politician
- Iiro Järvinen (born 1996), Finnish association football player
- Joonas Järvinen (born 1989), Finnish ice hockey player
- Josua Järvinen (1871–1948), Finnish schoolteacher, inspector of schools and politician
- Juhani Järvinen (1935–1984), Finnish speed skater
- Kalle Järvinen (1903–1941), Finnish athlete
- Kirk Jarvinen (born 1967), American illustrator and comic-book artist
- Kristian Järvinen (born 1992), Finnish ice hockey player
- Kyösti Järvinen (1869–1957), Finnish social scientist, politician and political scientist
- Martti Järvinen (born 1933), Finnish association football player
- Matti Järvinen (1909–1985), Finnish javelin thrower
- Mika Järvinen, multiple people
- Mikko Järvinen (1895–1953), Finnish politician
- Petri Järvinen (born 1965), Finnish football player
- Ritva Järvinen (born 1932), Finnish swimmer
- Teppo Järvinen, Finnish scenographer
- Timo Järvinen (1966–2025), Finnish speed skater
- Toivo Järvinen (1895–1947), Finnish farmer and politician
- Tomas Järvinen (born 2005), Czech-Finnish multi-event athlete
- Toni Järvinen (born 1981), Finnish football (soccer) player
- Topi Järvinen (born 1994), Finnish footballer
- Turo Järvinen (born 1982), Finnish former ice hockey forward
- Verner Järvinen (1870–1941), Finnish discus thrower
- Ville Järvinen (born 1997), Finnish professional ice hockey defenseman

== See also ==
- Matti Järvinen (disambiguation)
- Järvi
