= Susan Allen (musician) =

American harpist and educator (1951–2015)

- Born: May 10, 1951; Monrovia, California, US
- Died: September 7, 2015 (aged 64); Kirkland, Washington, US
- Occupations: musician; educator
- Musical career
- Genres: jazz; classical; experimental
- Instruments: harp; gayageum
- Years active: 1973 – 2015

Susan Allen (May 10, 1951 – September 7, 2015) was an American harpist and music educator. She was particularly known for her world premieres of music for both the classical and electric harp by contemporary composers. She performed in a variety genres—classical, experimental music, jazz, and world music. For many years Allen was also Associate Dean of the Herb Alpert School of Music at California Institute of the Arts.

== Early life ==
Allen was born in Monrovia, California, and grew up in Santa Barbara where she attended Santa Barbara High School and Laguna Blanca School. She began studying the harp when she was 12, studying and performing at the Music Academy of the West and with the Santa Barbara Youth Theater. After graduation from high school, she attended the New England Conservatory in Boston where she studied under Bernard Zhighera and later Marcel Grandjany. However, she chafed under the NEC's exclusive focus on classical music and after a year returned to California to attend the newly established School of Music at California Institute of the Arts (CalArts) where she studied under the harpist Catherine Gotthoffer. A member of the school's first graduating class, Allen received her BFA in Music Performance in 1973.

== Career ==
After graduating from CalArts, Allen moved to the Boston area and became active in several ensembles, including the Pro Arte Chamber Orchestra, Cambridge Chamber Players, Composers Chamber Ensemble, and Composers in Red Sneakers. She also began a career as a soloist as well as appearing frequently as a duo with flautist Robert Stallman. Allen and Stallman premiered Burr Van Nostrand's Ventilation manual: A dusk ceremonial for flute & harp at the 1976 Gaudeamus Festival in Amsterdam and gave its New York premiere the following year in their joint recital at Carnegie Hall. During this period, Allen premiered many new works for harp by composers who included Ruth Lomon, Elizabeth Vercoe, Thomas Oboe Lee, Roger Bourland, Hayg Boyadjian and William Thomas McKinley. In 1979 she recorded Germaine Tailleferre's Concertino for harp and orchestra with the New England Women's Symphony conducted by Antonia Brico and that same year gave her first solo recital at Carnegie Hall in a program devoted to new music for the harp. Her first solo recording, New Music for Harp, was funded by the Martha Baird Rockefeller Fund for Music and was released 1981 on Thomas Buckner's 1750 Arch Records label.

In 1983 Allen returned to Los Angeles where she joined the faculty of the CalArts School of Music (later renamed Herb Alpert School of Music), eventually becoming Associate Dean. She also served for over 20 years as the CalArts Faculty Administrator on its Community Arts Partnership programme and designed much of its curriculum. In addition to her teaching at CalArts, Allen taught and lectured internationally on harp and improvisation and held annual summer courses for young harpists. In a 2014 essay on her teaching philosophy Allen wrote:

Once a learner understands clearly that an instructor is only an authority by way of experience, the avenues for co-education have been opened. A learner and instructor here may set forth the notion of examining a set of ideas or issues together, while the instructor, rather than delivering truths or platitudes, may guide the student toward avenues for research, thought, process and self-discovery.

In parallel with her teaching career, Allen continued to perform and record. Among her performances in the 1990s were an appearance at Symphony Space with Adam Rudolph's Moving Pictures ensemble in its debut performance and a concert of world premieres for the harp at Merkin Hall which included Mel Powell's last work Seven Miniatures – Women Poets of China. In August 1998 she also played the electric harp with a quartet of Indian musicians before an audience of 10,000 in a concert at Hyderabad. The concert, part of the celebrations for the 50th year of India's independence, was broadcast live on Indian national television and radio. Her later performances included the world premiere of Andre Cormier's Piling Sand, Piling Stone at the CalArts Roy O. Disney Music Hall in 2003 and a concert of improvisations with Roman Stolyar in Denver 2008. Stolyar on piano and Allen on harp and the Korean kayagum performed again in a concert at the Roy O. Disney Music Hall in 2011 and released the album Together that same year.

Allen's last recording, Postcard from Heaven, was released in April 2015 when she had already been diagnosed with terminal cancer. Among the works on the album are two by John Cage with whom Allen had a close collaborative friendship, often improvising together in concerts from 1981 until his death in 1992. Towards the end of her illness Allen moved to Seattle, Washington to be near her family. She died at a hospice in nearby Kirkland on September 7, 2015, at the age of 64. Two months after her death, Jacques Burtin, who had recorded a series of improvisations with Allen in 2007 and 2012, wrote that although she could play the most difficult scores from Renaissance music to Pierre Boulez and was one of the rare harpists who could also play authentic jazz, improvisation was her "beloved child". Her book, Passage of Desire: Improvisation and the Human Journey was unfinished at the time of her death, but completed and published by colleague and collaborator Nicholas Chase (musician) in 2024.

== Works dedicated to Susan Allen ==
- Celebrations: Nimbus and the Sun God by Ruth Lomon (1978)
- Harmonium No. 3 by James Tenney (1978)
- Wake up! by Derek Healey (1979)
- Fertile Vicissitudes by Joyce Mekeel (1981)
- Twelve for Susie by Mel Powell (1981)
- One Thousand Sources by Jacques Burtin (2006).
- Perchance to Dream by Gloria Coates (2014)

== Discography ==
Recordings with Allen as the soloist or primary artist:

- 1980 Concertino for Harp and Orchestra by Germaine Tailleferre on Women's Orchestral Works, Antonia Brico (conductor). Label: Galaxia)
- 1982 New Music for Harp, recital of works by Ruth Lomon, John Cage, William Thomas McKinley, Roger Bourland, and George Rochberg. Label: 1750 Arch
- 1998 Duets with Vinny Golia. Label: Nine Winds
- 2001 Divertimento for violin & harp (Op. 3), Seven Miniatures – Women poets of China, and Twelve for Susie by Mel Powell on Mel Powell: Five Decades of Music. Label Nine Winds
- 2004 Ligatures, solo harp improvisations. Label: Tilleria
- 2006 Trialog with Roman Stolyar and Sergeĭ Belichenko. Label: Ermatell
- 2007 Renaissance with Jacques Burtin.
- 2011 Together with Roman Stolyar. Label: Tilleria
- 2012 NIRUSU III: MartinIIIs at the Maybeck, improvisations with Rus Pearson and Nicholas Frances Chase. Label: CAteliers (Independent)
- 2015 Postcard from Heaven, recital of works by John Cage, James Tenney, Alexander Tcherepnin, and Gloria Coates. Label: New World

Recordings with Allen as ensemble member:

- 1984 The Art of Joan La Barbara. Label: Nonesuch
- 1991 Harold Budd: By the Dawn's Early Light. Label: Opal/Warner Brothers
- 1992 Adam Rudolph: Adam Rudolph's Moving Pictures. Label: Black Saint/Soul Note
- 1994 Adam Rudolph: Skyway. Label: Black Saint/Soul Note
- 1995 Yusef Lateef and Adam Rudolph: The World at Peace: Music for 12 Musicians, recorded live at the Jazz Bakery in Los Angeles. Label: Meta Records
- 1995 Adam Rudolph: The Dreamer, opera in 12 movements. Label: Meta Records
- 2002 Four songs by Elaine Barkin ("for my friends' pleasure", "Octopus", "You are on that side", and "Witchcraft was hung") on Music for Instruments, Voice and Electronic Media. Label: Open Space 16
- 2010 David Myska: On the Steps. Label: David Myska : Bowl Records (Independent)
- 2012 Mark Abel: The Dream Gallery: Seven California Portraits. Label: Naxos
- 2014 Saturn's Rival, ensemble improvisations (Susan Allen, Maxwell Gualtieri, Ryan Parrish, Anjilla Piazza, Richard Valitutto). Label: pfMENTUM)
