= Burr Van Nostrand =

American classical composer

- Born: Bruce Burr Van Nostrand; 1945 (age 80–81); Los Angeles, California
- Occupations: composer; cellist
- Years active: 1960s – 2000

Burr Van Nostrand (born 1945) is an American classical composer and cellist. He is known for his avant-garde works which use aleatory and graphic notation and were composed from the 1960s through the 1980s. Van Nostrand was born in Los Angeles and began composing while still in high school in San Diego. He studied cello at Yale with Aldo Parisot and composition at the New England Conservatory under Robert Cogan. After his graduation from the NEC with a Masters in Music in 1971, he spent four years in the Netherlands at the Gaudeamus Foundation where several of his works were premiered. He stopped composing in the late 1980s but remained active as a cellist until 2000. There was renewed interest in his music following a concert of his early works at the New England Conservatory in 2012 and the release of a CD the following year containing his 1969 Voyage in a White Building I and two other works from that period.

== Life and career ==
Van Nostrand was born in Los Angeles, California. Both his parents were visual artists. He grew up in San Diego where he studied painting, piano, and cello and later composition with John Glasier and Howard Brubeck. He also became acquainted with the music and instruments of Harry Partch who was a friend of Glasier's. He entered the New England Conservatory (NEC) in 1964, but while still a student at Hoover High School he had already had his compositions played by the San Diego Symphony and the La Jolla Chamber Orchestra. At the NEC, Van Nostrand studied composition under Robert Cogan but during that time he also studied cello at Yale with Aldo Parisot. Van Nostrand was part of a close circle of composers studying at Yale in the late 1960s and early 1970s which also included Stephen Mosko and Humphrey M. Evans III. (Note: Humphrey Marshall Evans III (1948-1983) had been a child prodigy who was given a retrospective of his compositions at the Smithsonian in Washington at age fifteen and while still an undergraduate at Yale was the subject of a WGBH documentary which noted that he had been "accused of creating 'freaked out' sound instead of music." He later worked in New York for Maurice Girodias's short-lived Venus-Freeway Press and then as a literary agent. In 1969 he was one of the subjects portrayed in Alison Knowles's avant-garde performance art The Identical Lunch.) Known as the "bad boys" of the Yale Composition Department, they formed the ensemble Not Morton, Baby and took part in numerous concerts of avant-garde music, collaborative compositions, and multimedia performances.

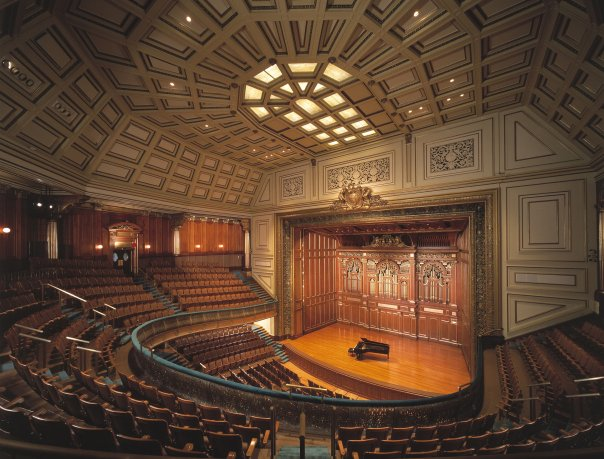
Jordan Hall at the New England Conservatory where Van Nostrand's Fantasy Manual for Urban Survival premiered in 1972

After graduating from the NEC with a Masters in Music in 1971, Van Nostrand settled for a while in New Haven, Connecticut, actively composing, giving guest lectures at the NEC and Wheaton College, and playing cello with the New Haven Symphony. In 1974 he received a four-year residency at the Gaudeamus Foundation in the Netherlands. There he continued working on his "Manuals" series which had begun with Fantasy Manual for Urban Survival premiered at the NEC's Jordan Hall in October 1972. His Ventilation Manual: A Dusk Ceremonial was premiered by harpist Susan Allen and flautist Richard Stallman at the 1976 Gaudeamus Festival where it received the AVRO Young Composer's Prize. Allen and Stallman gave the work's New York premiere the following year in their joint recital at Carnegie Hall.

Van Nostrand returned to the United States in 1978 and settled in Florida. His composing became more sporadic and he worked primarily as a cellist for several Florida orchestras including the Fort Lauderdale Symphony and Palm Beach Opera. His last composition was Nighlines. It was a commission from the California E.A.R. Unit, a Los Angeles-based new-music collective, and had its world premiere in 1988. Van Nostrand retired from composing after 1988 and returned to live in New Haven where he remained active as a cellist until 2000.

There was renewed interest in Van Nostrand's music in 2012 after Jason Belcher, a graduate student at NEC, heard a tape of Van Nostrand's Voyage in a White Building I which led to him retrieving other scores by Van Nostrand from the American Composers Alliance archives. Struck not only by the music which seemed very ahead of its time but also by the visual beauty and complexity of Van Nostrand's graphic notation, he began a project to re-introduce the composer and his works. This began with a concert of his early works at the NEC in 22 April 2012, followed by a recording on New World Records released in 2013, and a further concert of his works at the University of Pittsburgh in 2014. His Fantasy Manual for Urban Survival was performed in New York City in 2015 in a concert by the ensemble Music on the Edge who had also performed the work in Pittsburgh.

== Works ==
- Trio Verbrougghe (for string trio), premiered 26 April 1964 at the Shakespeare Club in Pasadena during the award concert for the Coleman Chamber Ensemble Competition. It was played by Van Nostrand on cello, Larry Laffoon on viola and Paul Severtson on violin.
- Evocation of Quetzacoatal (for three cellos), composed 1969. A reel-to-reel recording of the work (date unspecified) is held in Harvard University's Loeb Music Library. It was also performed and recorded in a concert of contemporary music at Jordan Hall, Boston on 26 January 1971
- Voyage in a White Building I (for amplified violin, amplified cello, amplified auto harp, amplified flute, rock and other percussion, electric guitar, sitar, alto saxophone, amplified speaker, string orchestra), premiered Yale University, 27 April 1969; revised version performed Jordan Hall, Boston, 8 April 1970. The spoken text is from Hart Crane's poem "Voyage 1", one of the Voyages series appearing in his first poetry collection, White Buildings.
- Phaedra Antinomaes (for solo violin), premiered 5 December 1969 at Yale University; recorded 9 December 1969 at Jordan Hall, Boston. The work has three movements which can be played in any order. It was written for the violinist Paul Severtson, a long-time friend and collaborator of Van Nostrand. (Note: Paul Severtson has been a friend of Van Nostrand's since their high school days in San Diego when they formed their own string trio. He studied at the Yale School of Music during Van Nostrand's time there and was the concertmaster of the Yale Symphony Orchestra. As of 2017, he teaches violin and viola at California Polytechnic State University and is co-concertmaster of the San Luis Obispo Symphony.) Severtson premiered the work, played it on the 1969 recording and has subsequently performed it in concert in 2012 and 2014.
- Fantasy Manual for Urban Survival (for alto flute, cello, and prepared piano), premiered Jordan Hall, Boston, 1972. The work is in six movements and inspired by Friedrich Hölderlin's poem "Hälfte des Lebens". Midway through its performance, the musicians take turns speaking text from the poem.
- Tuba-Tuba (for solo tuba), composed 1973. This five-minute piece has one of Van Nostrand's most intensely graphic scores, drawn on a single large sheet of paper. (Note: For a reproduction of the complete one-page graphic score of Tuba-Tuba, see New Music Connoisseur (Spring 2016), p. 29.) Directions in the center of the page encircled by fragments of musical notation begin: "Play these melodic fragments in any order dispirsed [sic] throughout the other events on this page. Begin anywhere. You have five minutes to complete this page." It was played at the 2012 NEC concert of his works and concluded with the tuba player using the instrument as a magician's hat.
- Symphony Nosferatu (for two 10-member male and female choruses and an orchestra of piccolos, English horns, clarinets, bassoons, saxophones, electric and acoustic guitars, harp, prepared piano, celesta, vibraphone, percussion, and strings), composed 1973. The work has five movements.
- Emergency Equipment & Roadblock Manual (for flute and piano), composed 1974. It was dedicated to Robert Dick and Humphrey Evans.
- Lunar Possession Manual: A Winter Ceremonial (for soprano, piccolo, bass clarinet, violin, cello, piano, double bass percussion, and optional dancer), premiered during the ISCM World Music Days, Hilversum, 1974; US premiere, Boston Museum of Fine Arts, 2 February 1975. According to the composer's notes the vocal texts are based on Japanese haiku, extracts from Euripides' The Trojan Women, the names of Aztec deities, Pacific Northwest Coast tribal names, and Siberian chant.
- Emergency Plumber's Manual (for brass quintet and piano), premiered by Ensemble Pro-Contra, Rotterdam 28 May 1975.
- Ventilation Manual: A Dusk Ceremonial (for flute and harp), premiered during the Gaudeamus Festival, Rotterdam, 1976; US premiere, Carnegie Hall, 1 October 1977
- Earth Manual: A Dawn Ceremony (for soprano, piccolo, bass clarinet, violin, cello, prepared piano, and percussion), composed 1976, recorded Longy School of Music, 1977
- South Dixie Derailed... a subtropical toccata (for solo harp), composed 1982
- Nightlines (for flute, clarinet, viola, cello, prepared piano and percussion), premiered Los Angeles County Museum of Art, 25 May 1988. Originally titled Lovesongs of the Vampires, it was performed at the premiere by the California E.A.R. Unit conducted by Rand Steiger.

== Recordings ==
- Burr Van Nostrand: Voyage in a White Building I – Robert Stallman (flute), Jay Humeston (cello), Herman Weiss (piano), Paul Severtson (violin), New England Conservatory Chamber Ensemble conducted by Anthony Coleman. In addition to the title work recorded at Jordan Hall in October 2012, the album also contains Phaedra Antinomaes and Fantasy Manual for Urban Survival, recorded in Jordan Hall in 1969 and 1972 respectively. Label: New World Records
