= Matti Järvinen (disambiguation) =

Matti Järvinen (1909–1985), was a Finnish economist and as a young man javelin thrower.

Matti Järvinen may also refer to:

- Matti Järvinen (music), Finnish musician (born 1955)
- Matti Järvinen (ice hockey, born 1984), Finnish hockey goaltender
- Matti Järvinen (ice hockey, born 1989), Finnish ice hockey player

== See also ==
- Järvinen, surname
