= Helen Campo =

American flutist (born 1962)

- Born: November 21, 1962 (age 63); U.S.
- Genres: Classical, Broadway, Film score, Television music, Popular music
- Occupation: Musician
- Instruments: Flute, Alto flute, Piccolo, Soprano recorder, Penny whistle
- Years active: c. 1974–present
- Spouse: Danny Miller

Helen Campo (born November 21, 1962) is an American flute virtuoso. She has held the flute chair on nine Broadway shows, including the long-running hit Wicked. Campo has recorded extensively for films, television, and albums, including the 2005 Grammy-winning cast album of Wicked.

== Early years ==
Campo is the youngest of four children born to general surgeon Anthony Guy Campo, and registered nurse Helen Anne Turini Campo.

Campo began her studies of the flute at age eight with Deborah Richardson, and then with Ronna Asycue. During high school, she studied with Principal Flutist of the Philadelphia Orchestra Murray Panitz. At age 15, she became the recipient of the William Kincaid Scholarship to attend the Philadelphia Settlement School where she studied counterpoint, solfeggio, wind quintet with Shirley Curtis, long time bassoonist with the Philadelphia Orchestra, and flute with John Krell, long time piccolo player with the Philadelphia Orchestra.

Campo won her first concerto competition at the age of 12. At 13, as a freshman in Gateway Regional High School, Campo won a position in the Philadelphia Youth Orchestra under Maestro Joseph Primavera and became the youngest member of the orchestra. At age 16, she was named valedictorian at Gateway Regional High School.

Throughout her early teens, Campo also worked professionally as a member of the Haddonfield Symphony, Moorestown Chamber Orchestra and the NJ Festival Orchestra and performed extensively as a soloist and competition winner. During these teen years, she performed as concerto soloist with the New York String Orchestra, Philadelphia Orchestra, Haddonfield Symphony, South Jersey Orchestra, New Chamber Players of Philadelphia, Concerto Soloists of Philadelphia, and Cherry Hill Wind Symphony. In this period, she recorded solo programs for radio stations in New York, Boston, and Philadelphia. and performed actively as a recitalist in Europe as well as the US.

As a teenager, when she played a concerto with the Philadelphia Orchestra, the reviewer in The Philadelphia Inquirer wrote: "Mature Soloist wins bravos. She showed mature feeling for the misty style and considerable poise". During this same period, she was described in newspaper reviews as a "very fine, mature player", and "A dynamic performer who doesn't merely play to audiences, but beckons their involvement like some pied piper."

== Undergraduate and graduate years ==
Philadelphia College of the Performing Arts offered her a full scholarship to begin her Bachelor of Music degree at the age of 16. There she continued her studies with John Krell for one year and then transferred to New England Conservatory of Music (NEC), where she was the recipient of a full scholarship for the remainder of her degree. There she studied with flute virtuoso, Robert Stallman, and flutist/composer and new music expert, John Heiss.

In 1983 while at NEC, she became the youngest flutist ever to win the Concert Artists Guild competition, an honor she retains as of this writing. She was chosen as a 1983 Tanglewood Orchestral Fellow. She won the 1983 WFLN Radio Young Artists Competition and continued to record solo programs for many other radio stations, including WUHY Philadelphia, WQXR, and WGBH NY. While still at conservatory, she won the 1982 James Pappoutsakis Competition, the 1983 Margaret Yardley Award, and performed as a soloist in recital and with many orchestras including Plymouth Philharmonic Orchestra, Indian Hill Chamber Orchestra and in Europe as well.

Reviewers from this period wrote: "Her technique is impeccable. She varies her tone with a musicianly care well beyond her years, from bright aggressive clarity to soft throaty understatement." "The young flutist from New Jersey….is a solid player with a great deal of fluency . . . lean and forceful." "Campo plays a magical flute", "Talk about hitting all the right notes, Helen Campo’s been doing it almost from the time she learned how to play the flute…Miss Campo has won so many young artist competitions, she probably holds more medals than the whole US Olympic team took in Sarajevo", and, "Honors come faster than she can play the flute".

When she graduated, Campo was awarded the George Whitefield Chadwick Medal, named for the former director of New England Conservatory and awarded each year to 'the senior whose entire Conservatory record of achievement has been most distinguished.

Campo continued her studies with Robert Stallman at the Aaron Copland School of Music at Queens College under a graduate assistantship. She earned an MA and the CUNY Queens College-wide Graduate Achievement Award in 1985.

== Classical career ==
Through the 1980s, Campo continued her solo career on the Concert Artists Guild roster, traveling extensively to perform as a recitalist, concerto soloist and masterclass instructor. She became the first flutist ever to win the Artist International Distinguished Artists Award, and was named the 1984 "Young Artist to Watch" by Musical America. She also taught privately and at Brooklyn Conservatory of Music and was a member of more than 10 orchestras in New York.

In 1984 Leonard Bernstein wrote: "Miss Campo plays the flute the way I wish I could sing". In 1985, she was hired to play the summer season at the Metropolitan Opera, which was providing ballet music for out-of-town companies such as the Kirov Ballet, and The Royal Ballet among others.

Campo has continued to travel as a soloist and garner praise in the press world-wide: "such dazzlingly beautiful tone, that she could only be called extraordinary... she displayed stunning lucidity, colour, and figuration". "brilliant, yet never hard edged", "Dazzling technique…warm, sensuous tone", "A dynamic performer who doesn’t merely play to audiences, but beckons their involvement like some pied piper", "Ms. Campo drew the listener in with an alluring and sophisticated lyricism…a seductive gentleness abetted by Ms. Campo’s carefully varied coloration" and, "marvelous Helen Campo, flute, whose keen sense of color took you into a place of American dreams".

Campo is currently principal flute of the New Jersey Festival Orchestra and a member of The New York Pops. She was also a long-time principal substitute for the NYC Ballet, New York City Opera, and New York Philharmonic, having played all positions including piccolo in all three orchestras.

Campo teaches privately, both in Manhattan and online.

== Broadway ==
Beginning in 1989, Campo held the flute chair in nine consecutive Broadway shows including Topol's Fiddler on the Roof, Raul Julia's Man of La Mancha, Camelot, The King and I, Disney's King David, The Sound of Music, Jane Eyre, and Dance of the Vampires. She has been the flutist in Wicked since the long-running show opened in 2003. In addition to flute, Campo plays alto flute, piccolo, soprano recorder, and E flat penny whistle for Wicked. She is on the cast albums for The King and I, Disney's King David, The Sound of Music, Jane Eyre, Dance of the Vampires, and Wicked, for which she won a Grammy.

On playing both classical music and Broadway, Campo says, "At its essence…music is music whether playing symphonies or Broadway shows. There is always an opportunity for expression and dialogue…For me, communication is what is most important – whole worlds can be expressed in one note or in the silence between two."

== Film, television, popular music ==
Campo has played for hundreds of TV commercials, many films, and many classical recordings including several with the New York Philharmonic. She was the flutist for Nickelodeon's #1 TV show Wonder Pets! and The Backyardigans, and appeared on The Muppets. Campo has recorded with Ray Charles, Michael Jackson, Tony Bennett, James Taylor, Stevie Wonder, PDQ Bach, Sting, and John Legend among many others. She has also appeared on the Today Show and with Aretha Franklin and with musician Sixto Rodriguez on Late Night with David Letterman.

Campo has played on the soundtracks of many films including Disney classics Mulan, Pocahontas, Hercules, and Step Up 3-D (on camera), blockbuster movies including True Grit, You’ve got Mail, Doubt, Age of Innocence, and independent films including Basquiat.

== Personal life ==
Campo is married to Danny Miller, principal cellist in the Greenwich Symphony, and a fellow musician in the Wicked pit orchestra. She is the mother of writer/artist, Madeleine Rojas and jazz and Broadway drummer, Eladio (Eli) Rojas.
