= Art Jarvinen =

American composer

Arthur Justin Jarvinen (January 27, 1956 – October 2, 2010) was an American composer. Of Finnish heritage, he was the son of a Lutheran clergyman and grew up in Ohio and Canada. He attended the California Institute of the Arts, studying percussion with John Bergamo, Karen Ervin Pershing, and Ruth Underwood. He eventually studied composition there with Morton Subotnick, Stephen Mosko, and Earle Brown. In 1981, he earned a Masters of Fine Arts degree and began teaching at the California Institute of the Arts, as well as becoming one of the original members of the California EAR Unit.

Jarvinen composed over 80 compositions and worked closely with both Frank Zappa and Captain Beefheart.
