= Jacques Burtin =

French musician and filmmaker

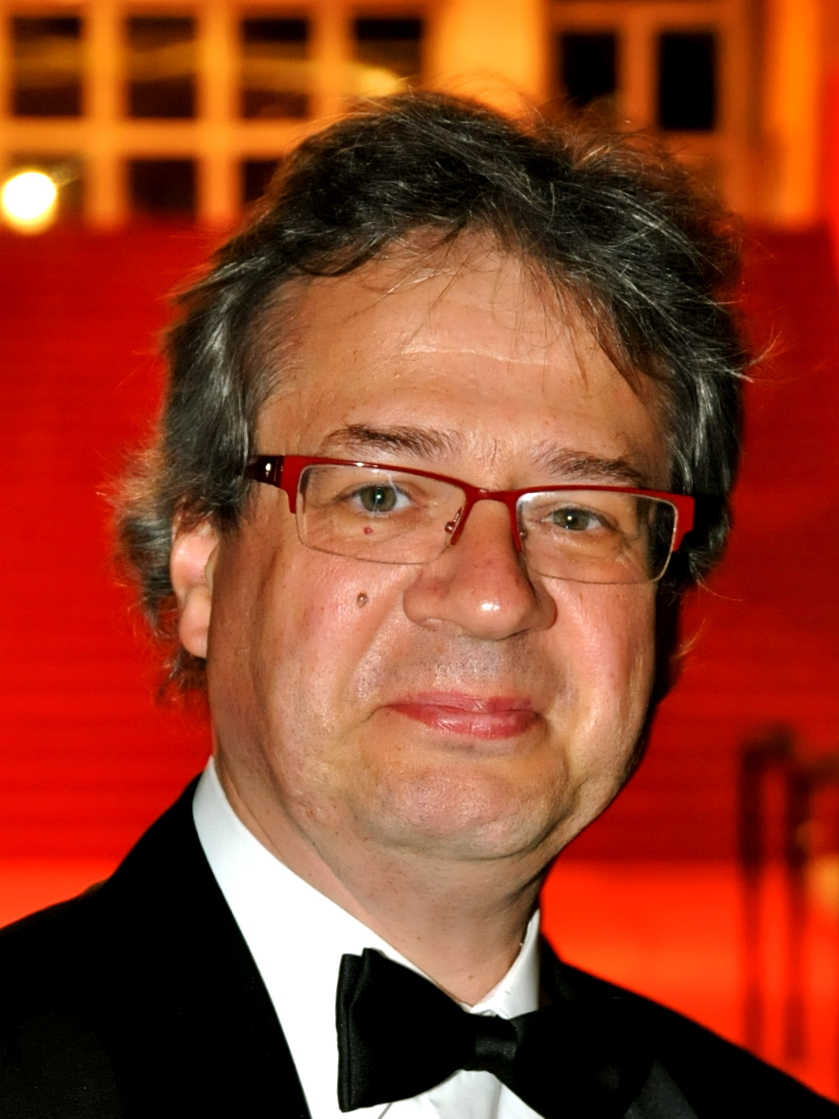
- Jacques Burtin at the 2012 Cannes Film Festival

Background information
- Born: Jacques René Carlos Burtin; 10 November 1955 (age 70); Paris, France
- Genres: Contemporary classical, Ambient, Experimental music
- Occupations: Composer, improviser, writer, film director, (experimental film, documentary film)
- Labels: Bayard Musique, Mara Productions, Studio SM

Jacques Burtin (born 10 November 1955) is a French composer, writer, producer and filmmaker.

== Biography ==
After studying Literature and Art at La Sorbonne (Paris), he was introduced to the kora by brother Dominique Fournier at the Abbey of Bec Hellouin (Normandy, France) and by brother Dominique Catta, composer and choirmaster of the Keur Moussa Monastery (Senegal). He began to compose for the kora, solo pieces as well as duets with Western instruments.

His works are inspired by poets like Grace Schulman and Christian Bobin, spiritual authors like St. John of the Cross or Etty Hillesum, writers like Georges Simenon or Hermann Hesse, painters like Henri Matisse or Jean-Michel Basquiat, or photographers like Nan Goldin or Diane Arbus. He collaborates with artists, dancers and poets and conceives interdisciplinary performances.

Jacques Burtin is also involved in improvised music and has given concerts based on improvisation with harpist Susan Allen, French panflute player Jean-Claude Mara, Japanese koto player Damien Harada, and French saxophonist Tullia Morand.

In 1997, Jacques Burtin meets Susan Allen, harpist, professor of harp and improvisation at CalArts (California Institute of the Arts). From their meeting until Susan Allen's passing in 2015, they see each other on a regular basis to improvise, give performances and exchange on musical pedagogy. In 2007, they release the CD Renaissance. After the death of Susan Allen, Jacques Burtin pays tribute to the American harpist by creating a dedicated website with unreleased testimonies, musical creations specially written by composers of all horizons and unpublished videos of their Paris sessions (harp and kora improvisations).

Between 2002 and 2012, Jacques Burtin gives seminars on Improvisation and Interdisciplinary Creation in the Faculty of Fine Arts School of the University of Basque Country, Bilbao, Spain, in collaboration with Spanish Choreographer Alicia Gómez Linares.

In 2004, he is invited by the Paul Verlaine University (Metz, France) to participate to the Colloque sur l'Art du Peu (Seminar on the Art of the Few): he gives a solo kora performance based on haikus and writes an essay: La Tentation du peu (The Temptation of the Few).

On 12 May 2006 his music is featured among the works of twelve composers from around the world in Sonic Channels, a concert hosted by the New School University and the Lower Manhattan Cultural Council.

Since 2006, Jacques Burtin also plays the gravi-kora and composes for this instrument. He gives kora and gravi-kora master classes and works on kora pedagogy.

Jacques Burtin writes, produces and directs poetic and experimental short films as well as documentaries on contemporary artists. His films What damns me saves me and The Dialogue of Shadows were screened at the Festival de Cannes in 2011 and 2012. The Child of La République was screened at the Bilbao Short Film Festival Zinebi in 2015.

Burtin is currently working on a multidisciplinary project based on the twenty-two Major Arcana of the Tarot of Marseille. An homage to his late colleague, harpist Susan Allen, this project explores the creative act via improvisation.

== Musical works ==
Kora sheet music (fragment of the score of One Thousand Sources, for solo kora, by Jacques Burtin).

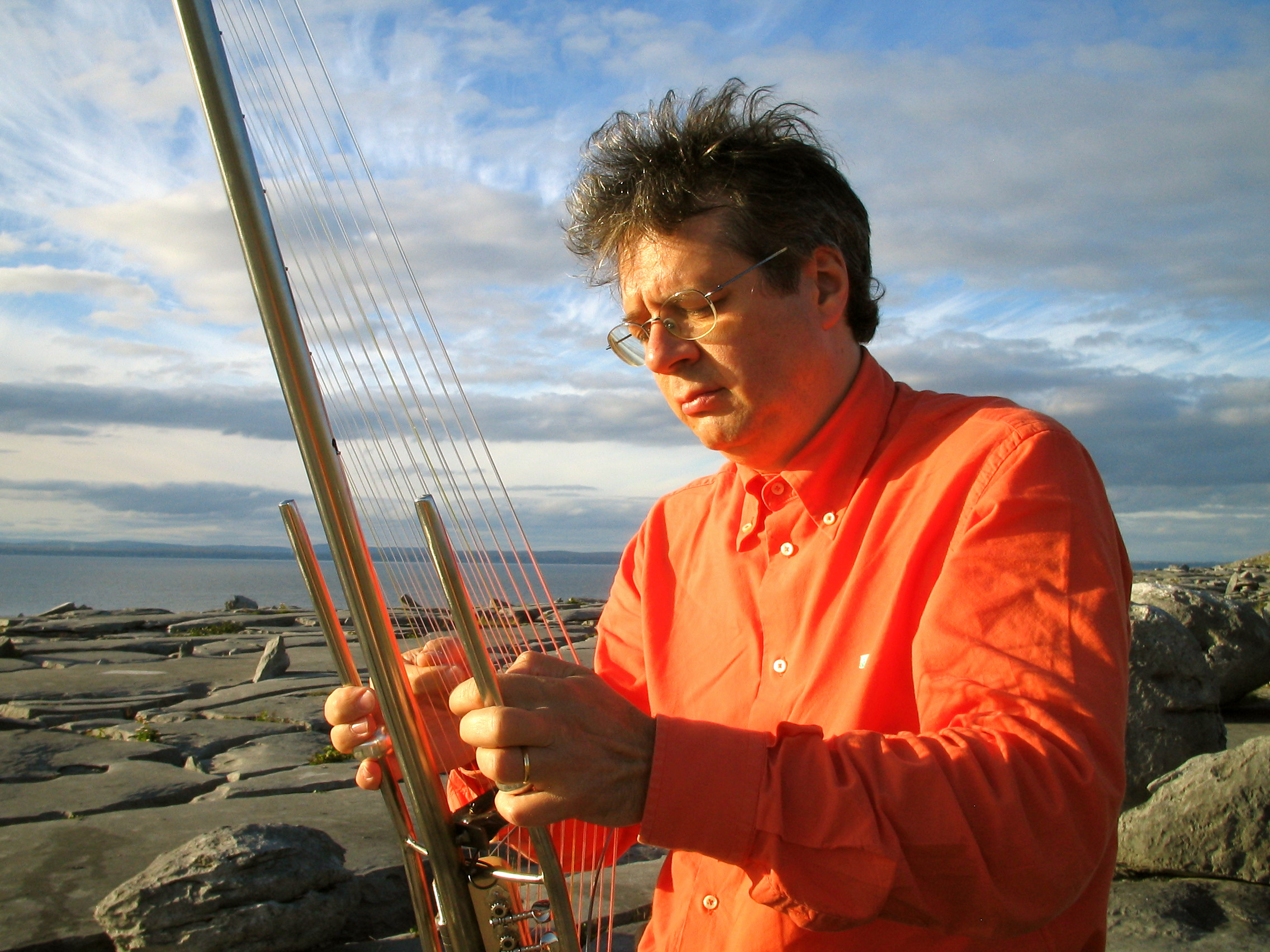
Jacques Burtin playing the gravi-kora, Ireland, August 2006

- 1986 – Ballade de l'île d'Yeu, for solo kora
- 1988 – L'Annonce à Zacharie (The Announcement to Zacharias), for viola and kora
- 1989 – Tant et tant d'amour (A Love so great, so deep), suite for flute and kora inspired by Georges Simenon's autobiography Mémoires intimes.
- 1989 – La Passion selon saint Jean (The Passion according to Saint John), oratorio for tenor, kora and two narrators
- 1990 – Le Maître du Haut Château (The Man in the High Castle), suite for piano, kora, saxophone and synthesizers inspired by Philip K. Dick's novel.
- 1991 – Le Jeu des perles de verre (The Glass Bead Game), suite for flute, viola, guitar and three koras inspired by Hermann Hesse's novel.
- 1992 – Ave Maria for soprano a capella
- 1993 – Les Nus bleus (Blue Nudes), suite for solo flute inspired by the paper cutouts of Henri Matisse
- 1996 – L'Amour – Musiques pour Thérèse (Love – Music for Thérèse), suite for kora, recorder, cello and koto
- 1997 – Music for Michael Lonsdale's play Vous m'appellerez Petite Thérèse
- 1998 – La Traversée de Bilbao, dedicated to Nan Goldin, for voice, saxophone and tapes.
- 1998 – Music for Benoît Lardières's play Les sept vies d'Homère Petitbois (The Seven lives of Homère Petitbois)
- 1999 – Où est ton coeur, est la musique (Where is your Heart, is Music), for accordion and kora
- 2001 – Eloge de la Lumière (Praise for the Light) for kora, violin and electric guitar
- 2001 – Apuntes de Eduardo Chillida (Eduardo Chillida's Notes), for a violin, a kora, a dancer and a narrator
- 2001 – Six chants syldaves (Six Syldavian Songs), for cello and kora
- 2002 – Music for Algis Arlauskas's film Carta a mi madre (A Letter to my Mother)
- 2002 – Lumière du monde (Light of the World), improvised suite for synthesizer, sampler and a Tibetan bell
- 2003 – Nouveaux chants syldaves (New Syldavian Songs) for viola and kora
- 2004 – Your Shadow Will Shine – Requiem Notebook, electroacoustic music – a Tribute to Victims and Survivors of 9/11 and other terrorist attacks
- 2006 – One Thousand Sources, for solo kora, dedicated to Susan Allen (musician).
- 2006 – Days of Wonder, suite for solo kora, inspired by the Book of Poems by Grace Schulman
- 2007 – L'Or jeté au fleuve (Gold thrown into the River), Kora Sonata No.1, in memory of Yves Klein
- 2007 – Music soundtrack for seven art documentaries by Vincent Gille (on the works of Max Ernst, Joan Miró, Sophie Calle, Paul Klee, the Menil Collection...)
- 2008 – Le Chant de la Forêt (The Song of the Forest), suite for kora, gravi-kora, flute and viola
- 2010 – Une clarté, une voix, un parfum... (A Brightness, A Voice, A Perfume...), Kora Sonata No 2
- 2013 – L'Enfance de l'Art, Suite for Gravi-kora n°1
- 2015 – Le Silence après la pluie, Suite for Kora n°6, inspired by the work of Christian Bobin and dedicated to him
- 2017 – Lazarus, for piano and soprano

== Poetic, experimental and documentary films ==
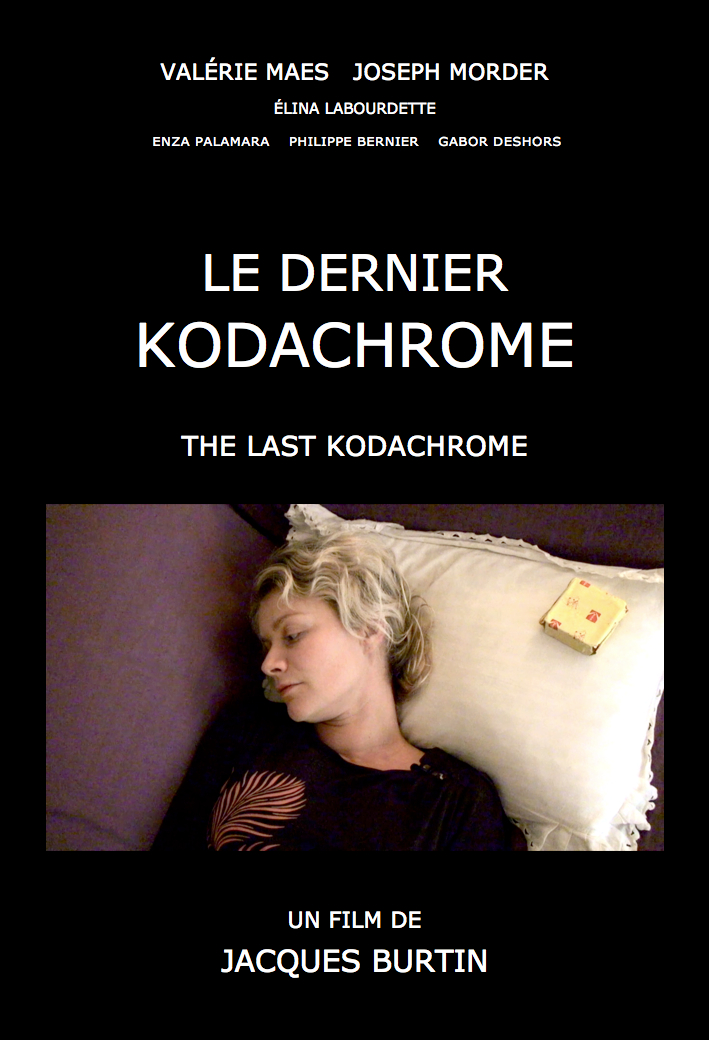
Film poster for the Jacques Burtin film "Le Dernier Kodachrome" ("The Last Kodachrome")

- 1977 : L'Innocence du grand large, an experimental film written, produced and directed by Jacques Burtin and Vincent Gille, Super 8, 20'20
- 1977 : Corps à corps, an experimental film written, produced and directed by Jacques Burtin and Bruno Montpied, Super 8, 12mn
- 1979 : Préface, an experimental film written, produced and directed by Jacques Burtin, Super 8, 41mn
- 1981 : Les Vacances de Platon, an experimental film written, produced and directed by Jacques Burtin and Vincent Gille, Super 8, 15mn
- 1982 : Magnificat, an experimental film written, produced and directed by Jacques Burtin and Vincent Gille, Super 8, 11'30
- 1982 : Brèves, an experimental film produced and directed by Jacques Burtin and Vincent Gille, written by Vincent Gille, Super 8, 10mn
- 1984 : Neuf Lettres, an experimental film written, produced and directed by Jacques Burtin, Super 8, 23'33
- 1997 – Autoportraits (Selfportraits), an experimental film written, produced and directed by Jacques Burtin, with Agnès Rivière, Vincent Gille and Jacques Burtin, music by Jacques Burtin, Hi8, 4:3, 34mn
- 2005 – Transmigration, a documentary film on the Czech artist Filomena Boreckà, written, produced and directed by Jacques Burtin, DV, 4:3, 15mn
- 2005 – L'autre regard (The Other View), a documentary film on the painter Alexandre Hollan, written, produced and directed by Jacques Burtin, music by Jacques Burtin, DV, 4:3, 19mn
- 2010 – Bilbao Dream, an experimental film written and directed by Jacques Burtin, produced by Iñigo Lopez and Jacques Burtin, with Mónica Serrano, Robin Caballero and Javier Cortés, music by Jacques Burtin, HD, 16:9, 6mn
- 2011 – Oxymorons, a documentary film on the Czech artist Filomena Boreckà, produced and directed by Jacques Burtin, music by Jacques Burtin, HD, 16:9, 8mn31
- 2011 – Les Carnets d'Enza, a documentary film on Enza Palamara's work, written, produced and directed by Jacques Burtin, music by Jacques Burtin, DV, 4:3, 28mn
- 2011 – Ce qui me perd me sauvera ("What Damns Me Saves Me"), an experimental film written, produced and directed by Jacques Burtin, music by Jacques Burtin, HD, 16:9, 7mn
- 2011 – Le Dernier Kodachrome ("The Last Kodachrome"), an experimental film written, produced and directed by Jacques Burtin, with Valérie Maes, Joseph Morder, Elina Labourdette, Enza Palamara, Philippe Bernier et Gabor Deshors, music by Jacques Burtin, HD, 16:9, 37min
- 2012 – Le Dialogue des Ombres ("The Dialogue of Shadows"), an experimental film written, produced and directed by Jacques Burtin, voices by Valérie Maes and Jacques Burtin, music by Jacques Burtin, HD, 16:9, 16'22
- 2013 – Le Crime sans fin ("The Endless Crime"), an experimental film written, produced and directed by Jacques Burtin, voices by Valérie Maes and Jacques Burtin, music by Jacques Burtin, HD, 16:9, 16'
- 2015 – Portrait de l'Artiste en Alchimiste et en Guerrier ("A Portrait of the Artist as an Alchemist and a Warrior"), a documentary film written and directed by Jacques Burtin, produced by Françoise Murillo, on the work of French painter Thierry Guého, music by Jacques Burtin, HD, 16:9, 24'
- 2015 – L'Enfant de la République ("The Child of La République"), a poetic, biographical and experimental film written and directed by Jacques Burtin, produced by Françoise Murillo, voices by Bernard Métraux and Jacques Burtin, texts by Tristan Corbière and Jacques Burtin, music by Jacques Burtin, HD, 16:9, 24'
- 2015 – Rencontre avec Roméo, a documentary film directed by Jacques Burtin, written by Jacques Burtin and Bruno Montpied, produced by Françoise Murillo, with French outsider artist Roméo Gérolami, music by Jacques Burtin, HD, 16:9, 18'
- 2017 – Les Îles de Lumière (Islands of Light), a film inspired on Christian Bobin's works, written, produced and directed by Jacques Burtin, music by Jacques Burtin (fourth movement of the Kora Sonata n°4), 8'

== Writings ==
- 1991 – Sacres, nine prose poems, La Goutte d'Eau, Paris
- 2004 – La Tentation du Peu (Temptation of the Few), in Actes du colloque de Metz 2004, Christine Dupouy Editor, L'Harmattan, Paris, 2008
- 2005 – Sang céleste – Lettre à Filomena Boreckà (Celestial Blood – Letter to Filomena Boreckà)
- 2008 – Le Dialogue de la forêt (The Dialog in the Forest), a conversation with Odile Portal
- 2009 – Chemins de l'art, chemins de l'âme – Musique, art et prière (Paths of Art, Paths of Soul – Music, Art and Prayer), an Introduction to the 3-CD Box Set Le Jour des Merveilles, Bayard Musique
- 2002–2010 – De la improvisación (About Improvisation), notes on improvisation for the Fine Arts Students of the Basque Country University
- 2012 - Les Origines, a conversation with Marie Zénon.

== Discography ==
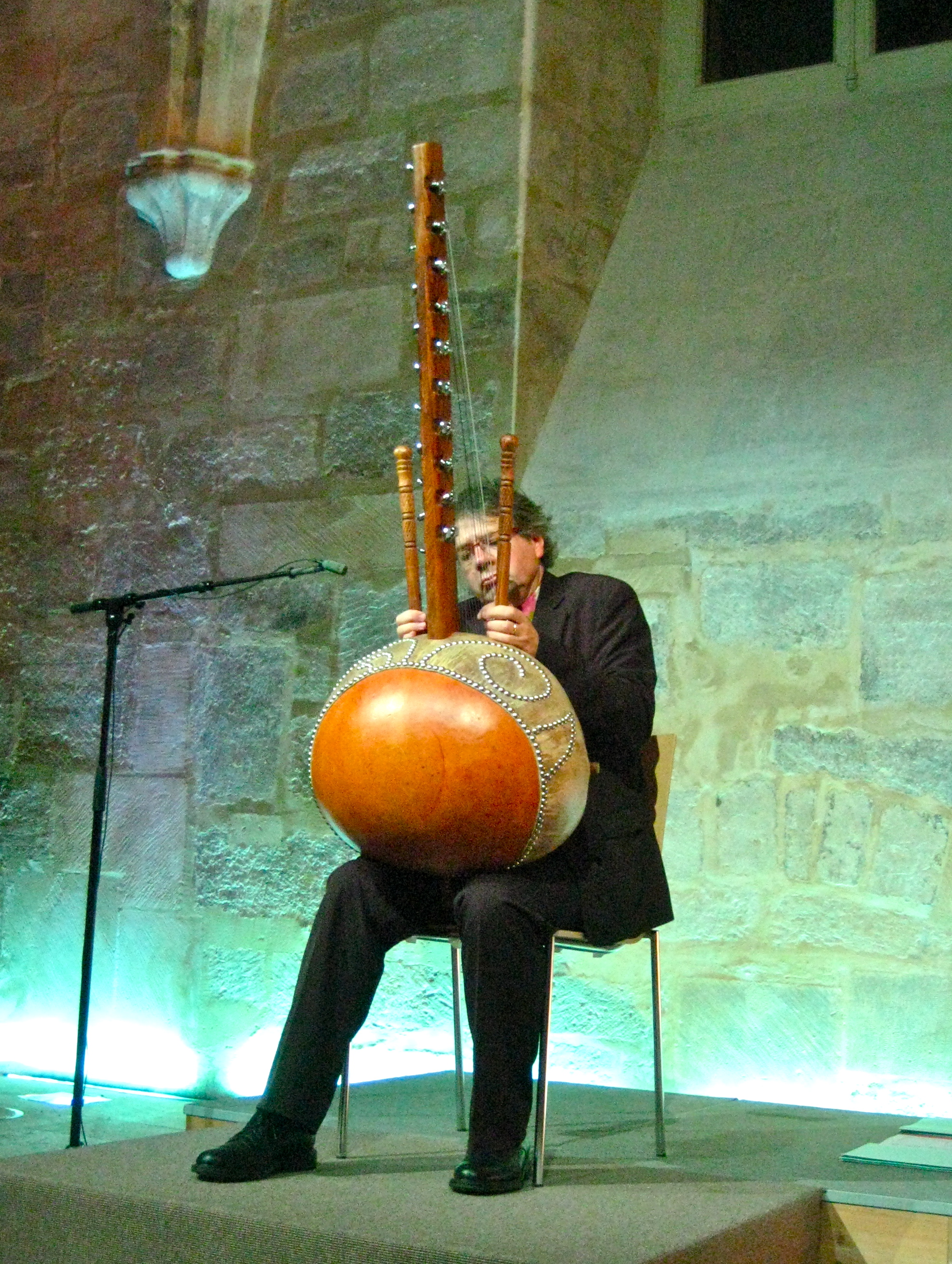
Jacques Burtin playing the kora at the Collège des Bernardins, Paris, October 2, 2010.

- 1990 – Jacques Burtin, Promenades heureuses – Le Maître du haut château, La Goutte d'Eau
- 1991 – Jacques Burtin, Le Chant des étoiles, Rosée de Lumière
- 1993 – Jacques Burtin, Noir & Or, Rosée de Lumière
- 1994 – Jacques Burtin, Kora à l'Abbaye du Bec-Hellouin (Le Chant intérieur), Studio SM
- 1995 – Jacques Burtin et Jean-Claude Mara, Psalmodies, Mara Productions
- 1996 – Jacques Burtin, L'Amour (Musiques pour Thérèse), Studio SM
- 1997 – Jacques Burtin & Soeur Claire Marie Ledoux, Une Rosée de lumière (Saint François et Sainte Claire d'Assise), with the voices of Béatrice Agenin and Michael Lonsdale, Studio SM
- 1998 – Jacques Burtin, Comme un cercle de feu sur l'eau, Edition limitée
- 2001 – Jacques Burtin & Barbara Marcinkowska, Méditation Kora et Violoncelle, Bayard Musique (re-issued in 2010)
- 2003 – Jacques Burtin & Michel Michalakakos, Méditation Kora et Alto, Bayard Musique
- 2007 – Jacques Burtin & Susan Allen, Renaissance (kora and harp improvisations)
- 2008 – Jacques Burtin, Le Chant de la forêt, with Jean Ferrandis and Michel Michalakakos, Bayard Musique
- 2009 – Jacques Burtin, Le Jour des merveilles, Bayard Musique
- 2012 – Jacques Burtin, Kora Noël, ADF-Studio SM
- 2016 - Jacques Burtin, Kora au Château de Saint-Fargeau - Musiques du Silence, Mysterium Conjunctionis

== Sheet music ==
- 1988 – Une Rosée de lumière – Neuf pièces pour kora, Monastère de Keur Moussa
- 1994 – Le Chant intérieur – Pièces et suites pour kora, Editions Musicales Studio SM
- 2006 – One Thousand Sources, dedicated to Susan Allen (musician)
- 2006 – Diptyque du Bonheur, dedicated to Mary Ann Caws and Dr. Boyce Bennet (includes "Danseuse espagnole" and "La Vie lumineuse et lente")
- 2010 – Joies soudaines – Oeuvres pour kora 1988–2010
- 2010 – Days of Wonder, dedicated to Grace Schulman
- 2010 – L'Or jeté au fleuve, Sonata for kora n°1
- 2012 – Kora Noël, Eighteen Christmas tunes for kora
- 2013 – Le Château de l'âme, Suite for kora n°1, inspired by The Interior Castle of Teresa of Ávila
- 2013 – Une Clarté, une Voix, un Parfum, Sonata for kora n°2, inspired by the Confessions of Saint Augustine
- 2013 – L'Enfance de l'Art, Suite for gravi-kora n°1, dedicated to Robert Grawi
- 2013 – Le Fantôme de Haydn ou la Sonate sans fin, Sonata for kora n°3, dedicated to Philippe Sollers
- 2016 – Le Silence après la pluie, Sonata for kora n°4, dedicated to Christian Bobin
