= Järvi =

Family name

Järvi is a Finnish and Estonian surname of Laine type meaning "lake". Notable people with the surname include:

- Harri Järvi (1939-2019), Finnish footballer
- Iiro Järvi (born 1965), Finnish ice hockey player
- Ilkka Järvi-Laturi (1961-2023), Finnish film director
- Jyrki Järvi (born 1966), Finnish sailor, Olympic champion
- Kristjan Järvi (born 1972), Estonian-American conductor
- Neeme Järvi (born 1937), Estonian-born U.S. conductor
- Okko Järvi (born 1996), Finnish basketball player
- Paavo Järvi (born 1962), Estonian-American conductor
- Raivo Järvi (1954-2012), a.k.a. Onu Raivo, Estonian artist, radio personality, politician
- Teet Järvi (1958–2025), Estonian cellist
- Toimi Jarvi (1920-1977), American football player
- Tyyne Järvi (1891-1929), Finnish swimmer
- Sami Järvi (Sam Lake) (born 1970), a Finnish writer, Max Payne video game series
- Michael Jarvi, independent pro wrestler

== See also ==
- Järvi Family, Estonian musical family
