= Järvi Family =

Estonian musical family

The Järvi family is a famous Estonian musical family, which was started by the Estonian conductor Vallo Järvi.

Members of the family include conductor Vallo Järvi and his sons, violist Andrus Järvi and cellist Teet Järvi, and Vallo's brother and fellow conductor Neeme Järvi and his children, sons Paavo Järvi and Kristjan Järvi and daughter Maarika.

Andrus Järvi is married to pianist Sirje Järvi and they have three children. Teet Järvi's wife is a pianist (Mari Järvi) and they have five children, all of whom are musicians, and who play together as the ensemble Järvi Instrumentalists.

== List of family members ==
- Vallo Järvi (1923–1994), Estonian American conductor
  - Andrus Järvi (born 1953), violist, married pianist Sirje Järvi
  - Teet Järvi (1958–2025), cellist, married pianist Mari Järvi (born 1959)
    - Marius Järvi (born 1981), cellist
    - Miina Järvi (born 1983), violinist
    - Mihkel Järvi (born 1985), pianist
    - Madis Järvi (born 1988), violist
    - Martin Järvi (born 1994), violist
- Neeme Järvi (born 1937), conductor
  - Paavo Järvi (born 1962), conductor, ex wife is Tatiana Berman, violinist
  - Maarika Järvi (born 1964), flautist
  - Kristjan Järvi (born 1972), conductor, composer and producer, ex wife is American-Canadian violinist Leila Josefowicz (born 1977)
