= Gravikord =

24 string, electric double bridge-harp

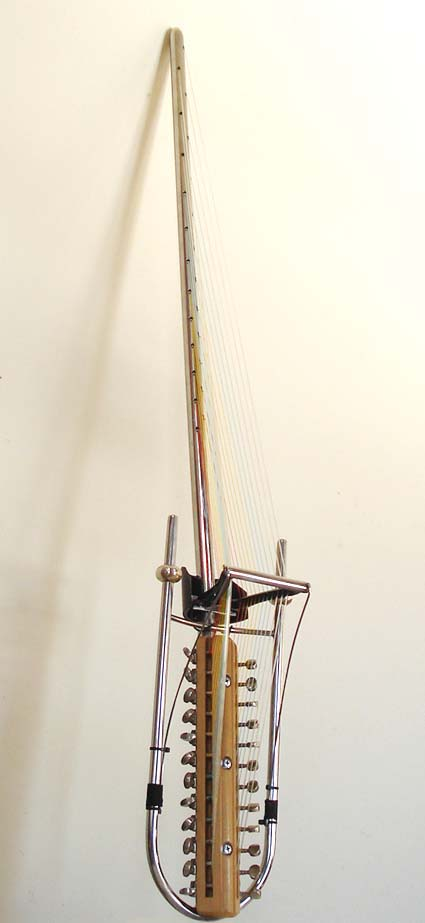
Signature Series Gravikord

The Gravikord is a 24 string electric double bridge-harp invented by Robert Grawi in 1984, which is closely related to both the West African kora and the mbira. It was designed to employ a separated double tonal array structure making it possible to easily play cross-rhythms in a polyrhythmic musical style in a modern electro-acoustic instrument. The Gravi-kora is a similar instrument, also developed by Grawi, which is tuned identically to a traditional 21 string kora.

== Description ==
The Gravikord is based on the West African kora. It is made of welded stainless steel tubing, with 24 nylon strings but no resonating gourd or skin. The bridge is made from a machined synthetic material with an integral piezo-electric sensor. There are two handles located in elevation near the middle of the bridge. The bridge is curved to follow the arc of a strum from the hands which hold the shortened raised handles directly in the palms. A metal crossbar at the top of the bridge functions as a mechanical tone control and bridge stabilizer. The instrument connects to an amplifier like an electric guitar.

The playing technique is similar to that of the kora: the player plucks the strings with the thumb and index finger of each hand. Because each hand can play "with" or "against" each other, simple techniques can produce music of great rhythmic complexity. However, the tuning of the Gravikord is not the same as a kora, and playing techniques are not directly compatible.

== African roots ==
Because of the deep cultural significance of cross-rhythms to sub-Saharan African music, several instruments from there have been designed to more easily generate cross-rhythms. Instruments such as the kora, donso ngoni, and mbira organize the notes in a uniquely divided alternate array, rather than the linear bass to treble structure common to many western instruments.

On these instruments, both hands can play freely across the entire tonal range of the instrument, rather than one hand primarily playing bass and the other playing treble. The fingers of each hand can also play independent rhythmic patterns that can easily cross over from treble to bass and back, smoothly or with varying amounts of syncopation. This can all be done within the same tight tonal range, without the left and right hand fingers ever physically encountering each other. When different rhythmic patterns are played by each hand, they produce complex cross-rhythms, including repeating on beat/off-beat pattern shifts that are difficult to create by any other means. This characteristically African structure allows simple playing techniques to combine, producing polyrhythmic music.

== History ==
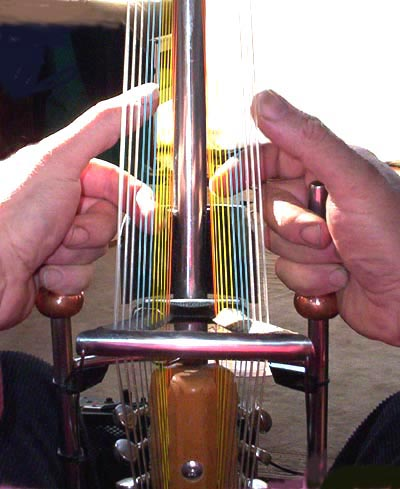
Hands playing position on Gravikord.

Grawi originally desired an instrument on which he could play polyrhythms more easily than on the guitar, and he refined the Gravikord's design over several years to meet this goal. The first prototype, made in 1974, was acoustic, and had a bamboo and fiberglass basket resonator with an animal skin head and a large bamboo neck. These first Gravikords already differed from the kora by having the tuning mechanisms removed from the neck and placed at the base, and an extensively re-designed bridge which also incorporated a kalimba that could be played simultaneously with the strings. Their tuning also differed, as they had 25 strings that were tuned symmetrically using a variation of the Hugh Tracey kalimba tuning system. Grawi made several unique prototypes during this period using wood, aluminum, and other materials, with features including stereo output and variable pitch, and finally patented the Gravikord in 1984. In the finished Gravikord, the body is made entirely of welded stainless steel tubing. There is no resonator; the tones of the twenty-four strings are amplified by a piezo-electric pickup in the bridge, and the instrument is made for natural and comfortable playing in a sitting or standing position.

== Tuning ==
The Gravikord is tuned to a diatonic scale. Its standard scale is in the key of G major/E minor. It has 24 strings, 12 on each side, and is structured like an extended Hugh Tracey kalimba, an already westernized African instrument. The range of notes on both sides are the same and tuning is strictly in an alternate arrangement (except for the lowest bass note), so that the playing is equivalent between the left and right hands. This is reflected in the way the holes are drilled in the neck and the choice of string lengths and weights. A constant finger picking pattern will produce a constant musical pattern throughout the instrument's range.

Throughout the playing range the notes of a scale rise strictly alternately and symmetrically, making all the intervals of adjacent strings on each side of the bridge in thirds. Directly opposite strings are consecutive notes in a scale. Octaves switch sides and are always in a constant spacing. Like the kora, the player tunes the instrument to the desired scale before playing.

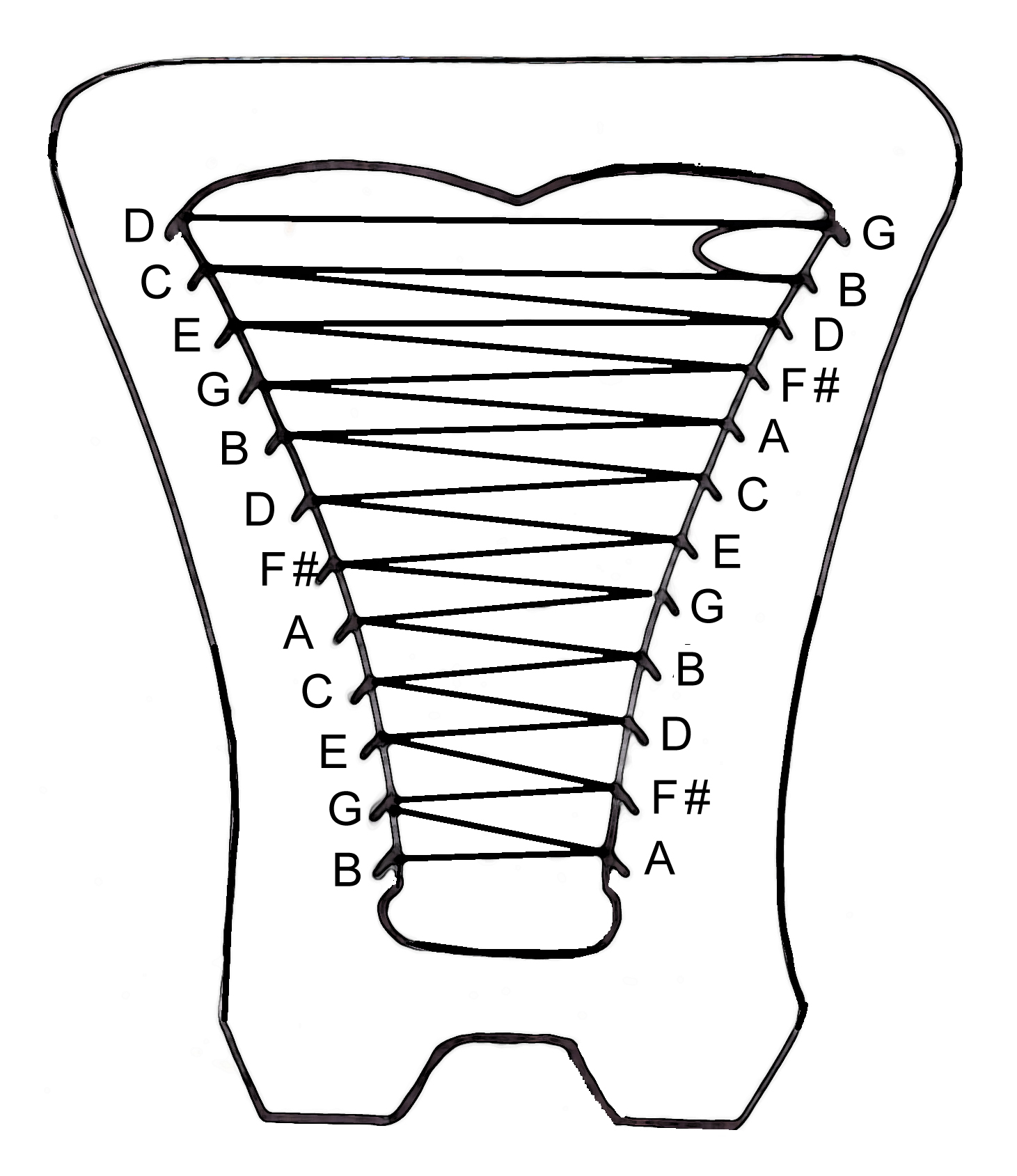
Gravikord Tone Layout in G major/E minor.

Gravikord general diatonic tuning:

Left: Sol1, Fa2, La2, Do3, Mi3, Sol3, Ti3, Re4, Fa4, La4, Do5, Mi5.

Right: Do2, Mi2, Sol2, Ti2, Re3, Fa3, La3, Do4, Mi4, Sol4, Ti4, Re5.

Tuning in G major/E minor:

Left Hand: D, C, E, G, B, D, F#, A, C, E, G, B.

Right: G, B, D, F#, A, (middle)C, E, G, B, D, F#, A.

== The Gravi-kora ==
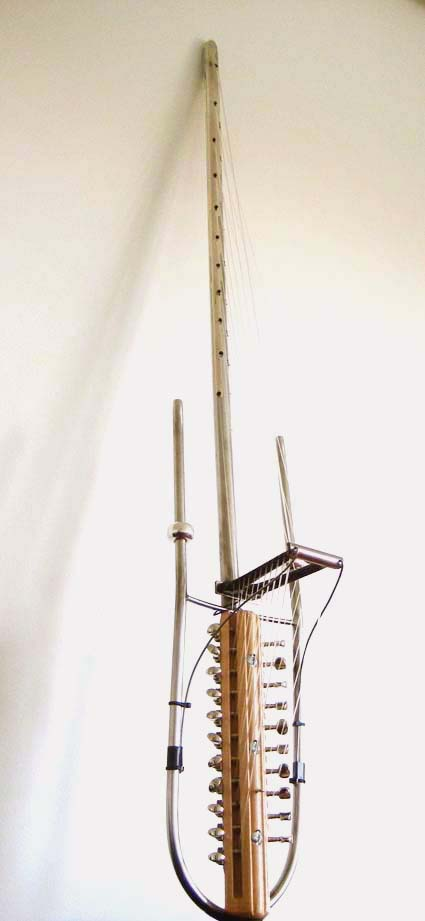
The Gravi-kora

Although the Gravikord is closely related to the kora, the musical knowledge of griots and traditional kora players does not directly transfer to Gravikord playing. The notes are not where they expect them to be and the bridge and hand playing positions are also different. Grawi developed the Gravi-kora for these musicians.

The Gravi-kora is set up tonally just like traditional koras. It has 21 strings, 11 on the left hand side, and 10 on the right. The instrument is held by hooking the little fingers around the handles, which are positioned below the straight sided bridge. The hand placement enables easy string muting while playing with the hand pads. However, the range of notes is not the same on both sides of the bridge. The left side is shifted more to the bass register starting with a cluster of the four lowest notes together. The right side is skewed more to the treble, ending with a cluster of the three highest notes. This is reflected in the way the holes for the strings are drilled in the neck, and the length and weight of strings used, which results in an asymmetric layout of tones where most of the strings directly opposite each other in the middle section of the bridge are tuned in octaves. This is a popular kora tuning.

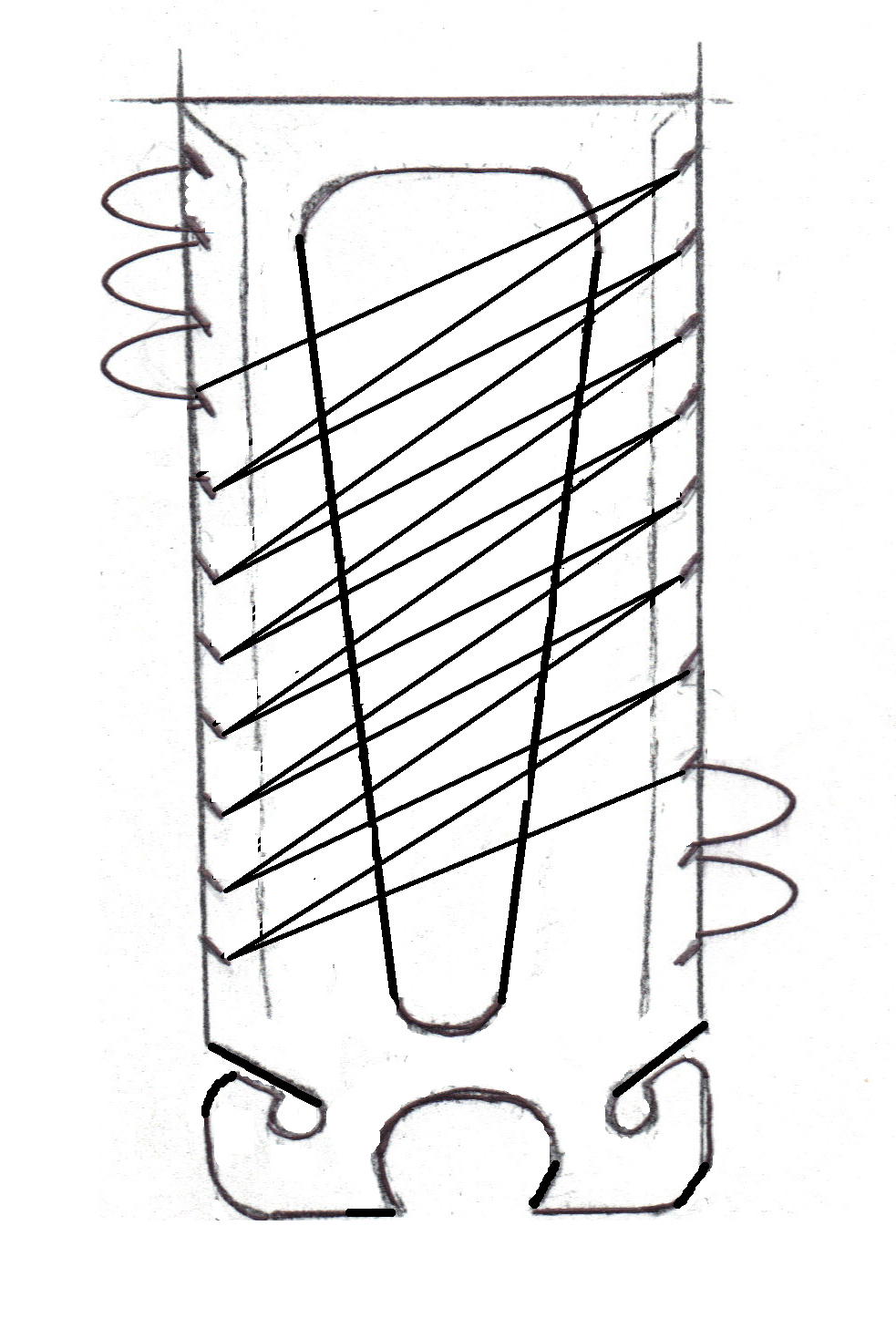
Tone Layout on Gravi-kora Bridge.

Gravi-kora general diatonic tuning:

Left: Fa1, Do2, Re2, Mi2, Sol2, Ti2, Re3, Fa3, La3, Do4, Mi4.

Right: Fa2, La2, Do3, Mi3, Sol3, Ti3, Re4, Fa4, Sol4, La4.

Tuning in F major/D minor:

Left Hand: F, C, D, E, G, Bb, D, F, A, C, E.

Right: F, A, (middle)C, E, G, Bb, D, F, G, A.

== The Chief Adjuah's Bow ==
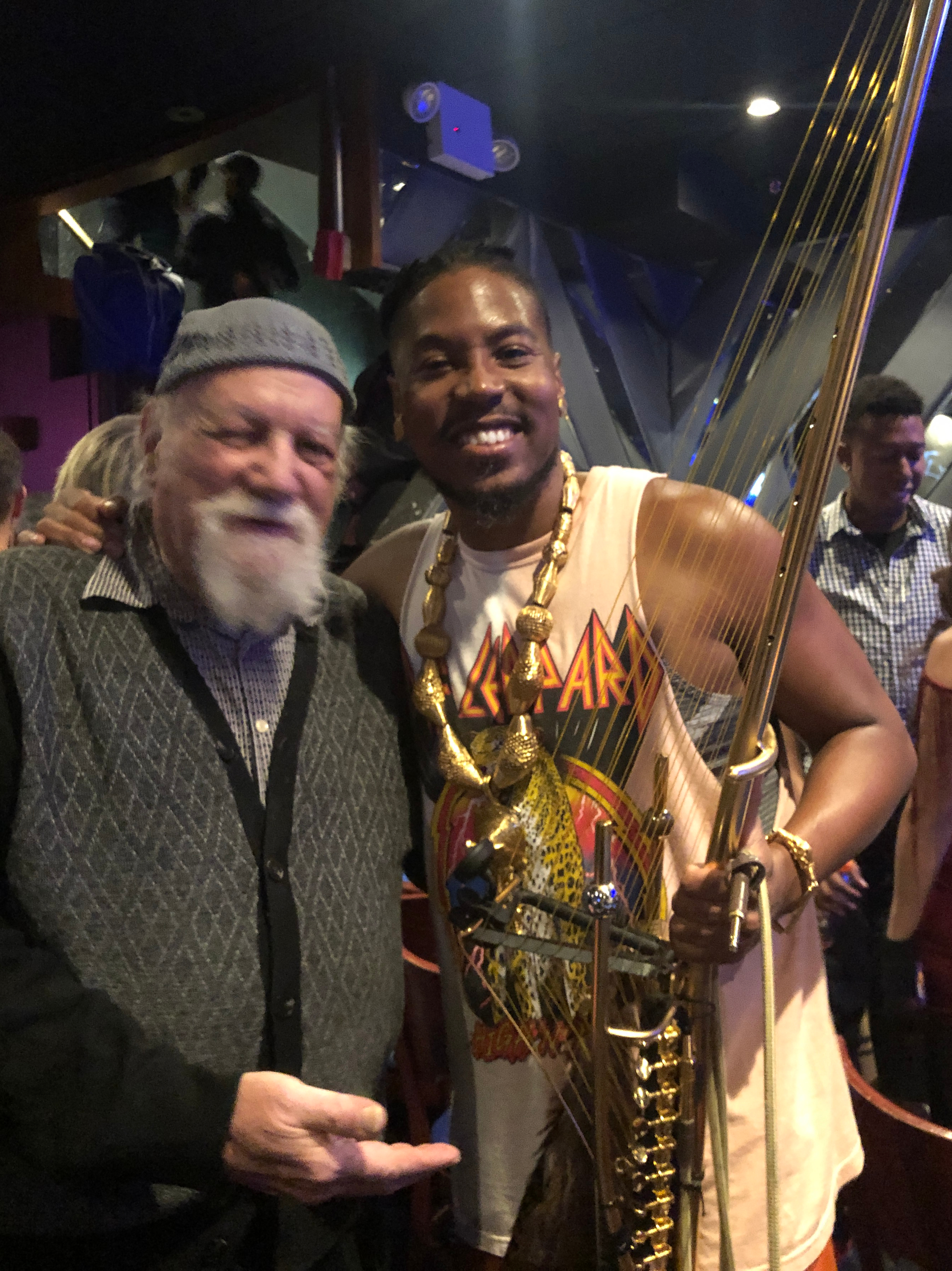
Bob Grawi and Chief Xian aTunde Adjuah with Gravikord model "Chief Adjuah's Bow"

This is a new model of the Gravikord which Bob Grawi designed in collaboration with jazz musician Chief Xian aTunde Adjuah a.k.a. Christian Scott. It is a 20 stringed instrument with a taller variation of the Gravi-kora's bridge resulting in wider inter-string spacing, with redesigned raised handles shorter than on the Gravi-kora, more like the Gravikord, allowing mid-string hand positioning, and holding the instrument in a natural manner. In addition it has a third small handle welded across the lower neck as a hand rest for playing one rank of strings with both hands. Since the taller bridge is less stable it also incorporates a back stay from the top of the bridge to the tuner block.

== Playing ==
Although both instruments are normally tuned to a diatonic scale, on slower pieces, accidentals can be created by sharping individual notes. This is accomplished by pushing and tensioning the section of the string behind the bridge with one finger while playing the string normally. This is similar to a technique used in Japanese koto playing. For faster chromatic pieces a pitch shifter can be used to make the instrument fully chromatic. This can be set to momentarily jump shift the entire instrument's tuning one-half step up or down, or it can be set on continuous pitch shift change which enables playing the instrument in dobro, slide guitar, or pedal steel guitar styles.

Since the Gravikord and the Gravi-kora produce no conflicting acoustic sound, they can be played with guitar effects such as delay, distortion, reverb units, or wah-wah pedals.

== Musical notation ==
Gravikord

Music for the Gravikord can be written in the grand staff, and people who cannot read music can play standard music scores. Because of its double structure and symmetric tuning system, all the notes on one side of the bridge correspond to the lines of the musical staff and all the notes on the other side correspond to the spaces. So, whatever key the music is written in, determine where the root note is, and let this be the position of the instrument's root note. If it is on a line, the other strings on that side of the bridge will correspond to the other staff lines, and all the notes on the opposite side of the bridge will correspond to the spaces. If the written musical root lies in a space then the opposite is true. The player can then read the music as if it were written in a tablature designed for the Gravikord.

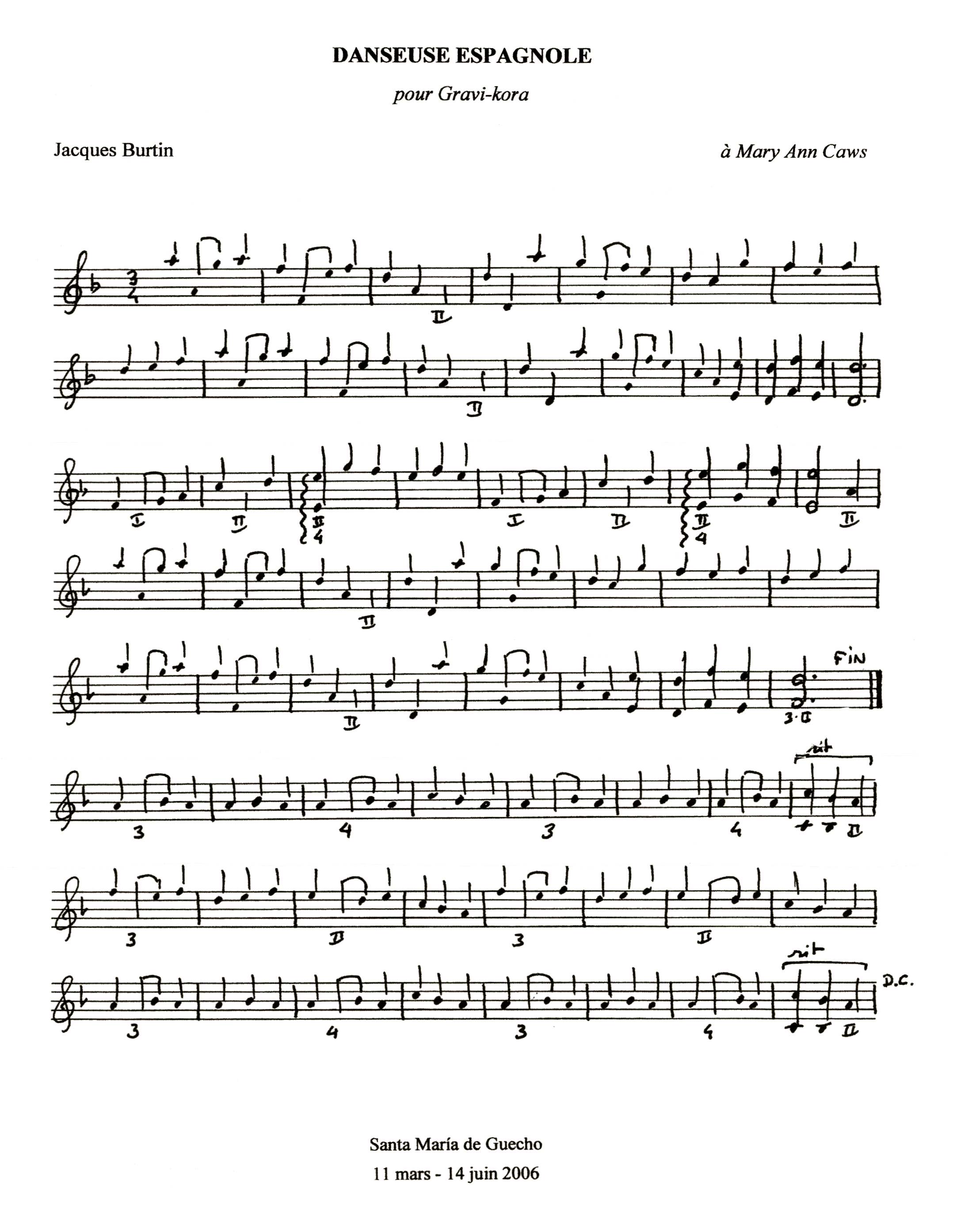
Gravi-kora score by Jacques Burtin

Gravi-kora

Music for Gravi-kora can also be written in the grand staff, but Gravi-kora scores can also be written on a single G clef, following the Keur Moussa system. This system was created for the kora by Brother Dominique Catta of the Keur Moussa Monastery in Senegal. The seven low notes that should be written on the F clef are replaced by Arabic or Roman numerals and written on the G clef. More than 200 scores already written for kora solo or kora and Western instruments can therefore be played on the Gravi-kora.

== Reception ==
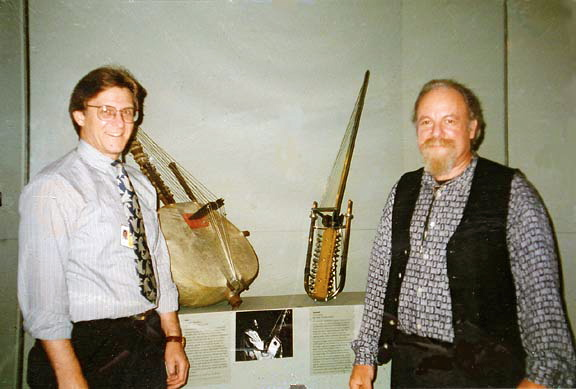
Robert Grawi (right), with Ken Moore (left), Curator of the Metropolitan Museum of Art show "Enduring Rhythms" (New York City, October 3, 1996 – August 3, 1997)

In 1988, Guitar Player Magazine published an article on the Gravikord, saying that "even though the Gravikord has a high-tech, modern-sculpture look, it actually has its roots in the African kora, a double strung harp... polyrhythmic music, plus the sound of the Japanese koto, African kalimba (thumb piano) and the African kora...[Grawi] began experimenting with bamboo double-strung harps that would allow him to perform separate melodies or accompaniments with each hand. Influences range from jazz, Dixieland, to Balinese gamelan and American folk music." This article also included a technical description of the instrument as well as a patent drawing of the Gravikord.

The Metropolitan Museum of Art included the Gravikord in the show "Enduring Rhythms" (New York City, October 3, 1996 – August 3, 1997). In an article about this exhibition in The New York Times, Rita Reif wrote "The show stoppers include a Gravikord, an electronically amplified stringed instrument that sounds like an earthy harp. In their shapes and sounds, Mr. Moore (curator of the show) said, these instruments also represent a kind of continuity in 'the layered rhythms, the mixed timbres, and all that movement which is so African.'" In March 2018, the Gravikord became a permanent exhibit in the museum's Andre Mertens Galleries for Musical Instruments.

In 2000, Elvis Costello listed Gravikords, Whirlies and Pyrophones, a collection of recordings of experimental musical instruments, in a list of the finest 500 albums of all time.

== Performers ==
Gravikord

Robert Grawi has recorded several CDs, as a solo player and with the Gravikord Duo and the Gravikord Ensemble. The Gravikord Duo consists of Grawi on Gravikord and percussion, and Pip Klein on flute; the Gravikord Ensemble adds David Dachinger on bassoon. Peter Pringle of Canada has recorded an improvisation for Gravikord & theremin, and Ziko Hart of Australia has recorded original solo music on the Gravikord. In 2024 a new album featuring the Gravikord on many cuts, was released - "New Modern Strings" – by Blake Leyh (Xenotone)

Gravi-kora

Foday Musa Suso featured an early version of the Gravi-kora in recordings with Herbie Hancock, and on his own CD New World Power. Daniel Berkman of San Francisco and Jacques Burtin have also produced original recordings.

== Discography ==
- 1988 – Making Waves – Bob Grawi (Take That Music)
- 1990 – New World Power – Foday Musa Suso (Island Records)
- 1991 – Rising Tide – Bob Grawi (Take That Music)
- 1996 – Cherries & Stars – Bob Grawi (Take That Music)
- 1998 – Gravikords, Whirlies & Pyrophones – Bob Grawi and Multiple Artists (Ellipsis Arts)
- 2005 – Calabashmoon – Daniel Berkman (Magnatune)
- 2008 – Le Chant de la Foret – Jacques Burtin (Bayard Musique)
- 2009 – Heartstrings – Daniel Berkman (Magnatune)
- 2015 – Headlands – Daniel Berkman
- 2015 – From The Heart – Ziko Hart (Mad CDs)
- 2017 – Getting a Good One – Bob Grawi (Take That Music)
- 2023 - Bark Out Thunder Roar Out Lightning – Chief Xian a Tunde Adjuah (Ropeadope)
- 2024 - New Modern Strings – Blake Leyh (Xenotone)

== Articles ==
The Gravikord has an entry in the Grove Dictionary of Musical Instruments. Other articles describing or referencing the Gravikord have appeared in the following publications: Curio Magazine, Daily News, Dirty Linen, Experimental Musical Instruments, Folk Harp Journal, Gravikords Whirlies & Pyrophones, Guitar Player Magazine, Metropolitan Museum of Art, New Sounds, Science News, Smithsonian Magazine, The New York Times, The Washington Post, and Vanity Fair, among others.

== See also ==
- Electric harp
- Kora
- Mbira
- Music of Africa
- Polyrhythm
