= Duplicates: A Concerto =

Duplicates: A Concerto for Two Pianos and Orchestra is a concerto for two pianos and orchestra by the American composer Mel Powell. The work was commissioned in 1987 by the philanthropist Betty Freeman for the Los Angeles Philharmonic. It was first performed at the Dorothy Chandler Pavilion on January 26, 1990, by the pianists Alan Feinberg and Robert Taub and the Los Angeles Philharmonic under the conductor David Alan Miller. The composition was awarded the 1990 Pulitzer Prize for Music.

== Composition ==
=== Inception ===
In an April 1990 interview with The New York Times, Powell recalled of his inspiration for the composition:

The idea for the work goes back to World War II, when I was in Paris and met an old musician who knew Debussy and would regale us with anecdotes. I've forgotten most of the stories, but one thing he told me has come back to me frequently over the years. It was about a time he and Debussy were having a glass of wine at the Chat Noir, and Debussy said: 'Do you know what the perfect music would be? A perpetual cadenza. It would be like a chain of gold coins, each like the other, but different enough to claim independence.' I've never forgotten that. And that became my goal for Duplicates.

=== Structure ===
Duplicates: A Concerto has a duration of approximately 32 minutes and is composed in three movements:

1. Onta
2. Three Interludes
3. "Onta" Variants

The second movement comprises three interludes respectively titled "Madrigal," "Immobile," and "Mobile."

=== Instrumentation ===
The work is scored for two solo pianos and an orchestra comprising piccolo, two flutes (1st doubling alto flute), two oboes, cor anglais, two clarinets, E-flat clarinet, bass clarinet, two bassoons, contrabassoon, four horns, three trumpets, three trombones, tuba, two harps, three percussionists, and strings.

== Reception ==
Reviewing the world premiere, John Henken of the Los Angeles Times gave the work modest praise, remarking, "Large in dimension and ambition, and uncompromising in the atonal complexity of its thought and deed, Duplicates impressed heavily, but only intermittently entranced, on its first hearing." He added:

Powell takes care of the major business in bookend "Onta" movements, and a lengthy, detailed business it is, working out all manner of contrasting and complementary duplicate ideas. The writing is mercurial but logical, a characteristically rational rhapsody scored in a colorful Messiaen mode. In between lie three interludes: Madrigal, Immobile and Mobile. There Powell cossetted the exhausted, perhaps exasperated, "Onta" listener with brief, beguiling movements of clear character and purpose.
