= California EAR Unit =

American chamber ensemble

The California EAR Unit was an American chamber ensemble dedicated to the performance of contemporary classical music. The group was founded in March 1981 in Los Angeles, California.

The original members of the EAR Unit were Dorothy Stone (flute); James Rohrig (clarinet); Amy Knoles and Daniel Kennedy (percussion); Gaylord Mowrey and Michael McCandless (piano); Robin Lorentz and Mary Terranova (violin); Erika Duke (cello); and Rand Steiger (conductor). By 1983 Terranova, Kennedy and McCandless had departed, and Arthur Jarvinen (percussion) and Lorna Eder (piano) joined. After many years with the same personnel, changes began to occur and one by one original members departed and new performers joined the group. Amy Knoles is the only remaining original member, along with longtime pianist Vicki Ray, and violinist Eric KM Clark.

The EAR Unit was formed at the California Institute of the Arts in 1981 by a group of students who had all been performing in the CalArts 20th-Century Players under the direction of Stephen "Lucky" Mosko. Inspired by their experiences with Mosko, and aware that Los Angeles at the time did not have a resident contemporary music ensemble, Steiger and Rohrig gathered a group of colleagues together after a rehearsal and in the meeting that followed in the CalArts Cafeteria the idea for the group was developed. The name EAR Unit was chosen sometime later, after many weeks of debate.

In 1983, the EAR Unit performed a concert at the Los Angeles County Museum of Art (one of the first of over 100 they would play there) featuring the West Coast premiere of Elliott Carter's Triple Duo, Louis Andriessen's "Hoketus" a satirical work written for the occasion by Nicholas Slonimsky, and the premiere of While you were Art, by Frank Zappa. Zappa asked the EAR Unit to perform the work silently while playing a synthesized recording, and they complied with his wishes, learning the piece and matching the recording precisely. But after the concert he told the Los Angeles Times that the statement of the piece "is that the whole of serious music in Los Angeles is as fake as the finger-synching in the piece."

In the 1980s, the EAR Unit often juxtaposed strikingly different works on the same program. At one of the first concerts in 1982, in a bank building in downtown Los Angeles, they presented a program that included works by Steve Reich, Pierre Boulez, Frederic Rzewski, and Donald Martino. Later, in San Francisco they combined Martino's Noturno with Stockhausen's Stimmung, and Subotnick's Key to Songs.

Beginning in 1987 the California EAR Unit had been Ensemble-in-Residence at the Los Angeles County Museum of Art. During that time they have presented over 500 premieres of musical works. Later they held court at REDCAT in the Disney Hall Complex in downtown Los Angeles.

In 1999 The EAR Unit received a Letter of Distinction from the American Music Center. Among the many other composers the EAR Unit has commissioned and premiered are Louis Andriessen, Eve Beglarian, Henry Brant, Kitty Brazelton, Joan LaBarbara, Annea Lockwood, Scott Lindroth, Robert Paterson (composer), Mel Powell, Terry Riley, Erkki-Sven Tüür, Wadada Leo Smith, Ann Millikan, Nicholas Frances Chase and Julia Wolfe.
