= Nicholas Chase =

American composer and performer

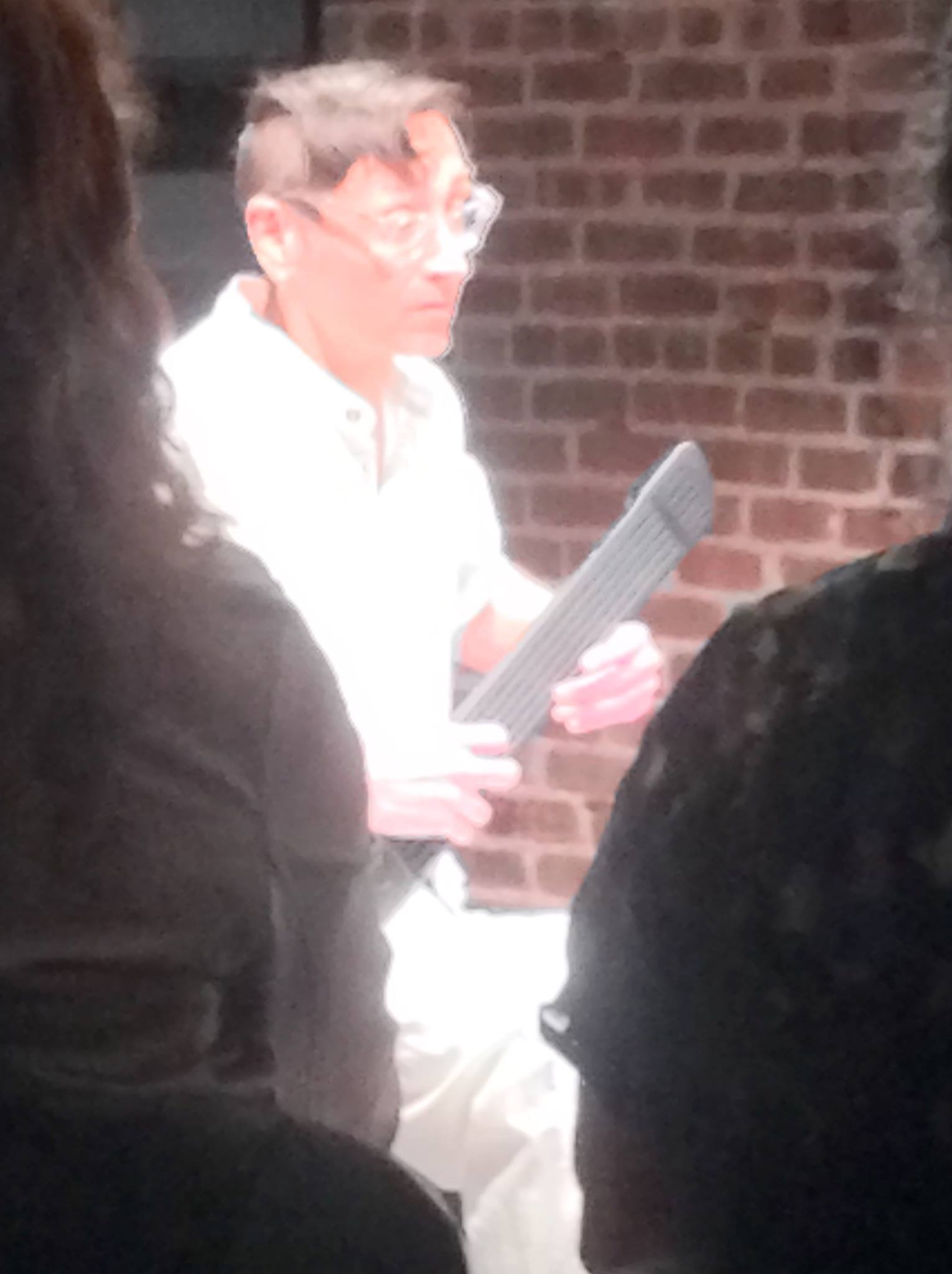
- Chase in 2017 performing his composition "Bhajan" in San Francisco
- Born: Nicholas Frances Chase; July 23, 1966; Roseburg, Oregon, US
- Occupations: composer; musician; illustrator; author
- Musical career
- Genres: contemporary classical; classical; experimental; electronic pop
- Instruments: piano; keyboards; voice; laptop
- Labels: Cold Blue Music; Unit; CAteliers

Nicholas Frances Chase (Nebeil Mahayni; 1966), is an American composer, performer, and author.

Chase received a Bachelor of Arts in German Area Studies from University of Oregon in 1993 and studied music composition at the California Institute of the Arts (CalArts) with Stephen Mosko, Morton Subotnick, Bunita Marcus, and Mary Jane Leach, receiving his Master of Fine Arts in 2000. At CalArts he studied Hindustani Classical Music with Rajeev Taranath and Arabic Classical Music with Dr. Ziad Bunni.

His compositional style has referenced popular music forms such as techno, electronica, ambient, and noise music, and made use of interactive signal processing and electronic sound material with acoustic instrumentation (electroacoustic music). He has written original music for various ensembles including the California EAR Unit, the Long Beach Opera, and the Philadelphia Classical Symphony.

In 2024 Chase published a 219-page book about free improvisation, Passage of Desire: Improvisation and the Human Journey, posthumously co-authored with Susan Allen.

== Performances ==
Chase has performed using a laptop and DJ turntables and is known to integrate video projection into performances. In 2008 he began performing his own compositions for solo piano, giving concerts in Europe and the US.

== Visual work ==
Chase has directed short films, usually with a musical element. In 2008 he created video projections for an event affiliated with the Whitney Biennial. With a background in illustration and design, he has created musical scores that have strong graphical elements and have been recognized as works of visual art. In 2023 Chase published Petunia is a Very Busy Cat, a 54-page illustrated story.

== Awards ==
In 2000, the same year he received his M.F.A., Chase was awarded CalArts' President's Alumni Achievement Award. He was nominated for the Alpert Award in Music in 2003. In 2011 Chase received a Composer Fellowship from Other Minds Festival in San Francisco, the inaugural year of the Composer Fellow program.

== Works ==
- e1>3ktr=Δ (also known as Elektra, 2000) opera for alto singer, flute, DJ, video projectionist
- Sp!t (2000) for flute, bass clarinet, violin, cello, piano, DJ
- Tw!tch (2000) for flute, violin, contrabass
- Rugosa Rose (2001) for solo violin
- OPUS (2002) for flute, clarinet, violin, cello, piano, DJ
- 22: Taker of the Total Chance (2003) for 2 soprano singers, violin, viola, cello, contrabass, 2 pianos
- Woad for Indigo (2004) for solo piano
- 11 Ideas (also known as Dalì's Egg, 2005–2013) opera for 2 narrators, film, piano, DJ, video projection
- Seventh Sense (2005) for solo contrabass with live electronics
- Ouistitis (2007) for viola and cello
- Considering Light (2008) for flute soloist, melodica, violin, cello, piano, kettle drums, toy piano
- Ngoma Lungdundu (Voice That Thunders) (2008) 4-channel pre-recorded media and video projection
- Songs of the Thirsty Sword (2008) for solo piano with 4-channel live electronics and video projection
- Blue Sky Over Buchenwald (2008) electronic music sound track
- Gin Blossoms & Broccoli Boutonnières (2011) for solo flute with live electronics
- Bhajan (also known as Bhajan I-IV 2017) for solo violin and live electronics
- Voluptuous (2012) for solo piano and optional live electronics
- Saida (2013) for solo piano
- Hai•ku (2018) under pseudonym 1=xx_√=<ktºr (Lexx Vektor), electronic music
- Zuòwàng (2023) for solo piano
- Tiny Thunder (2023) for piano four hands

== Discography ==
- Collaborations (2006) STV/Unit Records, UTR4174
- Hai•ku (2008) as 1=xx_√=<ktºr (Lexx Vektor), CAtliers (independent), CAt-018-01
- The Velvet Watt Volume 1: Ngoma Lungundu (2009) CAteliers (independent), CAt-001
- Martinis at the Maybeck (2012) with Susan Allen (musician) and Rus Pearson as NIRUSU III, CAteliers (independent), CAt-003
- Voluptuous: Works for Solo Piano (2014) CAteliers (independent), CAt-006
- Bhajan (2017), Cold Blue Music, CB0046
- Garden Works: Music for Soloists (2022) CAteliers (independent), CAt-011
- Tiny Thunder (2023), Cold Blue Music, CB0064
