= Toni Järvinen =

Finnish footballer (born 1981)

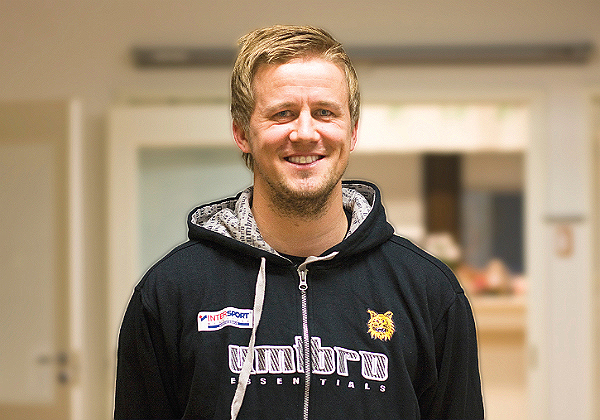

Personal information
- Date of birth: 27 January 1981 (age 45)
- Place of birth: Lahti, Finland
- Height: 1.80 m (5 ft 11 in)
- Positions: Right back; midfielder

Senior career*
Years	Team	Apps	(Gls)
2000–2006	FC Lahti	122	(7)
2007–2010	Tampere United	45	(4)

International career^{‡}
2008	Finland B	1	(0)
- * Club domestic league appearances and goals as of 24 September 2010 ‡ National team caps and goals as of 00:26, 19 June 2009 (UTC)

Toni Järvinen (born 27 January 1981) is a Finnish footballer who last played for Tampere United. He plays either as a midfielder or a side defender. Järvinen's junior team was Kuusysi Lahti and he has also played for FC Lahti in the Finnish premier division Veikkausliiga. As of September 2010 he has played 167 matches and scored 11 goals in the premier division. On 24 September 2010 he announced his retirement from the game because he never recovered from his injuries.
