= Toivo Järvinen =

Finnish farmer and politician (1895–1947)

Johan Toivo Järvinen (29 May 1895 – 24 April 1947) was a Finnish farmer and politician, born in Hartola. He was a member of the Parliament of Finland from 1945 until his death in 1947, representing the Finnish People's Democratic League (SKDL). He was imprisoned for political reasons from 1930 to 1933.
