= Stephen L. Mosko =

Stephen "Lucky" Mosko
- Born: December 7, 1947; Denver, Colorado, U.S.
- Died: December 6, 2005 Green Valley, Los Angeles County, California
- Genres: Contemporary classical, world
- Occupations: Composer, music director, teacher

Stephen L. (Lucky) Mosko (December 7, 1947 - December 6, 2005) was an American composer. His music blended high modernism (including serialism) with world music, and he was an expert in Icelandic folk music. His, "seemingly contradictory," influences include uptown, downtown, and the West Coast school; including John Cage, Milton Babbitt, Elliott Carter, Morton Feldman, and Mel Powell.

Mosko studied with Antonia Brico, Donald Martino, Gustav Meier, Mel Powell, Leonard Stein, and Morton Subotnick.

He was the music director of the San Francisco Contemporary Music Players from 1988 to 1997 and of the Los Angeles Olympic Arts Festival's Contemporary Music Festival in 1984. He was the director of the Ojai Music Festival in 1986 and 1990. He was married to Dorothy Stone, founding flutist of California EAR Unit.

Notable students include composers Ann Millikan and Nicholas Frances Chase.

== Discography ==
Composer

- Indigenous Music (1998), The California EAR Unit
- Composer Portrait Series: Stephen L. Mosko (2000), Southwest Chamber Music

Music director

- For Samuel Beckett by Morton Feldman (1993), San Francisco Contemporary Music Players
- Only: Works for Voice and Instruments by Morton Feldman (1996), Joan La Barbara and the San Francisco Contemporary Music Players
