= Kirk Jarvinen =

American artist / illustrator (born 1967)

- Born: 1967 (age 58–59) Detroit, Michigan
- Area: Penciller

Kirk Jarvinen (born 1967) is an American artist / illustrator best known for his cartoon-style comic book art.

== Early life ==
Kirk Jarvinen was born in 1967 in Detroit, and raised in Michigan.

== Career ==
Jarvinen became a professional comic artist and worked for a number of major publishers including Northstar, Fantagraphics, Malibu, DC Comics and Marvel Comics. He gained attention as penciller for a four issue mini-series story for DC's Aquaman, in collaboration with writer, Peter David. The Aquaman:Time and Tide series was later collected into a trade paperback.

Jarvinen is also credited as the co-creator of the Marvel Comics Hulk character, Lazarus, with Peter David, and a DC Comics Green Lantern character, Torquemada, with Ron Marz.

Other published credits to the Jarvinen name include a series of Golden Books produced by Random House, under The Amazing Spider-Man name.

In 2004 as the penciller, artist for Moonstone Books' comic book adaptation of Kolchak: The Night Stalker, entitled Kolchak: Tales of the Night Stalker. Jarvinen has designed numerous action figures for the Kenner Hasbro.

== Personal life ==
In 2001, Kirk Jarvinen married Pamela Milliron in a Las Vegas wedding ceremony, whose attendants were dressed in comic book attire as the Jack Kirby/Stan Lee character of Thor. They live in Portland, Oregon.
