= Matti Järvinen (ice hockey, born 1984) =

Finnish ice hockey player

- Born: 20 April 1984 (age 41) Pori, Finland
- Height: 5 ft 9 in (175 cm)
- Weight: 168 lb (76 kg; 12 st 0 lb)
- Position: Goaltender
- Caught: Right
- Played for: Ässät; Manglerud Star Ishockey; Vålerenga Ishockey
- NHL draft: Undrafted
- Playing career: 2003–2008

Matti Järvinen (born 20 April 1984) is a Finnish former professional ice hockey goaltender who played for Ässät in the SM-liiga during the 2003–04 season.
