= Christian Bobin =

French author and poet (1951–2022)

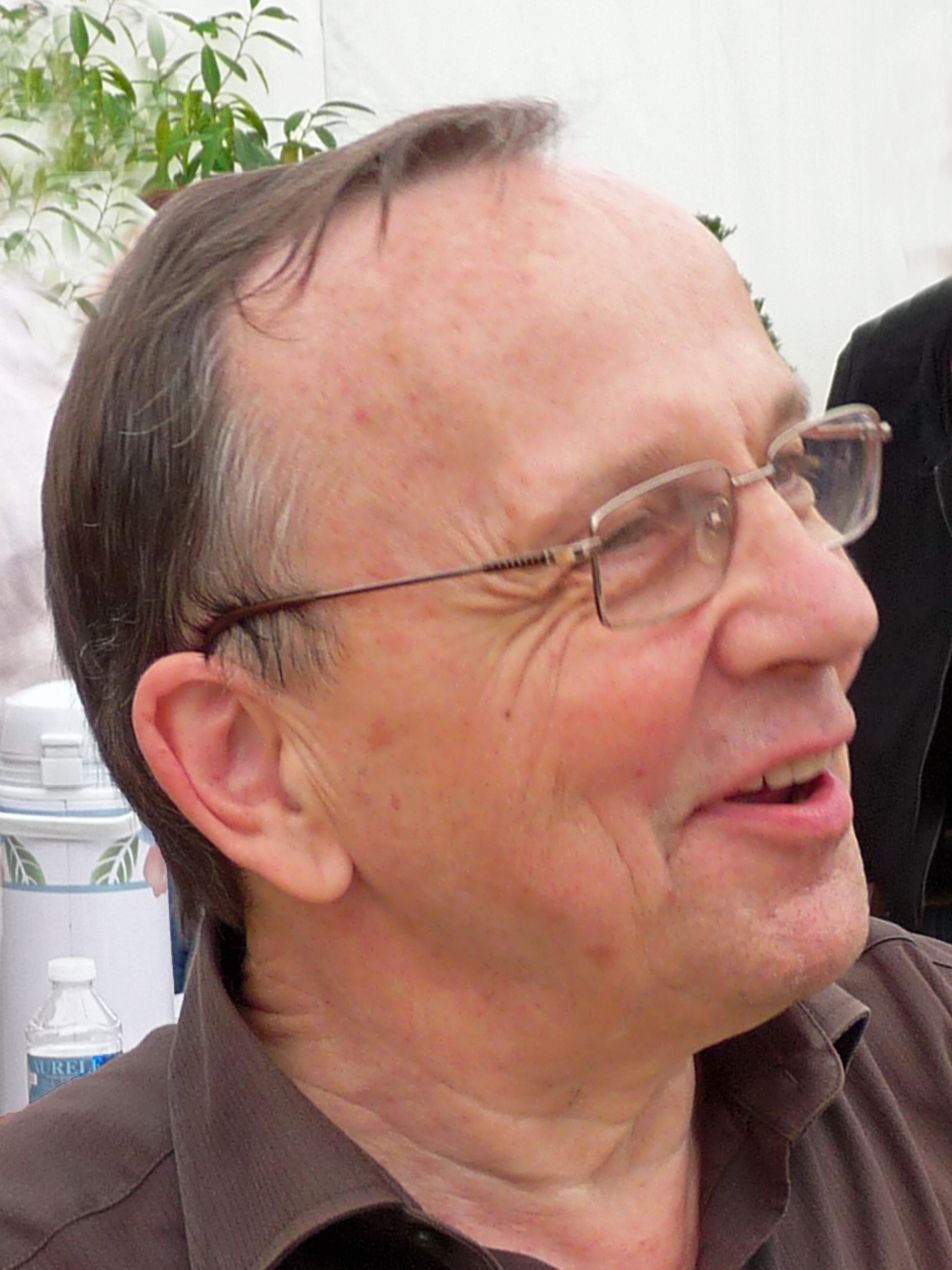
- Bobin in 2011
- Born: 24 April 1951; Le Creusot, Saône-et-Loire, France
- Died: 24 November 2022 (aged 71); Chalon-sur-Saône, France
- Occupations: Essayist; Poet
- Writing career
- Language: French
- Period: 1977–2022
- Genres: Essay, poetry, vignette, Christian works
- Notable work: Essay: The Very Lowly (1992, tr. 1997)

Christian Bobin (24 April 1951 – 24 November 2022) was a French author and poet.

Bobin received the 1993 Prix des Deux Magots for the book Le Très-Bas (translated into English in 1997 by Michael Kohn and published under two titles: The Secret of Francis of Assisi: A Meditation and The Very Lowly).

== Works ==
- Letter Purple (Ed Brandes, 1977)
- Fire Room (Ed Brandes, 1978)
- The kiss of black marble (Ed Brandes, 1984)
- Sovereignty Vacuum (Ed.Fata Morgana, 1985)
- Man of the disaster (Ed Fata Morgana, 1986)
- Lady, king, jack (Ed Brandes, 1987)
- Golden letters (Ed Fata Morgana, 1987)
- The eighth day of the week (Ed Letters Vives, 1988)
- Preface Air loneliness of Gustave Roud Fata Morgana 1988
- The simple magic (Ed Letters Vives, 1989)
- The missing part (Ed. Gallimard, 1989)
- Praise of nothing (Ed Fata Morgana, 1990)
- The peddler (Ed Fata Morgana, 1990)
- The busy life (Ed Fata Morgana, 1990)
- The woman next (Ed. Gallimard, 1990)
- The other face (Ed Letters Vives, 1991)
- The wonder and the dark (Ed. Paroles d'Aube, 1991) - Interviews with Christian Bobin
- A small party dress (Ed. Gallimard, 1991)
- The Very Lowly (Ed. Gallimard, 1992) -- Prix des Deux Magots 1993 Grand Prix of Catholic Literature 1993
- A useless book (Ed Fata Morgana, 1992)
- Isabelle Bruges (Ed. Weather, 1992)
- Heart of Snow (Ed. Theodore Balmoral, 1993)
- The Expulsion of the world (Ed Letters Vives, 1993)
- The Unexpected (Ed. Gallimard, 1994)
- The Exhaustion (Ed. Weather, 1994)
- A few days with them (Ed. Weather, 1994)
- The Walking Man (Ed. Weather, 1995)
- La Folle Allure (Ed. Gallimard, 1995)
- Good for nothing, as his mother (Ed Letters Vives, 1995)
- The More than alive (Ed. Gallimard, 1996)
- Clemence Frog (Ed. Weather, 1996)
- A conference of Helen Cassicadou (Ed. Weather, 1996)
- Gael First, King of the abyss and Mornelongue (Ed. Weather, 1996)
- The day Franklin ate the sun (Ed. Weather, 1996)
- Give me something that would not die (Ed. Gallimard, 1996) - Black and White's Edward Boubat accompanied by texts by Christian Bobin
- Self-Portrait with radiator (Ed. Gallimard, 1997)
- Jay (Ed. Gallimard, 1998)
- The Equilibrist (Ed. Weather, 1998)
- The mere presence (Ed. Weather, 1999)
- Self-Portrait with radiator (Ed. Gallimard, 2000)
- Everyone is busy (Ed. Mercure de France, 1999)
- Resurrecting (Ed. Gallimard, 2001)
- The Light of the World (Ed. Gallimard, 2001)
- The Enchantment and other simple texts (Ed. Gallimard, 2001)
- Words for a farewell (Ed. Albin Michel, 2001)
- Christ the poppies (Ed Letters Vives, 2002)
- Mozart and the rain monitoring A disorder of red petals (Ed Letters Vives, 2002)
- Louise Love (Ed. Gallimard, 2004)
- Prisoner in the cradle (Ed. Mercure de France, 2005)
- A library of clouds (Ed Letters Vives, 2006)
- The White Lady (Ed. Gallimard, 2007)
- The ruins of the sky (Ed. Gallimard, 2009)
