= Ann Millikan =

American composer (born 1963)

Ann E. Millikan (born June 10, 1963) is an American composer.

== Life and career ==
Ann Millikan was born in San Diego County, California. She studied music at San José State University, where she graduated with a BA. She went on to graduate with a MFA from the California Institute of the Arts where she studied with Morton Subotnick, Mel Powell and Stephen Mosko. Afterward, she continued her studies in African music and classical voice.

Millikan composes in several genres, including orchestral, opera, choral and instrumental, and her works have been used for purposes such as installation, theatre and dance. Her compositions have been called "dynamic and diverse."

Millikan's works have been performed internationally and are widely available on recorded media. She currently resides in Minnesota.

== Honors and awards ==
Millikan has received grants and awards from the following:

- 2011 MN State Arts Board Artist Initiative
- 2010 McKnight Composer Fellowship
- California Arts Council
- American Music Center
- ASCAP awards
- American Composers Forum
- Meet The Composer
- Argosy Foundation Contemporary Music Fund
- Jerome Foundation
- Zellerbach Family Fund
- Berkeley Civic Arts Program
- Waging Peace Through Singing (Highest Honors)

== Works ==
Selected works include:

Orchestra

- Trilhas de Sombra
- Ballad Nocturne
- Landing Inside the Inside of an Animal
- Red Migration for orchestra

Chamber

- Thunder Woman
- Kuiper Belt Wamfle
- The Woodcarver & The Blacksmith
- Cantando para a Onça
- Choro do Zeitgeist
- Red Migration
- 221B Baker Street
- Trens Coloridos para Gabriela
- Three Reflections
- K'uei: A SYZYGY

Theater and dance

- From The Bottom Drawer
- The Color of Blood: Praising the Moon We Are, Part I
- The Medicine of the Spiral
- K'uei: A SYZYGY

Strings

- From the Bottom Drawer
- Choro do Miro
- Metal Shop 302

Woodwinds

- House of Mirrors I
- House of Mirrors II
- Calendula
- Suite for Woodwinds Quartet

Vocal

- Water From Your Spring
- The Medicine of the Spiral II: Quartet Improvisations
- My Island
- Abstrações

Choral

- grandmother walks, mist rises
- Choro
- Advent Music
- O Sapientia – O Wisdom
- The One Who Is Coming...
- La Vieja
- Song of Remembrance
- Psalm 78: 14, 15, 17–19, 23-25
- Tantum ergo Sacramentum
- Ave Maria
- I Woman

Opera

- Swede Hollow, music and libretto by Ann Millikan
