= Kristian Järvinen =

Finnish ice hockey player

- Born: July 29, 1992 (age 32); Turku, Finland
- Height: 5 ft 11 in (180 cm)
- Weight: 170 lb (77 kg; 12 st 2 lb)
- Position: Goaltender
- Shoots: Left
- Mestis team Former teams: TUTO Hockey; TPS; HPK
- NHL draft: Undrafted
- Playing career: 2012–present

Kristian Järvinen (born July 29, 1992) is a Finnish professional ice hockey goaltender. He is currently playing for TUTO Hockey of the Finnish Mestis.

Kristian Järvinen made his Liiga debut playing with TPS during the 2014-15 Liiga season.
