= Roman Stolyar =

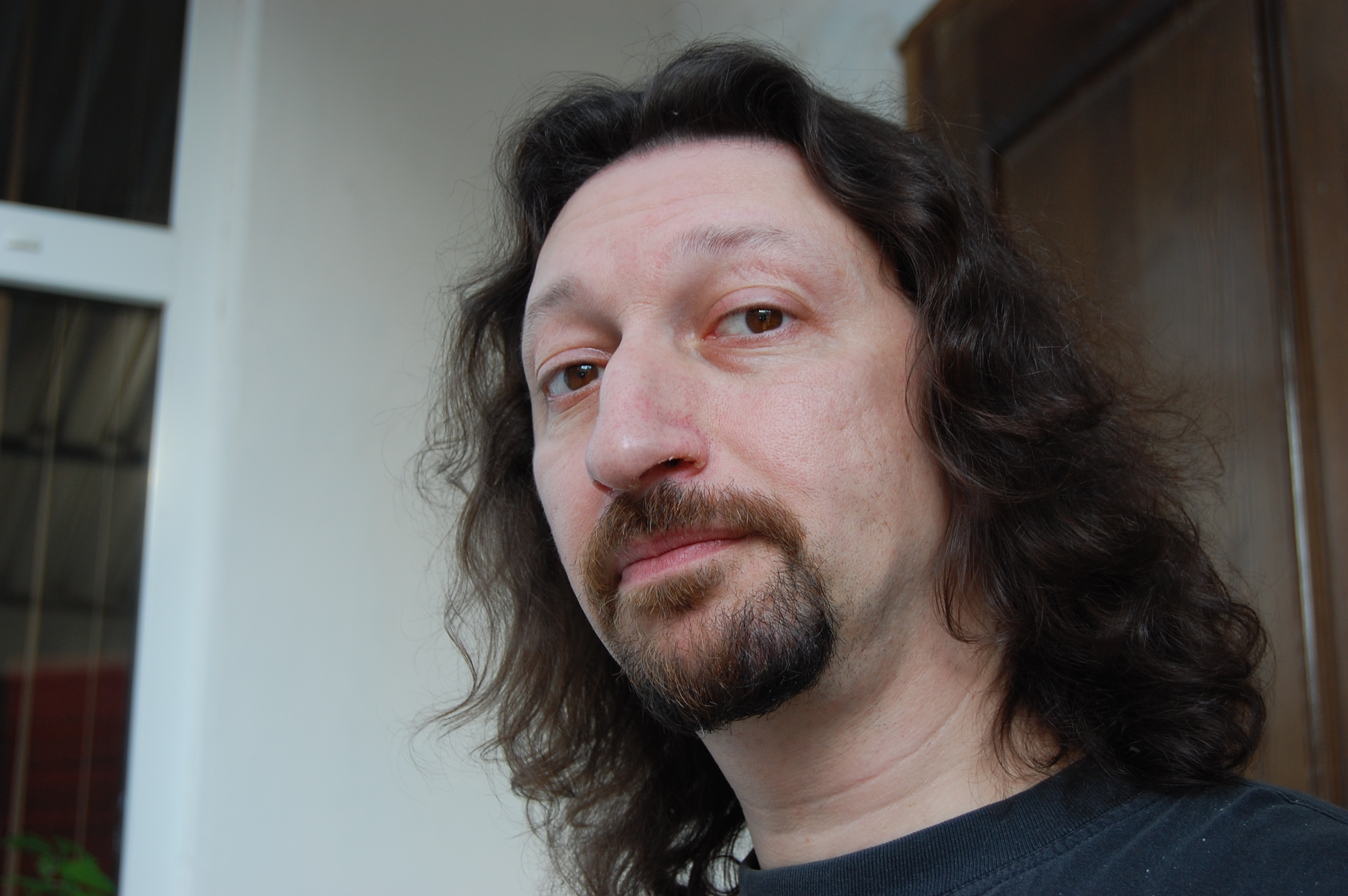

Background information
- Born: Roman Solomonovich Stolyar; December 6, 1967 (age 58)
- Origin: Novosibirsk, Russia
- Genres: Free improvisation, Jazz, Free jazz, Art music
- Occupations: Composer, improviser
- Instruments: Piano, keyboards, flutes
- Website: rstmusic.narod.ru

Roman Stolyar (born December 6, 1967) is a Russian composer, piano improviser and educator.

== Career ==
Born in Novosibirsk, Siberia, in a family of engineers, Stolyar graduated from Novosibirsk College of Music as a jazz pianist and from Novosibirsk State Concervatoire as a composer of contemporary and electronic music.

As an improviser, he has collaborated with Dominic Duval, William Parker, Vinny Golia, Stephen Nachmanovitch, Marco Eneidi, Weasel Walter, Susan Allen, Tanya Kalmanovitch, Oliver Lake, Assif Tsahar, Glen Hall, Thomas Buckner, Martin Kuchen, Ed Sarath, Jin Hi Kim, Ilia Belorukov, Sergey Letov and others.

His music has been released on labels Cadence Jazz, Electroshock Records, SoLyd, Ayler Records, NewFolder2, Creative Sources, Bomba Piter, and Ermatell Records.

Living in Novosibirsk, he was working as an educator at Novosibirsk College of Music and as a music director of Novosibirsk State Theatre "Globe". His book Modern Improvisation: A Practical Guide for Piano was published in Russia in 2010. In 2018 he moved in Saint Petersburg where he worked in Boris Tischenko Music College and continued composing music for theater shows, playing improv concerts and giving lectures and workshops on theory and history of free improvisation.

When the 2022 Russian invasion of Ukraine started, Roman Stolyar expressed his protests against war and growing repression in Russia in a number of interviews given to European mass media. He finally left Russia in February 2023 and is currently living and working in Berlin, Germany, collaborating with a number of Berlin-based musicians– Edith Steyer, Meinrad Kneer, Sam Hall, Vincent Laju, Lina Allemano, Anna Kaluza, Johannes von Wrochem and many others. He is also a member of IDENTITIES Quintet which unites improvisers of various nations living in Berlin.

He is a member of the Russian Composers Union and member of the Advisory Council of International Society for Improvised Music.

== Discography ==
- Roman Stolyar - SAVJEST, TO FOLLOW (2022, Bomba Piter)
- Roman Stolyar, Andrey Razin - BALLET SCENES FOR TWO PIANOS (2021, Bomba Piter)
- Michaela Steinhauer, Alexey Kruglov, Roman Stolyar - CHANGES & CHOICES (2021, independent release)
- Hung Mung & Roman Stolyar - ADVERCITY YIELDS FLAIR (2020, Discordian Records)
- Nick Rubanov, Alexander Ragazanov, Roman Stolyar - RURARO (2020, Bomba Piter)
- Raphael Sudan, Roman Stolyar - RESTLESS (2017, Ermatell)
- Michaela Steinhauer, Alexey Kruglov, Roman Stolyar – TALKS AROUND MIDNIGHT (2016, Fancy Music)
- VocColors Quartet, Alexey Kruglov, Roman Stolyar, Andrey Razin, Oleg Yudanov – RUSSIAN AFFAIRS (2016, ArtBeat)
- Roman Stolyar, Alexye Nadzharov, Alexei Chichilin – NACHISTO (2016, Creative Sources)
- Roman Stolyar - THE BOSTON CASE (2014, FancyMusic)
- Glen Hall, Roman Stolyar, Vladimir Luchansky, Vladimir Dranitsa, Sergey Belichenko - LIVE IN SIBERIA (2014, Tarsier Records)
- Alexey Kruglov, Roman Stolyar, Vladimir Dranitsa, Sergey Belichenko - STRUCTURE #54 (2014, FancyMusic)
- Roman Stolyar, Vladimir Luchansky - DUETS (2013, FancyMusic)
- Roman Stolyar, Ed Sarath - AMAZING BLUE (2012, Ermatell)
- Roman Stolyar, Susan Allen — TOGETHER (2011, independent release)
- Roman Stolyar, Dominic Duval — PARK WEST SUITE (2011, Cadence Jazz)
- Roman Stolyar, Alexey Lapin — DOUBLE SONATA (2011, SoLyd)
- Sergey Mikhaylenko & XYZ Quartet — TRUMP CARD (2011, Ermatell/Jazzosophia)
- Lenny Sendersky, Roman Stolyar — EXTREME POINTS (2010, NewFolder2)
- Roman Stolyar — MISSA APOCRYPH (2010, Electroshock)
- Ilia Belorukov, Roman Stolyar, Andrey Popovsky, Alexander Funtikov — DOTS & LINES (2007, Ermatell)
- New Generation Quartet — DANCES (2007, Ayler)
- Susan Allen, Roman Stolyar, Sergey Belichenko — TRIALOG (2005, Ermatell)
- Roman Stolyar — STRAIGHT AND STRANGE (2003, Ermatell)
- Roman Stolyar — CREDO (2003, Electroshock)
- Denmark's Intuitive Music Conference — SOUND SCAPES (2002, Ermatell)
- New Generation Quartet — JOURNAL OF JAZZ IMMUNOLOGY (1996, Ermatell)
