= Robert Stallman =

American classical flautist (1946–2019)

Robert Stallman (1946–2019) was an American classical flutist, arranger, and music educator. He premiered several works by contemporary composers including Karel Husa, William Thomas McKinley, and Burr Van Nostrand, and was the first to record works by several others including John Harbison's Die Kuerze. In the 1990s, he recorded six albums of flute sonatas and concertos for the VAI label.

== Biography ==
Stallman was born on June 12, 1946. In 1968, he obtained his bachelor's degree from the New England Conservatory of Music, where he was mentored by James Papputsakis. He completed two degrees and was also awarded the school's top prize, the Chadwick Medal. After graduation, he became a Fulbright Scholar and studied at the Conservatoire de Paris under Jean-Pierre Rampal, Alain Marion, and Gaston Crunelle.
