= Teet Järvi =

Estonian cellist (1958–2025)

Teet Järvi (22 April 1958 – 18 June 2025) was an Estonian cellist.

== Early life and career ==
Järvi graduated from Tallinn Music High School, studying under Laine Leichter, and from the Tallinn State Conservatoire (1981), studying in the cello class of Peeter Paemurru. He received further training in Moscow with Natalia Shahhovskaja, Mikhail Homitser and Ivan Monighetti.

In 1974, Järvi won First Prize at the International Cello Competition in Czechoslovakia; he was also awarded First Prize at the National (1981) and Baltic competition (1976).

Between 1982 and 1990, Järvi worked as principal cellist in the Estonian National Symphony Orchestra. He performed as a soloist with numerous orchestras, gave concerts with the Tallinn String Quartet and Baltic Trio in many European countries and the United States, and gave solo recitals in several cities in the former Soviet Union and abroad.

As of 1993, Järvi was working in Finland: he played with the Lahti Symphony Orchestra and FINEST string quartet and taught cello at the Lahti Conservatoire.

== Personal life and death ==
His father was conductor Vallo Järvi; his uncle is Neeme Järvi and his wife was pianist Mari Järvi. The couple had five children, all of them musicians.

- Marius Järvi cellist
- Miina Järvi violinist
- Mihkel Järvi pianist
- Madis Järvi violinist/composer
- Martin Järvi violinist

Together, they form the ensemble Järvi Instrumentalists.

Järvi died on 18 June 2025, at the age of 67.
