= Mel Powell =

American composer

- Born: Melvin Epstein; February 12, 1923; The Bronx, New York City
- Died: April 24, 1998 (aged 75); Sherman Oaks, California, U.S.
- Occupations: Composer, music educator, pianist
- Years active: 1939–1998
- Spouse: Martha Scott (m. 1946)
- Children: 2

Mel Powell (born Melvin Epstein) (February 12, 1923 – April 24, 1998) was an American Pulitzer Prize-winning composer, and the founding dean of the music department at the California Institute of the Arts. He served as a music educator for over 40 years, first at Mannes College of Music and Queens College, then Yale University, and finally at CalArts. During his early career he worked as a jazz pianist. His classic Big Band compositions include "Mission to Moscow", "My Guy's Come Back", "Clarinade", "The Earl", and "Bubble Bath".

== Early life ==
Mel Powell was born Melvin D. Epstein on February 12, 1923, in The Bronx, New York City, the second of Russian Jewish parents Milton Epstein and Mildred (Mollie) Mark Epstein's three children. He began playing piano at age four, taking lessons from, among others, Nadia Reisenberg. A passionate baseball fan, his home was within sight of Yankee Stadium. A hand injury while playing baseball as a boy, however, convinced him to pursue music instead of sports as a career. Powell dreamed of life as a concert pianist until his older brother took him to see jazz pianist Teddy Wilson play, and later to a concert featuring Benny Goodman. In a 1987 interview with The New Yorker magazine Powell said "I had never heard anything as ecstatic as this music", prompting a shift from classical to jazz piano. By the age of 14 Powell was performing jazz professionally around New York City. As early as 1939, he was working with Bobby Hackett, George Brunies, and Zutty Singleton, as well as writing arrangements for Earl Hines. He changed his last name from Epstein to Powell in 1941 shortly before joining Benny Goodman's band.

== Career ==
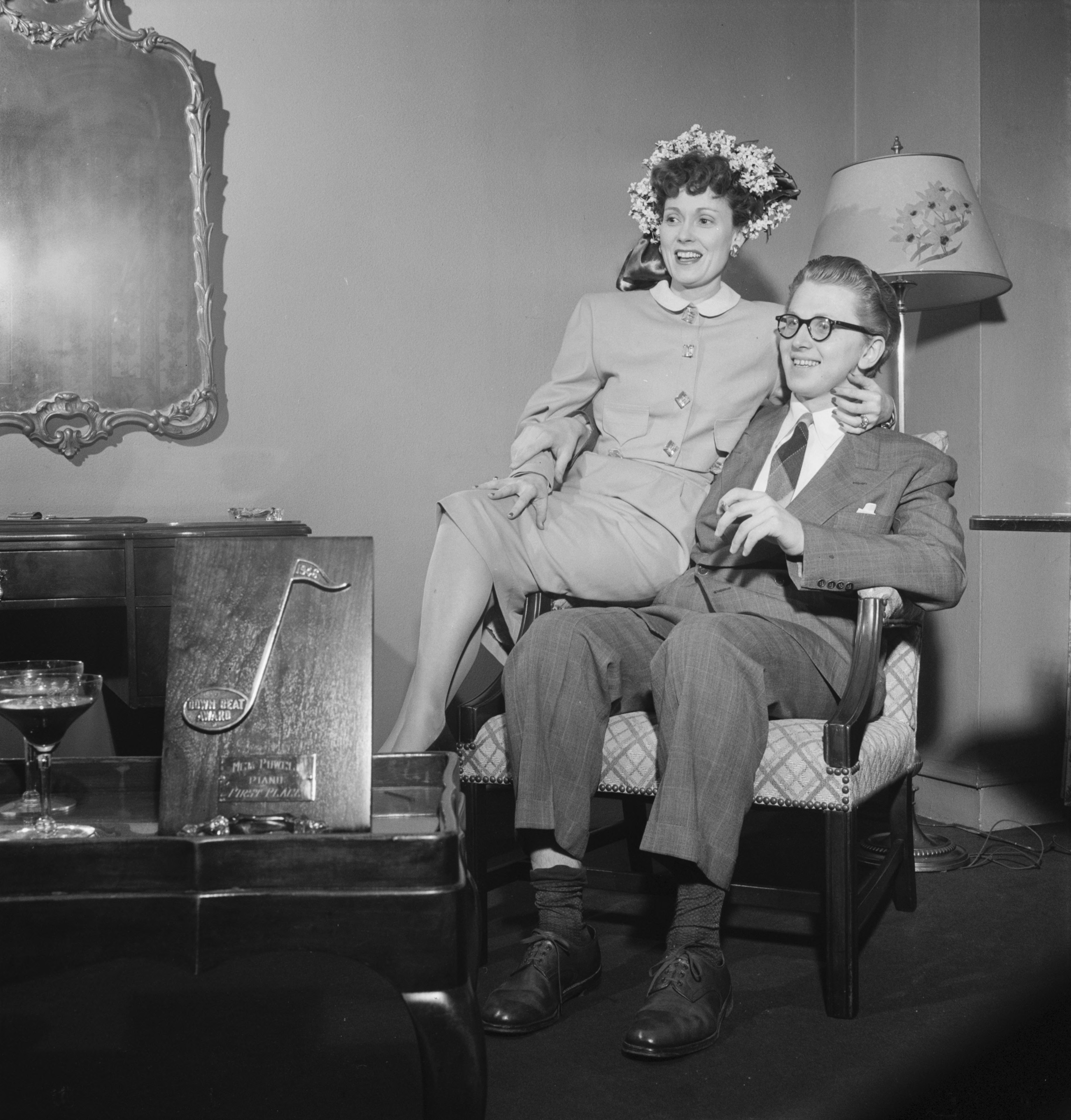
Powell and actress wife Martha Scott at home in 1947. An award to Powell from DownBeat magazine rests on the table.

Powell's style was rooted in the stride style that was the direct precursor to swing piano. One composition from his Goodman years, The Earl, is perhaps his best known from that time. The song—dedicated to Earl "Fatha" Hines, one of Powell's piano heroes—was recorded without a drummer. After nearly two years with Goodman, Powell played briefly with the CBS radio band under director Raymond Scott. During World War II, Powell was drafted into the U.S. Army, but fought his battles from a piano stool, having been assigned to Glenn Miller's Army Air Force Band from 1943 to 1945.

Near the war's end, Powell was stationed in Paris, where he played with Django Reinhardt, and then returned for a brief stint in Goodman's band again after being discharged from the military. In the mid-to-late 1940s, Powell moved to Hollywood and ventured into providing music for movies and cartoons, such as the Tom and Jerry shorts. He played himself in the movie A Song Is Born (1948), appearing along with many other famous jazz players, including Louis Armstrong, Tommy Dorsey and Benny Goodman. It was during his time in Hollywood that he met and married actress Martha Scott.

Shortly thereafter, Powell developed muscular dystrophy. He was reliant on a wheelchair for some time, then walked with aid of a cane. The illness effectively ended his ability to work as a traveling musician again with Goodman or other bands, prompting him to devote himself to composition rather than performance. In 1948 he enrolled at the Yale School of Music, where he studied with German composer and music theorist Paul Hindemith and received a B.M. degree in 1952. In 1954, he recorded the jazz album Thigamigig, including a piano/trumpet/drums track that was selected by Art Clokey for his claymation short Gumbasia in 1955. Also in 1954, he appeared with Benny Goodman in New York at Basin Street for a three-week engagement.

=== Changing styles, careers ===
At first sticking to neoclassical styles of composition, Powell increasingly explored atonality, or "non-tonal" music as he called it, as well as the serialism advocated by Austrian composer Arnold Schoenberg. After receiving his degree, Powell embarked on a career as a music educator, first at Mannes College of Music and Queens College in his native New York City, then returning to Yale in 1958, succeeding Hindemith as chair of the composition faculty and director of one of the nation's first electronic music studios. Powell composed several electronic pieces in the 1960s, some of which were performed at the Electric Circus in New York's East Village, a venue that also saw performances by groundbreaking rock music acts like the Velvet Underground and the Grateful Dead. But Powell did not completely turn his back on jazz. While teaching in the 1950s, he also played piano and recorded music with Benny Goodman again, as well as on his own.

Powell composed for orchestra, chorus, voice, and chamber ensemble throughout the 1960s, 1970s, and 1980s. In 1969, he returned to California to serve as founding dean of the School of Music of the California Institute of the Arts in Valencia. After serving as Provost of the institute from 1972 to 1976, he was appointed the Roy O. Disney Professor of Music, and taught at the Institute until shortly before his death. Notable students include the composers Ann Millikan and Anthony Brandt. See: List of music students by teacher: N to Q#Mel Powell.

== Later years ==
In 1987, Powell joined other musicians for a jazz festival on the cruise ship SS Norway, playing alongside Benny Carter, Howard Alden, Milt Hinton, Louie Bellson and others. One performance has been documented on the CD The Return of Mel Powell (Chiaroscuro Records). The recording includes 20 minutes of Powell discussing his life and his reasons for leaving jazz. In an interview with The New Yorker magazine jazz critic Whitney Balliett, Powell said: "I have decided that when I retire I will think through my decision to leave jazz – with the help of Freud and Jung. At the moment, I suspect it was this: I had done what I felt I had to do in jazz. I had decided it did not hold the deepest interest for me musically. And I had decided that it was a young man's music, even a black music. Also, the endless repetition of material in the Goodman band – playing the same tunes day after day and night after night – got to me. That repetition tended to kill spontaneity, which is the heart of jazz and which can give a lifetime's nourishment."

=== Pulitzer Prize ===
In 1990, Powell received his highest career achievement, the Pulitzer Prize for Music, for his work Duplicates: A Concerto for Two Pianos and Orchestra. In a Los Angeles Times interview, Powell expressed complete surprise: "Being out here on the coast, far away from the whole Eastern establishment to which the Pulitzer is connected – that made me a remote prospect. I just didn't expect it." In an interview with The New York Times, Powell related the story of how Duplicates came from his service in World War II and an anecdote he heard in Paris about Claude Debussy's search for perfect music. That, Powell, stated was his goal for Duplicates. The work, commissioned in 1987 for the Los Angeles Philharmonic by music patron Betty Freeman, took Powell more than two years to complete. It was made even more difficult as his muscular dystrophy, previously affecting only his legs, began to afflict his arms and thus his ability to play the piano.

Besides the Pulitzer, Powell's awards and honors include the Creative Arts Medal from Brandeis University, a Guggenheim Fellowship, an honorary life membership in the Arnold Schoenberg Institute, a commission from the Koussevitzky Music Foundation for the Library of Congress, and a National Institute of Arts and Letters grant.

== Death ==
Gravesite of Mel Powell and wife Martha Scott in Jamesport, Missouri

Powell died at his home in Sherman Oaks, California, on April 24, 1998, from liver cancer. He was 75 years old. Powell was survived by his wife, actress Martha Scott, two daughters and a stepson. He was buried in the Masonic Cemetery in his wife's hometown of Jamesport, Missouri.

== Quotes ==
- On his days in big band/swing music: "It's really so long ago, one ought to be able to invoke a statute of limitations. I played with Benny Goodman for two years, and I've been composing for 40. At the time, swing music, big-band music and Benny Goodman in particular were so boundlessly popular that people who made room for it in their lives have never forgotten it. So I get calls from people who are in a kind of time warp, who ask me about this period of my life as though it were the present. But I've moved on to other things."
- "The musician's business is structure...The musician...is...therefore drawn to a profound science of structure. Looking closely at music itself, he is likely to ask: "What changes? When? By how much?"...he is...able to feel at home where logicians exhibit techniques for "isolating relevant structure."
- "It is true that the music I traffic in, along with Milton Babbitt, Elliott Carter and others, has never gained a great popularity. But that was true of the so-called difficult music of earlier centuries, too. And I must say that I have noticed, as we have held our ground, that there has been a softening of response. There are now those who are beginning to find expressive beauty in a music that was at first rejected entirely."
