= Forms of Ghanaian highlife =

Ghanaian highlife emerged in the 1980s as a mixture of West African rhythms from Europe by Black people from south and North America. There were three forms of Ghanaian highlife:

- Adaha
- Fanti Osibisaaba
- palm-wine music.

== Early years ==
The regimental bands of 6,000 West Indian soldiers stationed at the Cape Coast Castle and Elmina Castle by the British colonial administration left a legacy. The legacy was the Adaha brass band that played in the Fanti Coast.

The first form Adaha music was spreading throughout southern Ghana and other parts. The Konkoma also called Konkomba, was a drum and voice that developed and spread in 1930 as Adaha evolved. This version spread because in the small towns and villages, expensive brass instruments could not be afforded by the people.

The Fanti Osibisaaba music used together local percussion instruments together with guitars and the accordions of sailors of the Kru sailors of Liberia. The Fanti Osibisaaba pioneered Africanised cross-fingering guitar techniques which developed to be Ghanaian Highlife, Maringa of Sierra Leone, the Juju music of western Nigeria and "dry" music of Central Africa.

Later in 1930, in rural Ghana, there was a fusion with traditional Akan "seprewa" or harp-lute. This resulted in the "odonson", Akan "blues" or "palm-wine music"; roots style highlife.

== Guitar 1920-1940 ==
- Jacob Sam (Kwame Asare)
- Mireku
- Appiah Adjekum

=== Western record companies ===
Zonophone, Columbia, Odeon and His Master's Voice, based in Ghana.

== Highlife ==
The combination of high-class music with local tunes of the street introduced a different type of music – the highlife as known today. Excelsoir Orchestra and Jazz Kings of Accra was formed in 1914. Early on, the less affluent claimed to this music was played for the affluent of society by large ballroom and ragtime dance orchestras. In the 1950s, theater groups travelled around the country with the "concert party' shows that used highlife guitar bands as part of their act.

EK Nyame was one of the people whose records became popular in eastern Nigeria.Cape Coast Sugar Babies were of the first highlife orchestras who in 1937 was remembered for their tour in Nigeria. The Tempos band, led by the Ga trumpeter ET Mensah, incorporated Afro-Cuban percussion played by the drummer Guy Warren, known as Kofi Ghanaba.

Highlife has evolved into "gospel highlife", "techno" like "burgher highlife" forms and "hip-life", a vernacular rap, hip hop and highlife combination.
