= Dead Men Don't Smoke Marijuana =

Studio album by S. E. Rogie
- Released: 16 May 1994
- Recorded: September 1993; January 1994
- Studio: Real World Studios, Box, Wiltshire
- Genre: Palm-wine; highlife; folk
- Length: 42:54
- Label: RealWorld; CEMA
- Producer: Tchad Blake

S. E. Rogie chronology
The New Sounds of S.E.ROGIE (1991)	Dead Men Don't Smoke Marijuana (1994)

Dead Men Don't Smoke Marijuana is the final album by Sierra Leonean highlife and palm-wine musician S. E. Rogie, recorded at Real World Studios, Wiltshire, England, in 1993–94 and released in May 1994 by Real World Records. Production was carried out by American producer Tchad Blake, who worked in an intimate fashion. In addition to Rogie's three-piece backing band, the album also features the English double bassist Danny Thompson and guitarist Alfred Bannerman. The album is characteristic of Rogie's palm-wine material, with his syncopated folk songs, finger-picked acoustic guitar playing style, sulky baritone vocals, often in the Krio language, and African call-and-response vocals.

Beyond the album's central West African musical style, further influences are provided by Thompson's double bass, blues guitar licks, and African-inflected inspiration from Rogie's early influence, American yodeller Jimmie Rodgers. The songs on the album were all written by Rogie, who believed he subconsciously created songs out of catchy expressions he had thought of. The album was released one month before Rogie's death in June 1994, and received positive reviews from music critics, who complimented the album's soothing, mellow sound. The album has been considered by some writers and authors to be among the finest examples of palm-wine music.

== Background and recording ==
Sooliman Ernest Rogie was born in 1926 in the town of Fonikoh, Pujehun District in southern Province Sierra Leone, and later became one of the country's most popular performers, achieving a hit single with "My Lovely Elizabeth". His musical style was rooted in the country's highlife music, but, having been influenced by country music as a child, he combined western pop and folk influences with his smooth baritone vocals and subtle, finger-picked, acoustic guitar-played melodies to create his take on palm wine music, which he named in reference to the alcoholic drink made using the naturally fermented fap from palm trees in Sierra Leone. Rogie has been credited with bringing the genre to an international audience. Seeking to escape his politically troubled country, he emigrated to England in 1973, creating the record label Rogiephone, who issued his first album, African Lady, in 1975, although in 1988, he moved back to his native Sierra Leone.

Dead Men Don't Smoke Marijuana was Rogie's final album, and was recorded for the British world music record label Real World Records. Given that the label is affiliated with the world music-celebrating WOMAD arts festival, Dead Men Don't Smoke Marijuana and the label's other albums bear the credit "A WOMAD Production." The album was produced by Tchad Blake, whose production style on the album was described by The Beat as intimate and profoundly felt, transcending "mere record production" and instead resembling "a more sentient form of portraiture." The album features new collaborators Danny Thompson on double bass and Alfred Bannerman on lead guitar in addition to Rogie's band, who include keyboardist Simon Clarke, guitarist and backing vocalist Emile Oogo, and Zozo Shuaibu, who contributes electric bass, percussion and backing vocals.

Recording for the album began at Real World Studios, Box, Wiltshire, England, throughout September 1993. He then took a break from recording throughout the rest of 1993, returning to Sierra Leone to play a series of benefit concerts whose money raised was used to purchase food and medicine for Sierra Leoneans that had been dislocated by the rebel war which prevailed the Eastern and southern provinces. It was while in Sierra Leone that he was diagnosed with a serious heart problem. In early January 1994, he returned to London, and after taking a short rest, he returned to Real World to record the remainder of the album throughout that month. On 16 February 1994, shortly after the album's recording but prior to its release, Rogie underwent successful heart bypass surgery.

== Music and lyrics ==
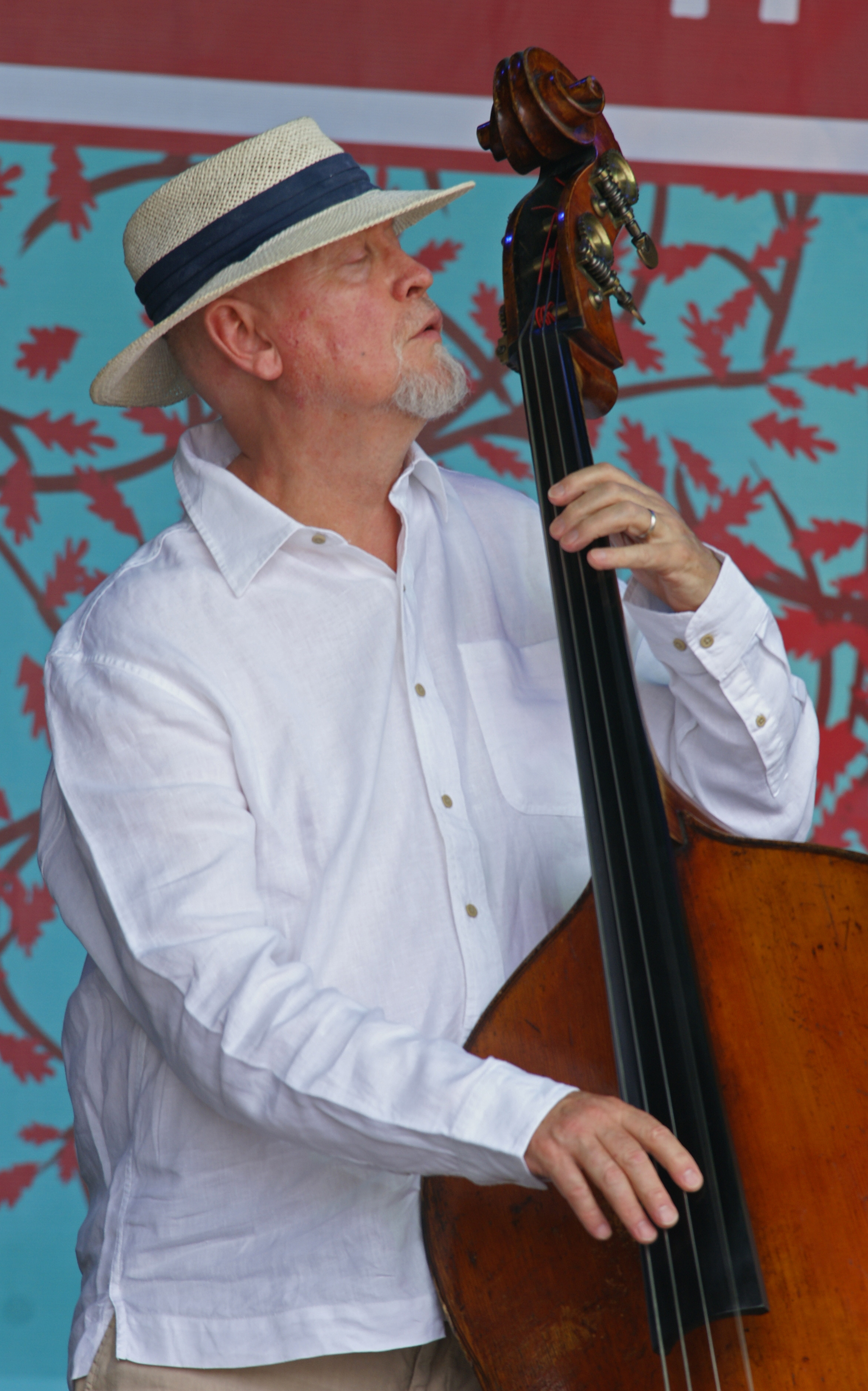
Danny Thompson plays double bass on the album.

Dead Men Don't Smoke Marijuana contains "sweet," syncopated folk songs in Rogie's distinctive palm-wine musical style. The record is dominated by his acoustic guitar work and singing but also backed up with the subtle percussion, double bass and keyboard work. Bret Love of AllMusic noted the atmospheric feel to the music and described the album's musical style as a fusion between the "back-porch vibe" of rustic blues, the laidback rhythms of reggae and the devotional style of Ladysmith Black Mambazo. Rogie's gentle acoustic guitar playing is in a rolling, picking style, and possesses a roots-tinged folk blues feel. While the album exudes a West African musical style, it also boasts a wider range of influences due to the rolling guitar work, the "loamy bottom" of Thompson's folk double bass, as well as guitar licks taken from iconic blues musicians such as John Lee Hooker.

Rogie wrote all of the songs on Dead Men Don't Smoke Marijuana. According to West Africa magazine, Rogie explained that the songwriting "was done in his head. The songs formed there in the dark, like crystals." Rogie explained: "I hear a catchy expression and I pass it on to my sub-conscious and say: 'I want a song out of this.' I believe everything useful comes from there, the subconscious mind. It is the creative power. It creates the songs, passes it back to me and says: 'Hey you, take it out. Go use it!'" The songs are melodically simple and sung by Rogie in a soothing baritone vocal style, often in the Krio language. The songs also feature call-and-response vocals, a characteristic traditional to African music.

The songs frequently reveal the influence of American rhythmic yodeler Jimmie Rodgers, Rogie's earliest musical hero, although the influence is presented on the album in an African-inflected style. The songs on the album are said to be stylistically similar, relying on the same musical theme. The first three minutes of the title track "Dieman Noba Smoke Tafee (Dead Men Don't Smoke Marijuana)" consist of African guitar lines "curling around each other" before Rogie begins singing.

== Release ==
Dead Men Don't Smoke Marijuana was released on 16 May 1994 by Real World Records in the United Kingdom. Tony Stiles designed the album packaging with consultancy from Assorted Images and art direction from Michael Coulson. The packaging is consistent with other Real World albums in that it follows Garry Mouat's identity concept for the label. Three days after the album's release, Rogie began a tour of Germany. Against the medical advice of his heart bypass surgeons, he travelled to perform in Russia, where he lost consciousness while performing onstage. He died at the age of 68 in June 1994, and was survived by his wife, two daughters and a son. While writing about the album shortly after Rogie's death, West Africa wrote that the performer "is ranked alongside other Sierra Leonean icons of music and culture such as Ebezener Calender, Ali Ganda, Dele Charlie, Salami Coker and Dr Oloh."

== Critical reception ==
Professional ratings
Review scores
Source	Rating
Allmusic	4.5/5 stars
Entertainment Weekly	A

Dead Men Don't Smoke Marijuana received critical acclaim; Ty Burr of Entertainment Weekly, writing shortly after Rogie's death, called the album "as mellow a monument as the man himself" and wrote Rogie's guitar style "has the lulling pulse one associates with a fine afternoon buzz." Jazz Times wrote that the album possesses "[a] softly jubilant sound [that] rises up," and noted that Rogie "wraps his baritone voice around sweet, syncopated folk songs in a style described with the term 'palm wine'." Bret Love of AllMusic called the album "a sweet, stirring testament to an undeservedly little-known talent" which he hoped would immortalise Rogie following his death. He praised the album's "deceptively simple charms" and complimented the "atmospheric, carefree feel of the tunes" which he felt evoked "images of relaxing times on breezy beaches watching lush, tropical sunsets."

World Music: The Rough Guide calls Dead Men Don't Smoke Marijuana "a delicious piece of music-cake – so long as you like his one tune, the basis of nearly all the tracks." In The Rough Guide to World Music: Africa & Middle East, Simon Broughton and Mark Ellingham write that the album captures the "beauty of palmwine music" via its simplicity, and feel the album exudes "the same quiet thoughtfulness as its predecessors." They conclude that the album is "[h]ighly enjoyable, as long as you don't mind the variations on what is basically the same theme." The authors of the Bradt Travel Guides book Sierra Leone felt the album's gentle guitar playing and melodies contributed to a "joyful, sultry listen." In his book Afropop!: An Illustrated Guide to Contemporary African Music, writer Jack Vartoogian listed the album among Rogie's "fine recordings of his easy, delightful songs."

In the 2003 book The Cambridge Companion to the Guitar, the album is listed among examples of "African reinvention of the guitar" and is described as a "fine-example" of palm-wine and highlife music. In Banning Eyre's book Africa: Your Passport to a New World of Music, the album is listed as the sole palm wine album to help readers "expand [their] understanding of African guitar styles." Panda Bear of Animal Collective is a fan of the album, calling it "ripping." He was gifted the album by Eric Copeland of Black Dice, and in turn showed it to Ariel Pink: "I remember playing it for Ariel Pink when I was on tour with him, and he said, 'This is what you guys sound like.' I was like, 'Thanks!'" In 2011, Rolling Stone ranked the album's title track at number 13 in their list of "The 15 Greatest Stoner Songs". Adrian Sherwood sampled the title track on his song "Dead Men Smoking" from the album Never Trust a Hippy (2003).

== Track listing ==
All tracks by S. E. Rogie

1. "Kpindigbee (Morning, Noon, and Night)" – 4:11
2. "A Time In My Life" – 3:27
3. "Nor Weigh Me Lek Dat (Woman To Woman)" – 4:04
4. "Jaimgba Tutu (The Joy of Success)" – 2:38
5. "Koneh Pelawoe (Please Open Your Heart)" – 5:04
6. "Jojo Yalahjo (I Lost My Wife)" – 4:43
7. "Nyalomei Luange (Love Me My Love)" – 2:54
8. "African Gospel" – 4:20
9. "Nyalimagotee (The Cornerstone Of My Heart)" – 4:49
10. "Dieman Noba Smoke Tafee (Dead Men Don't Smoke Marijuana)" – 6:38

== Personnel ==
- Alfred Bannerman – Guitar
- Tchad Blake – Producer, Engineer, Mixing
- James Cadsky – Assistant Engineer, Mixing Assistant, Assistant Producer
- Simon Clark – Keyboards
- Mike Coulson – Art Direction
- Meabh Flynn – Assistant Engineer, Mixing Assistant, Assistant Producer
- Stephen Lovell-Davis – Photography
- Emile Ogoo – Guitar, Background Vocals
- Sooliman E. Rogie – Guitar, Vocals, Background Vocals
- Zozo Shuaibu – Percussion, Bass, Background Vocals
- Tony Stiles – Design
- Danny Thompson – Double Bass
