= Highlife =

Ghanaian musical genre

- Stylistic origins: Palm-wine music; Akan music; Akan folklore; other African music genres
- Cultural origins: 1870s, Gold Coast, British West Africa (modern-day Ghana)
- Derivative forms: Makossa; Afrobeat; Hiplife

Fusion genres
- Raglife

Regional scenes
- Igbo highlife

Highlife music and dance
- UNESCO Intangible Cultural Heritage
- Country: Ghana
- Reference: 02141
- Region: Africa

Inscription history
- Inscription: 2025 (20th session)
- List: Representative

Highlife is a Ghanaian music genre that originated along the coastal cities of present-day Ghana in the 19th century, during its history as a colony of the British and through its trade routes in coastal areas. It blends multiple local African metres with Western jazz melodies. It uses the melodic and main rhythmic structures of traditional African music, but is typically played with Western instruments. Highlife is characterized by jazzy horns and guitars which lead the band and its use of the two-finger plucking guitar style that is typical of African music. Since the late 2010s, particularly from 2018 onward, it has acquired an uptempo, synth-driven sound.

Highlife gained popularity and the genre spread throughout West African regions. After the Second World War, its popularity came within the Igbo people of Nigeria, as they were influenced to form Igbo highlife which became their country's most popular music genre in the 1960s. Pioneers Rex Lawson, E. T. Mensah and Victor Uwaifo all perfected this sound by infusing traditional Africa drums and western "native blues".

Highlife has remained a part of popular music for Ghanaians and their diaspora globally through its integration with religious institutions and the positive effect it has had on immigrating Ghanaians leaving their homeland. In 2025, it was recognized as intangible cultural heritage by UNESCO.

== History ==
The following arpeggiated highlife guitar part is modelled after an Afro-Cuban guajeo. The pattern of attack-points is nearly identical to the 3-2 clave motif guajeo as shown below. The bell pattern known in Cuba as clave is indigenous to Ghana, and is used in highlife.

Top: clave. Bottom: highlife guitar part.

Highlife originated in West Africa through colonialism and trade, drawing on regional musical styles.

=== Palm wine music ===
Palm-wine music, also known as maringa in Sierra Leone, was one style that originated on coastal locations when local musicians began using portable instruments brought by traders and fused it with local string and percussion instruments. It was usually played in a syncopated 4/4 metre. This music was played in low class palm-wine bars at ports where sailors, dock workers, and working class locals would drink and listen to the music. Palm-wine music eventually worked its way inland and a more Africanized version came containing 12/8 polyrhythms; this subgenre would be known as the "Native Blues". This style would gain popularity up until World War II when production of the records was stopped.

=== Brass-band highlife ===
A style of highlife that resembled western brass bands in European forts across West Africa. The military would use local musicians in their brass band regiments and taught them linear marching music. After these musicians saw how the West Indian regimental bandsmen practiced traditional music in their spare time it inspired them to do the same. The fusion of linear marching music with polyrhythmic local music created a danceable style called adaha, as well as a style with cheaper, local instruments called konkoma. This fusion was similar to the birth of jazz in New Orleans.

=== Dance and guitar band highlife ===
In the 1920s, Ghanaian musicians incorporated foreign influences like the foxtrot and calypso with Ghanaian rhythms like osibisaba (Fante). Highlife was associated with the local African aristocracy during the colonial period, and was played by numerous bands including the Jazz Kings, Cape Coast Sugar Babies, and Accra Orchestra along the country's coast. The high class audience members who enjoyed the music in select clubs gave the music its name. The dance orchestra leader Yebuah Mensah (E.T. Mensah's older brother) told John Collins in 1973 that the term 'highlife' appeared in the early 1920s "as a catch-phrase for the orchestrated indigenous songs played at [exclusive] clubs by such early dance bands as the Jazz Kings, the Cape Coast Sugar Babies, the Sekondi Nanshamang and later the Accra Orchestra. The people outside called it the highlife as they did not reach the class of the couples going inside, who not only had to pay a relatively high entrance fee of about 7s 6d (seven shillings and sixpence), but also had to wear full evening dress, including top-hats if they could afford it."

Jacob Asare (also known as Kwame Asare or Jacob Sam) is credited as the first Ghanaian musician to record a song in the highlife genre. In June 1928, he and his group, the Kumasi Trio, recorded "Yaa Amponsah" (Amponsah Parts I & II) in London for the Zonophone label. These recordings are widely regarded as the earliest examples of Ghanaian guitar-band highlife. From the 1930s, highlife spread via Ghanaian workers to Sierra Leone, Liberia, Nigeria and Gambia among other West African countries, where the music quickly gained popularity.

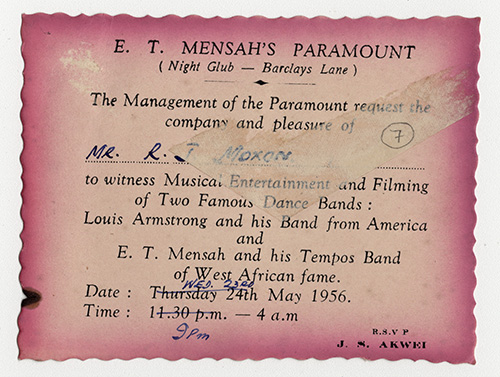
An invitation to a concert featuring Louis Armstrong "from America" and E. T. Mensah and his Tempos Band "of West African Fame"

In the 1940s, the music diverged into two distinct streams: dance band highlife and guitar band highlife. Guitar band highlife featured smaller bands and, at least initially, was most common in rural areas. Because of the history of stringed instruments like the seprewa in the region, musicians were happy to incorporate the guitar. They also used the dagomba style, borrowed from Kru sailors from Liberia, to create highlife's two-finger picking style. Guitar band highlife also featured singing, drums and claves. E.K. Nyame and his Akan Trio helped to popularize guitar band highlife, and would release over 400 records during Nyame's lifetime. Dance band highlife, by contrast, was more rooted in urban settings. In the post-war period, larger dance orchestras began to be replaced by smaller professional dance bands, typified by the success of E.T. Mensah and the Tempos. As foreign troops departed, the primary audiences became increasingly Ghanaian, and the music changed to cater to their tastes. Mensah's fame soared after he played with Louis Armstrong in Accra in May 1956, and he eventually earned the nickname, the "King of Highlife". Also important from the 1950s onward was musician King Bruce, who served as band leader to the Black Beats. Some other early bands were, the Red Spots, the Rhythm Aces, the Ramblers and Broadway-Uhuru.

=== The Ghanaian diaspora ===
Economic problems led to a mass migration of Ghanaians in the 1960s looking for more opportunities and after political instability in the 1970s and 1980s would cause more people and many prominent highlife musicians to leave and create clusters of communities across the west with Germany being a preferred destination because of its relaxed immigration laws.

==== Burger highlife ====
Ghanaians in Germany created a secular style of highlife that combined the genre with funk, disco, and synth-pop. It is believed it was called burger highlife because the largest communities of Ghanaians resided in Hamburg. The music became associated with migrants who would travel between Germany and Ghana. It also would become defined by its use of modern technologies; by the late 1990s, productions used solely electronic instruments.

==== Gospel highlife ====
Considered one of the most popular music genres to both Ghanaians and its diaspora, gospel highlife has outlived burger highlife because of its success in blurring the lines between religion and pop culture. This genre is similar to burger highlife but its inspiration comes from Charismatic Christianity and Pentecostalism. Its significance within the communities stems from the religious institution's ability to provide social and cultural infrastructure for the Ghanaian diaspora in Germany.

== Jazz in Ghana ==
=== 1950s ===
E.T. Mensah and Kofi Ghanaba were important musicians in Ghana. From the late 1950s, famous jazz musicians began to visit Ghana, such as Ahmad Jamal and Louis Armstrong who played in Ghana (1956 and 1960). Armstrong's All Stars member Edmond Hall came to Ghana in 1959 to set up a short-lived jazz in Accra.

Guy Warren was one notable musician who played with E.T. Mensah and the Tempos before moving to America and working with musicians such as Red Saunders to record the album Africa Speaks, America Answers, as well as playing with Duke Ellington in Chicago for a short time. Warren is credited with introducing highlife to the United States in an attempt to bring African-American musicians back in touch with the music of Africa, as awareness of African influence on Afro-American music was lacking before the "African musical renaissance" of the late '50s.

=== Musical examples ===
- Pianist Randy Weston recorded an album called Highlife in 1963, featuring compositions by West African musicians Bobby Benson ("Niger Mambo") and Guy Warren (Kofi Ghanaba) ("Mystery of Love").
- Saxophonist Pharoah Sanders recorded a song called "High Life" on Rejoice (1981).
- Guitarist Sonny Sharrock had a song called "Highlife" on the album of the same name (1990).
- Craig Harris (trombone) had a song called "High Life" on the album F-Stops (1993).

== See also ==
- Forms of Ghanaian highlife
