= Amponsah =

Amponsah is a surname. Notable people with the surname include:

- Koffi Amponsah (born 1978), Ghanaian footballer
- Reginald Reynolds Amponsah (1919–2009) Ghanaian potter and politician
- Daniel Amponsah known as Koo Nimo (born 1934), Ghanaian folk musician
- Kwame Amponsah Karikari (or Kwame Karikari) (born 1992), Ghanaian footballer
- Ophelia Serwaa Amponsah, Ghanaian footballer
