= S. E. Rogie =

- Born: Sooliman Ernest Rogers; 1926; Fonikoh, Pujehun District, Sierra Leone
- Died: 4 July 1994 (aged 68) Lewisham, London, England, U.K.
- Genres: Maringa, Highlife
- Years active: 1940s–1994
- Label: Real World Records
- Website: www.serogie.com

Sooliman Ernest Rogers "Rogie", (1926 – 4 July 1994) better known as S. E. Rogie, was a highlife and palm wine musician and guitarist from Sierra Leone.

== Biography ==
Sooliman Ernest Rogers was born in 1926 in the town of Fonikoh, Pujehun District in Southern Province, Sierra Leone. His father was Mboima Kpaka, a community leader. Kpaka, which translates to Rogers, is both a surname and a reference to the Mandé peoples, which are one of the largest ethnic groups in the Sierra Leonean population. At the age of seven Rogie found himself having to make his own way in life, paying for basic schooling by cutting and selling firewood. Unable to pursue his education further due to lack of funds, by the 1940s he had moved to Freetown and was living with an elder brother whilst employed as an apprentice tailor. Amongst the clientele he encountered were musicians, which led to an interest in learning to play the guitar. After mastering both skills he set up his own travelling tailor's shop, and having earned money from this during the day, he would provide free musical entertainment at night. Almost completely self-taught, his musical development was influenced by established exponents of palm wine music, and also by his brother's gramophone records of US country and western musician Jimmie Rodgers, whose unusual plucking style, vocals, and yodelling he liked to imitate. After being told incorrectly by a cousin that in the Kenyan Army he would be given the opportunity to study music in England or the United States, Rogie duly enlisted, but served only eleven months of the six years he signed up for. From 1952 to 1966 he then worked in the Accountant General's Office.

In the 1940s, he became a professional musician, singing in four languages, English, Krio, Mende, and Temne. His hits include "Koneh Pehlawo", "Please Go Easy with Me" and "My Lovely Elizabeth". In 1965 he formed a band called The Morningstars, but lost over half his financial investment in the venture when the musicians he assembled were made a better offer and left after just two months. In 1973, Rogie moved to the United States, where he settled in the San Francisco Bay Area and began using the surname "Rogie" as it sounded more African. There he performed at elementary and high schools across California, and received awards from the US Congress and Senate, the cities of Berkeley and Oakland, California.

At the invitation of BBC Radio 1 disc jockey Andy Kershaw, in 1988 Rogie moved to England where he bought a home in Finchley. On 17 March of that year he recorded a live session for the BBC, which was rebroadcast on their 6 Music Live Hour exactly 30 years later. In 1989, he appeared at the Cambridge Folk Festival, and two years later, assembled a band, The Palm-Wine Tappers, which toured the UK. He died on 4 July 1994 at the age of 68, shortly after recording his last album, Dead Men Don't Smoke Marijuana. He had undergone heart bypass surgery in February but against medical advice travelled to perform in Estonia, where he lost consciousness while performing onstage. He died at Lewisham Hospital, South London, having been flown by air ambulance from Tartu, Estonia.

== Legacy ==
A looped guitar sample from Rogie's 1962 song "Please Go Easy with Me", originally recorded in 1960 at his makeshift home studio, features on the track "Rich Man" from New York rock band Vampire Weekend's fourth album, Father of the Bride (2019). Rogie's sampled vocals also appear on the track "Dead Man Smoking" from Adrian Sherwood's album Never Trust a Hippy (2003). "Man Stupid Being" was used during the ending credits of the 2020 film Palm Springs. In February 2024, Val Wilmer chose "My Lovely Elizabeth" as one of her ten tracks when she was the guest on an episode of the BBC Radio 4 programme Desert Island Discs.

US blues musician Taj Mahal is reported to have said that he learned how to make guitar sounds resonate from Rogie.

== Discography ==
- "Waitin Make You Do Me So" / "Some One Some Where" (7" UK single) (credited as S. E. Rogers) (1964)
- African Lady - Highlife Music From West Africa (1975) (credited as Souleman Rowgie)
- Mother Africa, I Won't Forget You (1979) (credited as Soolyman Rodgie)
- The 60s Sounds of S.E. Rogie, Vol 1 (1986)
- Palm Wine Guitar Music: The 60's Sound (1988)
- The Palm Wine Sounds of S. E. Rogie (1989)
- The New Sounds of S. E. Rogie (1991)
- Dead Men Don't Smoke Marijuana (1994)

== See also ==
- African fingerstyle guitar
