= Koo Nimo =

Ghanaian highlife musician

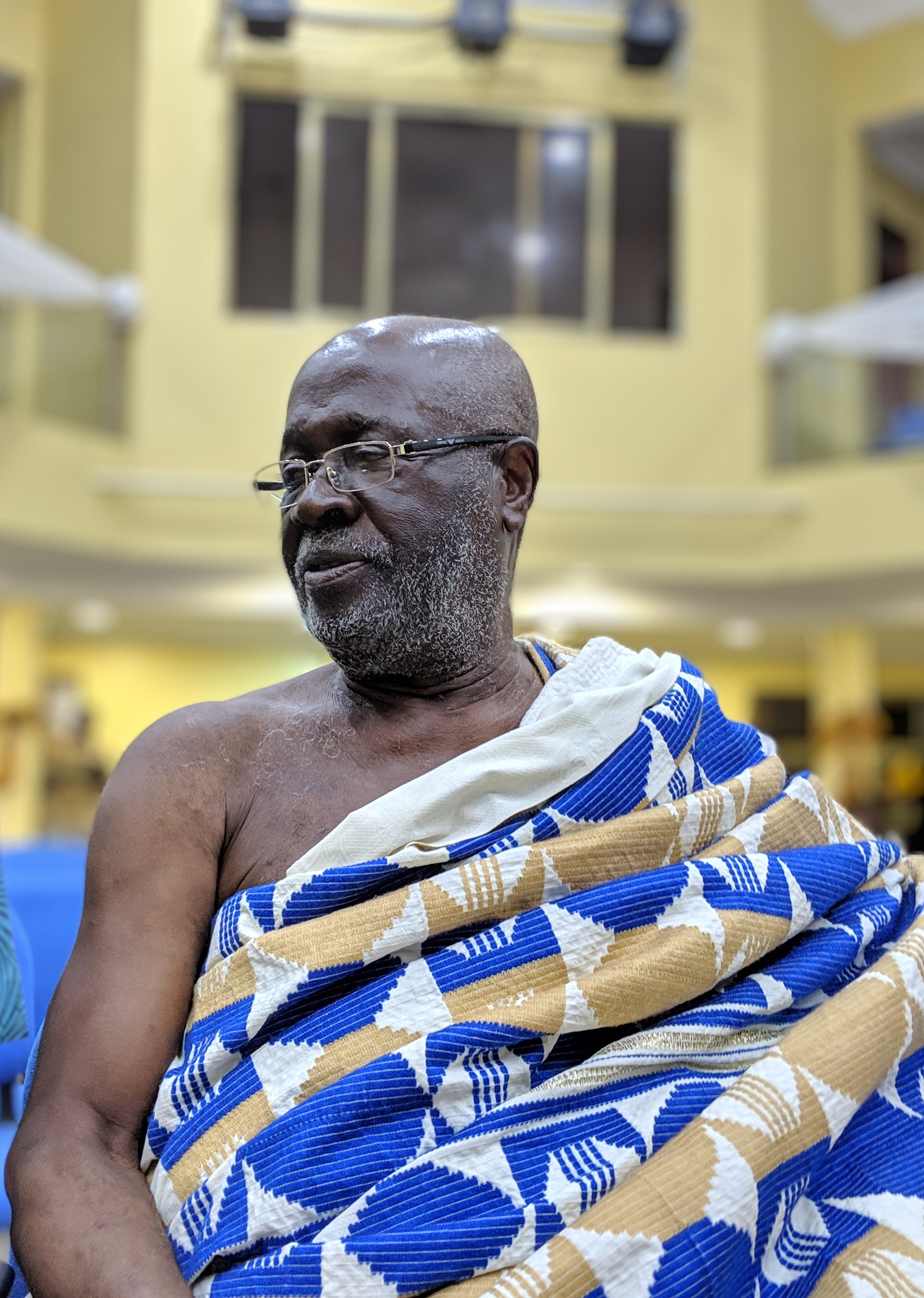
- Portrait of Koo Nimo in 2019

Background information
- Born: Kwabena Boa-Amponsem; Foase, Ashanti Region Ghana
- Origin: Accra, Denkyira Ghana
- Genres: Highlife; Afrobeat; Jazz; Palm-Wine Music
- Occupations: Guitarist; singer; composer; bandleader; record producer
- Years active: Late 1950s–present

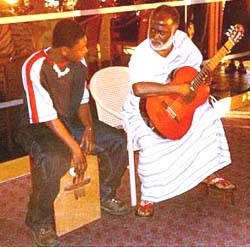
Yaw Amponsah and Koo Nimo in 2000

Koo Nimo (born Kwabena Boa-Amponsem on 27 January 1931), baptized Daniel Amponsah is a leading folk musician of Palm wine music or Highlife music from Ghana.

== Biography ==
Born in the village of Foase, in the Atwima District of the Ashanti Region in Ghana,Africa West Africa, he worked in various jobs in science and medical-related fields while maintaining his interest in music. In 1957, when the former British colony of the Gold Coast became the independent country of Ghana, Koo Nimo first received national acclaim through the formation of the Addadam Agofomma ensemble. Many of his songs tell traditional stories and are sung in the Twi language. Along with one or two guitars and vocals, the traditional Ashanti palm wine ensemble consists of traditional instruments of West Africa, including the apentemma and the donno, the frikyiwa (metal castanet), the prempensua (rhumba box), the ntorwa (hollow gourd rattle with beads or seeds woven around it on a net), and the nnawuta (consisting of two iron bells that provide the key rhythmic pattern) or dawuro (banana-shaped bell).

In 1990, eight of Koo's songs were released as a compact disk entitled Osabarima. This was the first work by a Ghanaian artist to be put on CD. In January 1992, at Columbia University, New York, USA, Andrew L. Kaye presented his dissertation entitled "Koo Nimo and his circle: A Ghanaian Musician in Ethnomusicological Perspective" and was awarded a Doctor of Philosophy degree for his work.

In 1998, he was employed as a Professor of Ethnomusicology at the University of Washington in Seattle, USA, for two years, before taking a similar position at the University of Michigan in Ann Arbor.

In 2006, Koo Nimo moved back to Ghana, to the city of Kumasi. He appeared in a January 2007 episode of the American travel show Anthony Bourdain: No Reservations, where he is shown playing music, discussing his music, and enjoying a lunch of stewed greater cane rat with host Anthony Bourdain.

== Awards, honours and memberships ==
In 1979, in recognition of his services to Ghanaian music as performer, teacher and administrator, Koo Nimo was elected President of MUSIGA (the Musicians' Union of Ghana). His countrymen appreciated not only his music, but his love and respect for tradition. In 1985 Koo Nimo was appointed interim chairman of COSGA, the Copyright Society of Ghana. More recently he has been made an honorary life member of the International Association for the Study of Popular Music, along with such distinguished names as Professor J. H. K. Nketia and John Collins.

In February 1991, in recognition of his services to music and to his country, Koo Nimo received the prestigious Asanteman award from the Asantehene. In March, he received the Flagstar Award from ECRAG (Entertainment Critics and Reviewers Association of Ghana). In 1991, he was invited to serve on the National Folklore Board of Trustees.

In March 1997, the Ghana government celebrated the 40th Anniversary of independence by awarding gold medals to forty of its distinguished citizens, one of whom was Koo Nimo. This was in recognition of his efforts to preserve traditional culture. In the next month he received the Konkoma Award for his contribution to Ghanaian Highlife Music.

He was recognized and awarded at the maiden Entertainment Achievement Awards. He was awarded for his unbridled contribution to the Ghanaian music industry, for over decades of great contribution to the Ghana Music. Sometime in 2017, the University of Education, Winneba (UEW) awarded Koo Nimo through their Music Department, he was honored with a Life Time Achievement Award.

Koo Nimo received the Lifetime Achievement Award at the 2022 Vodafone Ghana Music Awards in Accra for his contribution to the Ghanaian music industry.

== Discography ==
Albums

- Ashanti Ballads (1968)
- Osabarima (1990, re-issued 2000)
- Tete Wobi Ka (2000)
- Highlife Roots Revival (2012, Riverboat Records)

Contributing artist

- The song "Se Wo Nom Me (Tsetse Fly You Suck My Blood)" on The Rough Guide to Acoustic Africa (2013, World Music Network)
- The same song on The Rough Guide to Highlife (2012)
- "Adowa Palm-Wine Set" on The Rough Guide to the Music of West Africa
