= Anz (musician) =

- Origin: Manchester, United Kingdom
- Genres: UK garage; Jungle
- Labels: Ninja Tune
- Website: https://anzdj.bandcamp.com/

Anz is a British DJ and producer. Originally from London and based in Manchester, Anz has released five EPs and two production mixes on labels including Ninja Tune. She also founded the label OTMI.

== Early life ==
Anz was born in London, United Kingdom. Growing up, her family listened primarily to Afrobeat and Ghanaian highlife music, influencing her later style. Anz attended university in Liverpool, eventually moving to Manchester.

== Career ==
After gaining some exposure with a series of mixes self-published to SoundCloud, Anz released her first EP, Invitation 2 Dance. Anz's career developed significantly during the COVID-19 pandemic as a result of her prolific releases during the period.

She quickly became known for her annual production mixes, starting with Spring/Summer Dubs 2019. Partially as a result of the popularity of the mix, in 2020 Anz was awarded "Breakthrough DJ" by DJMag. Her next production mix, Spring/Summer Dubs 2020, received positive reviews, with Resident Advisor acclaiming its breadth, describing it as "fanned out over 30 plus tracks of singular UK funky, 2-step garage, dubstep and jungle."

In 2021, Anz's EP All Hours garnered additional critical attention. Several publications praised the EP, in particular for its instrumentation, intensity, and rave influence. Pitchfork described the EP as a breakout, specifically as "step up to the major leagues for a producer who can find magic in the murkiest nightclub corner."

== Style ==
Anz is known for the volume of her releases, having released several 90-minute production mixes. Her production pays homage to historical and experimental club music. Generally, her productions are cheerful in tone but fast-paced.

== Discography ==
=== DJ mixes ===
- Spring/Summer Dubs 2019 (2019)
- Spring/Summer Dubs 2020 (2020)

=== Extended plays ===
- Anz EP (2017)
- Invitation 2 Dance (2019)
- Loos in Twos (2020)
- OTMI001 (2021)
- All Hours (2021)
