= Simbing =

African harp-lute

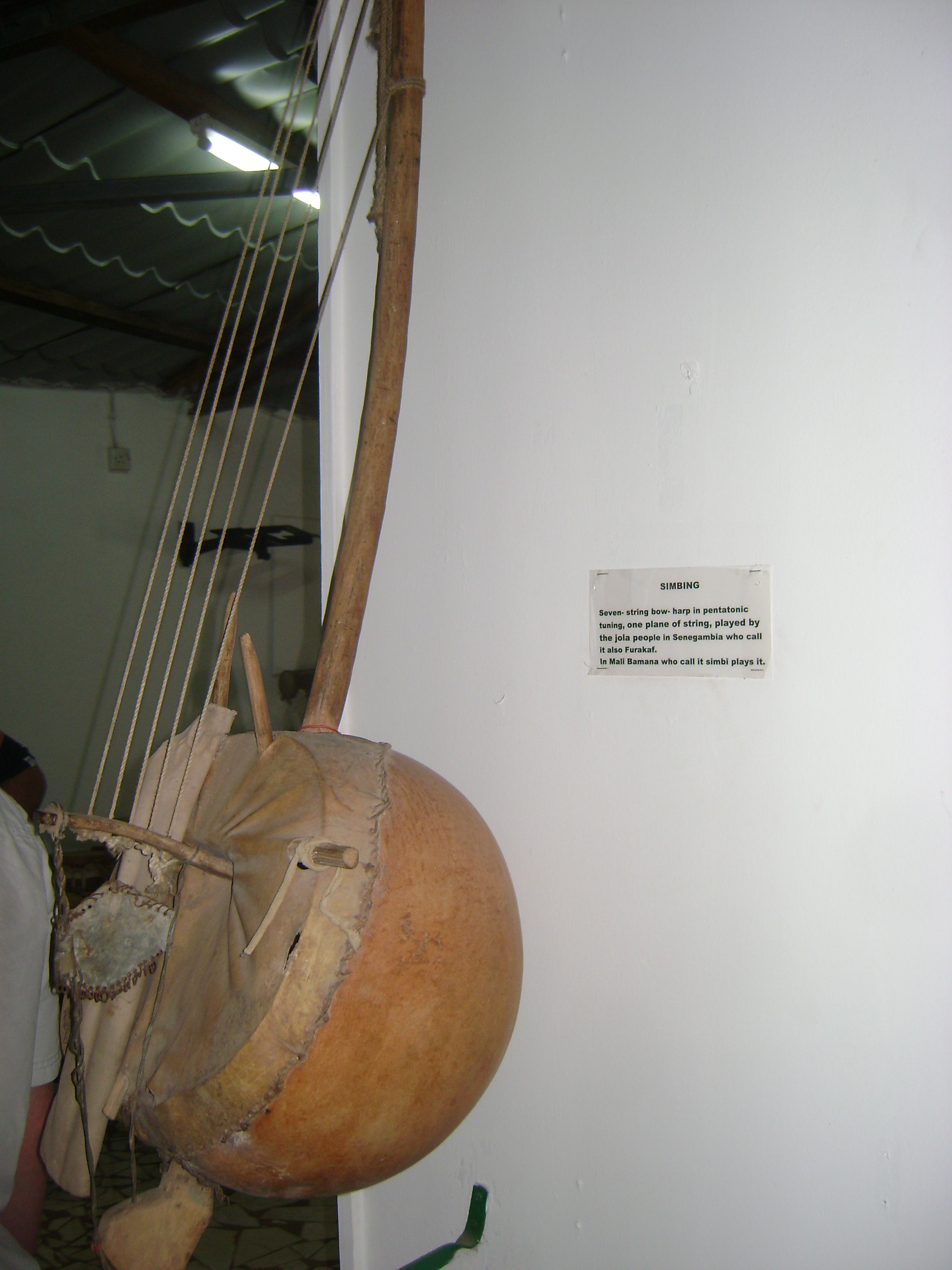
- A simbing in Bakau Crocodile Museum, Gambia

String instrument
- Other names: Furakaf (Jola); Simbi; Simbingo; Simbing; donsonkoni (hunter's ngombi)
- Classification: harp-lutes
- Hornbostel–Sachs classification: 323-5 (Acoustic instruments which have a resonator as an integral part of the instrument, in which the plane of the strings lies at right angles to the sound-table; a line joining the lower ends of the strings would be perpendicular to the neck. These have notched bridges. Sounded by the bare fingers)

Related instruments
- bolon; kora; seperewa

The simbing is a Malian harp-lute, used by the Mandinka people of Mali, and the Mandinka and Jola peoples of Senegal and Gambia. The instrument consists of a calabash resonator, a (usually curved) stick for a neck, a metal jingle attached to the neck, and a bridge that holds the string over the skin soundboard in a vertical line. For comparison, lutes (such as the guitar) usually have the strings held in a horizontal line above the soundboard. The instrument has five to nine strings. A simbing from the 1790s was reported as having seven strings by Mungo Park.

The instrument was played in the Mandinka and Jola cultures in the context of hunting. With the Mandingas, the instrument was played by "the hunter's musician" who narrated songs about the hunt and the animals. With the Jolas, the instrument is used to accompany men singing in groups.

In addition to the instrument's strings being plucked, its calabash gourd could also be tapped with sticks by the singer, to produce a percussive effect.
