= Music of Sierra Leone =

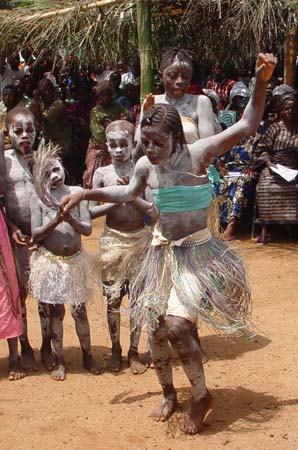
Students celebrate with traditional dancing in Koindu, Kailahun District, Sierra Leone

Sierra Leone's music is a mixture of native, French, British, West Indian and Creole musical genres.

Palm wine music is representative, played by an acoustic guitar with percussion in countries throughout coastal West Africa.

Sierra Leone, like much of West Africa is open to Rap, Reggae, Dancehall, R&B, and Grime.

== Sierra Leone National music ==
The national anthem of Sierra Leone, "High We Exalt Thee, Realm of the Free", was composed by John Akar with lyrics by Clifford Nelson Fyle and arrangement by Logie E. K. Wright. It was adopted upon independence in 1961.

== Traditional music ==
The largest ethnic group in Sierra Leone (2009) is that of the Mel-speaking Temne people, 35% of the population. Next, at 31%, the Mende, along with 2% Mandingo, have music traditions related to Mende populations in neighbouring countries. Other recorded populations were the Limba ( 8%), the Kono (5%), the Loko (2%) and the Sierra Leone Creole people (2%), while 15% were recorded as "others".

The wars and civil conflict throughout West Africa, have resulted in a decrease in the presence of traditional music artists.

== Popular music ==
=== Palm-wine ===
Sierra Leonean palm wine music is known as maringa, and it was first popularized by the Creole musician Ebenezer Calendar & His Maringar Band, who used Caribbean styles, especially Trinidadian calypso. Calendar played the guitar, trumpet, mandolin and the cornet, while also penning some of the most oft-played songs in Sierra Leonean music in the 1950s and 60s. His most popular song was "Double-Decker Bus", commissioned by Decca to promote the launching of a double-decker bus line. He eventually moved towards socially and spiritually aware lyrics.

=== Gumbe ===
Gumbe (also goombay or gumbay), is a Creole musical genre and has also had a long presence in Sierra Leone. The gumbe, a square drum with legs, was an important cultural symbol for the Jamaican maroon settlers who were to become part of the Sierra Leone Creole ethnic community. The drum had always been associated with the invocation of their ancestors (Bilby 2007:15), and played an important role in their Maroon strongholds in Jamaica in the 18th century, in their fight for freedom against the British. It was used for the communication of messages and also to warn them of future attacks being planned by the British. The sound of these drums provoked a trance from which these premonitions were made (Lewin 2000:160). The gumbe is still used today by the descendants of the maroons in Jamaica and Sierra Leone. Currently the gumbe enjoys a continuing presence in Creole culture in Sierra Leone. This drum is also still used in Freetown to enter into a trance and predict the future in events such as baptisms and weddings (Aranzadi 2010). Gumbe has also been influential on three of Sierra Leones’s 20th century popular dance-music styles: namely Asiko or Ashiko, Maringa and Milo jazz (Collins: 2007:180). Dr. Oloh was the most widely acknowledged innovator of Sierra Leone gumbe and milo jazz music

=== Afropop ===
Beginning in the 1970s, rumba, Congolese music, funk and soul combined to form a popular kind of Afropop. Major bands of this era included Sabannoh 75, Orchestra Muyei, Super Combo and the Afro-National. Sierra Leoneans abroad have created their own styles, such as Seydu, Ansoumana Bangura, Abdul Tee-Jay, Bosca Banks, Daddy Rahmanu, Patricia Bakarr and Sidike Diabate and Mwana Musa's African Connexion.

=== Modern ===
The internet has encouraged the youth to new styles of music. Many songs have political and social themes, informing the populace and checking politicians. The independent film, Sweet Salone, displays many of these artists, fans, and their music.

Mwana Musa (Musa Kalamulah) and the band African Connexion married Sierra Leone, Congolese and jazz rhythms. Mwana Musa was an able composer who worked with musicians such as David Toop, Steve Beresford, Ray Carless, Ugo Delmirani, Robin Jones, Mongoley (Lipua Lipua) Safroman (GO Malebo)Len Jones one of Sierra Leones finest guitarists, Lindel Lewis, Ayo-Roy MAcauley leading guitarist from Sierra Leone, Kevin Robinson, Paapa Jay-Mensah etc. African Connexion was signed to Charlie Gillet's Oval Records and produced "C'est La Danse", "Moziki", "City Limits", "Midnight Pressure", "Dancing On The Sidewalk", a soca-tinged soukous, and "E Sidom Panam" - typical Sierra Leone dance music.

== Sources ==
- Aranzadi, Isabela de. 2010. “A Drums Trans-Atlantic Journey from Africa to the Americas and Back after the end of Slavery: Annobonese and Fernandino musical cultures”. African Sociological Review 14 (1) 2010, pp. 20–47.
- Ashcroft, Ed and Richard Trillo. "Palm-Wine Sounds". 2000. In Broughton, Simon and Ellingham, Mark with McConnachie, James and Duane, Orla (Ed.), World Music, Vol. 1: Africa, Europe and the Middle East, pp 634–637. Rough Guides Ltd, Penguin Books. ISBN 1-85828-636-0
- Stasik, Michael. 2012. DISCOnnections: Popular Music Audiences in Freetown, Sierra Leone. Bamenda & Leiden: Langaa & ASC Leiden. ISBN 9789956728510.
