= Cape Coast Sugar Babies =

Highlife orchestra from Cape Coast, Ghana

Cape Coast Sugar Babies was one of the first highlife orchestras from Cape Coast.They were also known as the Light Orchestra. Their style of music is known as West African Highlife music.

== Background ==
In the 1930s similar orchestras of almost symphonic composition with popular dance tunes was introduced by Cape Coast Sugar Babies. There were others that played similar composition: Winneba Orchestra, the Asante Nkramo Band, the Sekondi Nanshamang and Professor Grave's Orchestra.

They are remembered by their tour of Nigeria in 1937. Highlife was taken out of Ghana to Nigeria by E.T Mensah and Cape Coast Sugar Babies in the 1950s.

== Songs ==
- Araba Takyiwa
- " Wo nim Owuo A whe Nna"
