= Bolon (musical instrument) =

Traditional Mande harp played in Mali, The Gambia and Guinea

Simbing
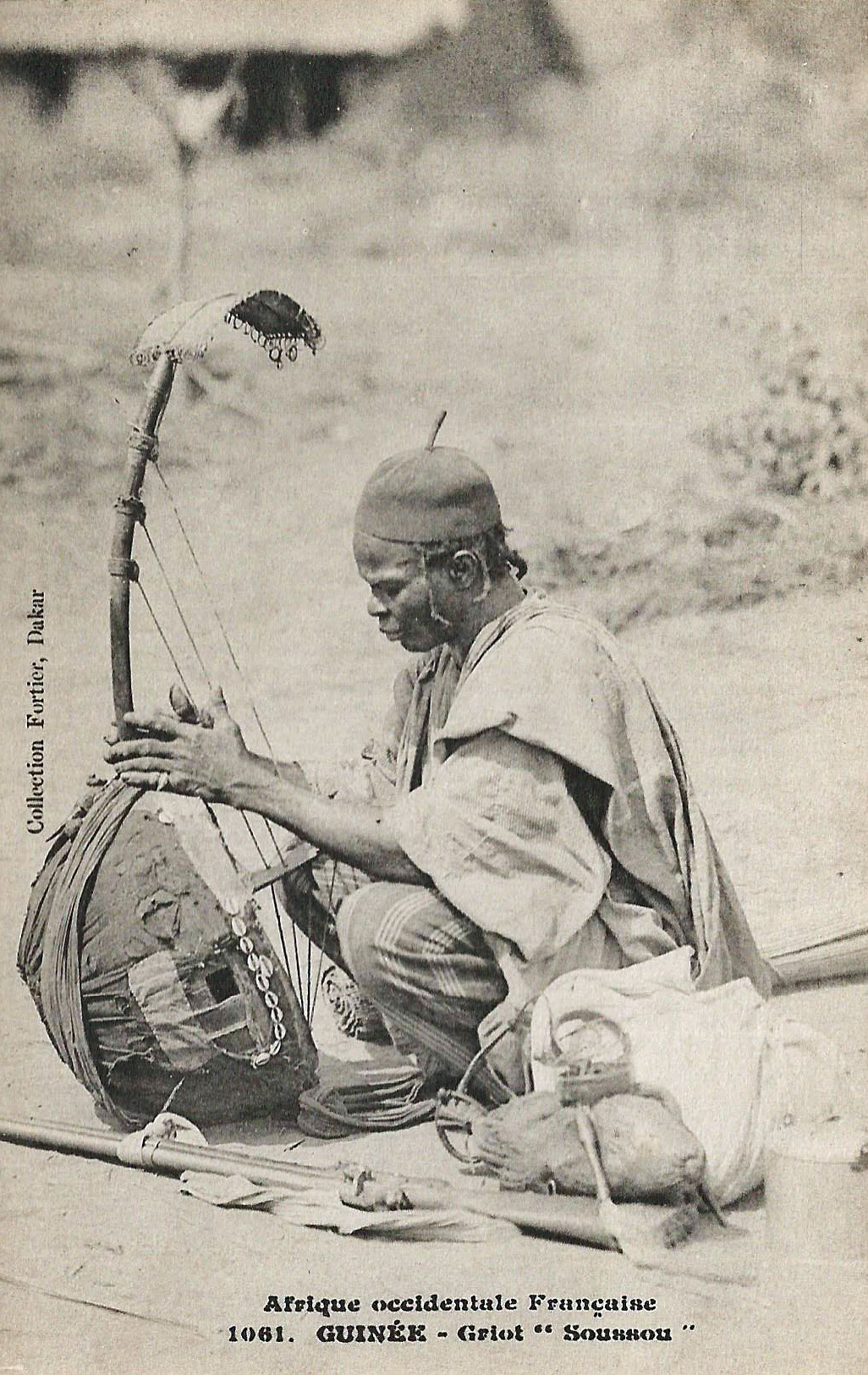
- A Susu yeliba playing a bolon in 1905, his rifle by his side. The bolon has a small, square soundhole and a nyenmyemo (metal resonator fringed with metal rings, mounted on the end of the neck)

String instrument
- Classification: harp-lutes
- Hornbostel–Sachs classification: 323-5 (Acoustic instruments which have a resonator as an integral part of the instrument, in which the plane of the strings lies at right angles to the sound-table; a line joining the lower ends of the strings would be perpendicular to the neck. These have notched bridges. Sounded by the bare fingers)

Related instruments
- gravikord; kora; seperewa; simbing

The bolon (Bambara: ߓߐ߬ߟߐ߲) or M'Bolon is a traditional harp played in Mali, as well as Guinea. It was notably played in hunting ceremonies or before a battle, to rouse warriors' valor. It was also used by the Jola in Gambia for accompaniment for men's choruses. Among other string instruments played in Guinea, the bolon is the oldest.

The bolon is a three-stringed instrument, constructed from a large calabash covered by unshaven goat skin, and a bow-shaped neck. When playing, it is placed between the legs with the strings facing the musician. In addition to plucking the strings, the musician also hits the calabash as if playing a drum.
