= John Collins (British musician) =

British-Ghanaian musician (born 1944)

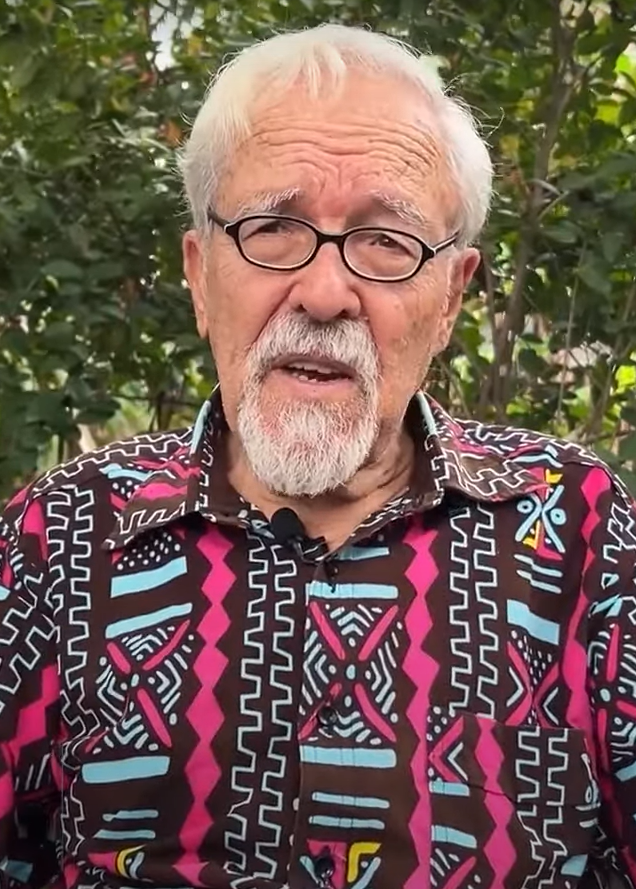
- Collins in 2024

Background information
- Born: Edmund John Collins; 1944 (age 81–82)
- Genres: Highlife, Afro-beat, soukous, Ghanaian folk music
- Occupations: Musician, journalist, author, lecturer, musicologist, record engineer, composer
- Instruments: Guitar, harmonica, percussion
- Labels: Otrabanda, Sterns, Naxos, Arion
- Website: www.bapmaf.com

John Collins (born 1944) is a UK-born guitarist, harmonica player and percussionist who first went to Ghana as a child in 1952 for a brief period and later became involved in the West African music scene after returning to Ghana in 1969. He is a naturalised Ghanaian.

== Biography ==
Collins originally accompanied his parents to Ghana in 1952, when his father was setting up the philosophy department at the University of Ghana. Returning to Britain with his mother, on her divorce from his father, Collins was educated in Bristol, Manchester and London, earning a science degree. He was also playing music and when he returned to Ghana in 1969 to study archaeology and sociology at the University of Ghana/Legon, he began to play with many local bands and has been involved with West African music ever since.

Collins has worked, recorded and played with numerous Ghanaian and Nigerian bands; the Jaguar Jokers, Francis Kenya, E. T. Mensah, Abladei, Fela Anikulapo Kuti, Koo Nimo, Kwaa Mensah, Victor Uwaifo, Bob Pinado, the Bunzus, the Black Berets, T.O. Jazz, S. K. Oppong and Atongo Zimba.

In the 1970s, Collins ran his own Bokoor highlife guitar band, which released 20 songs and, since 1982, he has been running Bokoor Recording Studio eight miles north of Accra. The studio released nine records and 60 commercial cassettes and has released three highlife CDs: Electric Highlife (Naxos label Hong Kong/US, 2002), Vintage Palmwine (Otrabanda, Holland, 2003) and The Guitar and Gun (Sterns/Earthworks, UK, 2003).

== Careers ==
Collins is a music journalist and writer with over 100 journalistic and academic publications (including seven books published in the UK, US and Ghana) on African popular and neo-traditional music. He has given many radio and television broadcasts, including over 40 for the BBC. In 1978, he wrote and presented the BBC's first-ever (five-part) series of radio programmes on African popular music called In The African Groove.

Collins has been a film consultant/facilitator, working for the BBC's Repercussions, Brass Unbound by IDTV of Amsterdam, The Highlife Story for Ghana Broadcasting, Highlife for German Huschert Realfilm, African Cross Rhythms by the Danish Loki Films (re-released in 1996 as Listen to the Silence by Films for the Humanities & Sciences, New Jersey, US), When the Moment Sings by the Norwegian Visions company, Ghanaian Art Music by Bavarian TV and One Giant Leap/Astronaut music-video for Palm Pictures/Island Records.

In 1995 he joined the University of Ghana, where he has taught African popular music, the history and sociology of music.

== Education ==
Collins obtained his first degree (sociology and archaeology) from the University of Ghana in 1972 and his Doctorate in ethnomusicology at the State University of New York at Buffalo. He has given lectures and workshop in Canada, the US, the UK, Scandinavia, the Netherlands, Germany, France, the Caribbean, Ghana and the Côte d'Ivoire. He has been a resident research-fellow at the Northwestern University African Studies Department at Evanston in the US and at Dartmouth Art College in the West of England.

== Activities in Ghana ==
Collins was on the Executive of the Musicians Union of Ghana (MUSIGA) in the 1970s and, together with Professor J. H. K. Nketia and the Ghanaian folk-guitarist Koo Nimo, was in 1987 made an honorary life-member of the International Association for the Study of Popular Music (IASPM). During the 1990s, Collins was technical director of the three-year joint University of Ghana African Studies Department/Mainz African Music Re-documentation Project, and for seven years was with the Ghana National Folklore Board of Trustees/Copyright Administration. In summer 2000 Collins teamed up with fellow guitarist Koo Nimo and went on a performance tour of the US eastern seaboard with him.

== Recent work ==
Currently, Collins is running his Bokoor Studio as a mobile one. He is the acting chairman of the Bokoor African Popular Music Archives Foundation (BAPMAF), formed in 1990. He is PRO for the Old Ghanaian Musicians Welfare Association (GOMAWA), consultant for MUSIGA, patron of the Afrika Obonu music therapy drum group and consultant for a World Bank project to assist the African music industry. He is also a Full Professor at the Music Department of the University of Ghana, Legon, from where he runs (with Aaron Bebe Sukura) the Local Dimension highlife band that toured Europe in 2002, 2004 and 2006 and released a CD in 2003 entitled N'Yong on the French Disques Arion label. He has also done some research into and documentation of highlife, a Ghanaian popular music.
