= Adaha =

Type of highlife in Ghana

The Adaha was type of highlife that was played on flutes, fifes, and brass band drums which originated in Ghana in the 19th century and then spread across West Africa during the 1930s

== History ==
The Adaha was a style of music played in the coastal areas by the Fante people in 1880s. The Adaha music of the Fante was the earliest documented syncopated style of brass band. European and West Indian soldiers taught Africans to read music and to play brass and woodwind instruments. The music of the colonial military brass bands evolved into Adaha highlife. The local African people created their own blend of brass band music from marches, polkas and nineteen century ballads. The Adaha music spread throughout the villages which made the people adapt to drums and call and response singing. It was centered in cities and towns such as Cape Coast and Elmina.
