= Ebenezer Calendar =

Ebenezer Calendar (1912–1985), or Ebenezer Calender, was a Sierra Leone Creole palm-wine musician who popularized Creole gumbe and palm-wine music in Sierra Leone and West Africa. Calendar heavily influenced Dr Oloh and other Sierra Leonean musicians. Ebenezer Calendar formed the music group, Ebenezer Calendar & His Maringa Band which was popular between the early to middle twentieth centuries.

== Early life ==
Ebenezer Calendar was born in 1912 to a Barbadian or Jamaican father and a Creole mother in Freetown, Sierra Leone and he attended local schools and he was a trained a carpenter and coffin maker following the completion of his education.

== Music ==
Calendar formed the group, Ebenezer Calendar & His Maringa Band in the early to middle twentieth century, which popularized Creole styles of gumbe and palm-wine music.

== Death ==
Calendar died in Freetown, Sierra Leone in 1985.
