= Palm-wine music =

West African musical genre

- Stylistic origins: Kaiso; other African music; calypso; mento; ragtime
- Cultural origins: Liberia and Sierra Leone's Kru people in the 1920s
- Derivative forms: Highlife

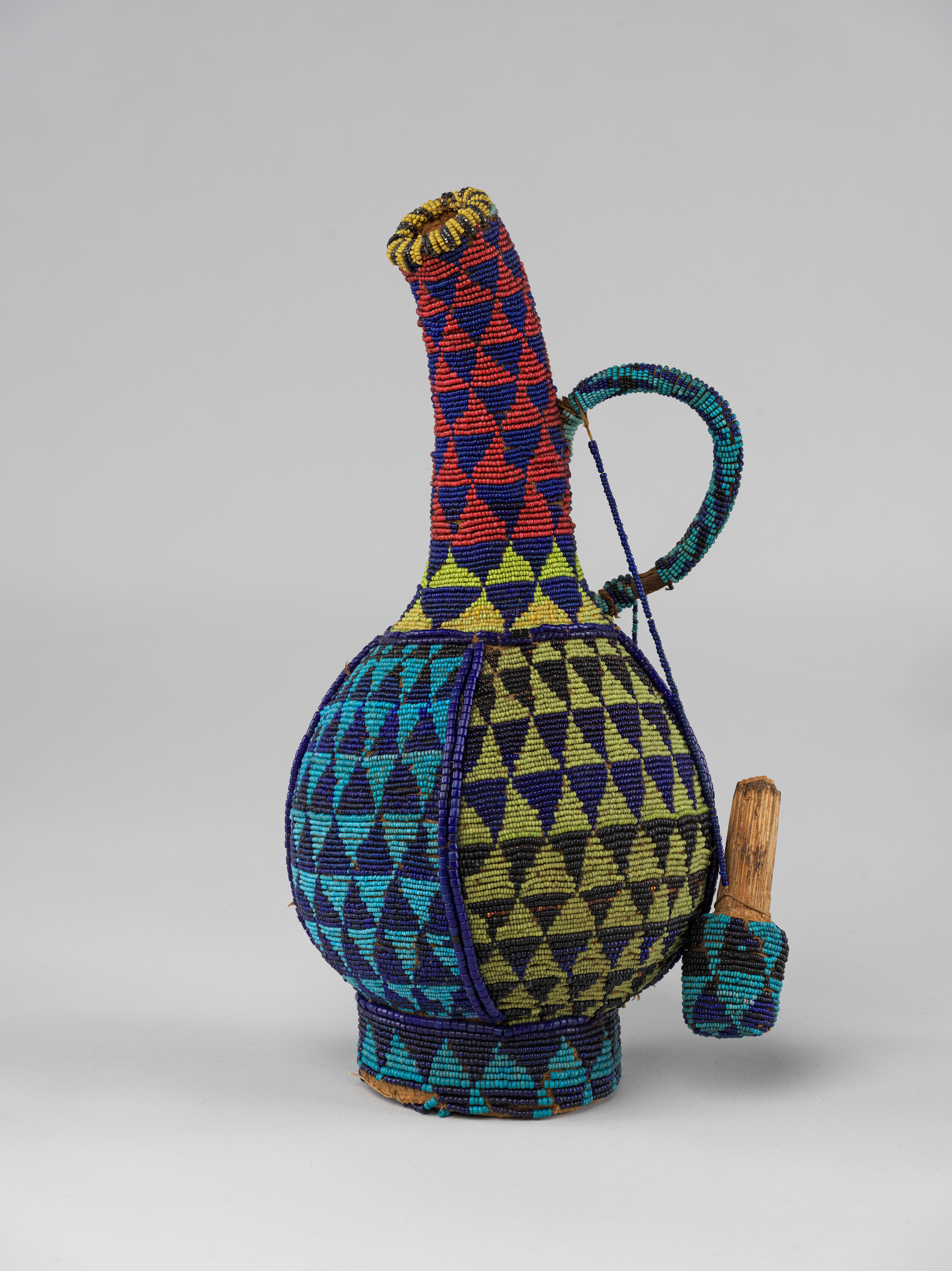
Palm-Wine Cup

Palm-Wine Music is a traditional West African popular music genre that developed along the coastal regions of present-day Ghana, Sierra Leone, Liberia, and Nigeria in the late nineteenth century. The genre has various origins, but primarily palm-wine music ties back to native musical traditions that were introduced to imported instruments, particularly the guitar. Palm-wine music is widely regarded as the foundation of many modern-day popular music styles. It evolved among the Kru people of Liberia and Sierra Leone, who used Portuguese guitars brought by sailors, combining local melodies and rhythms with Trinidadian calypso to create a "light, easy, lilting style". It would initially work its way inland where it would adopt a more traditional style than what was played in coastal areas. It would eventually gain popularity after Sierra Leone musician Ebenezer Calendar recorded songs in the 1950s and 1960s and continues to hold a small amount of that popularity.

== Etymology ==
Palm-wine music was named after a drink, palm wine, made from the naturally fermented sap of the oil palm, which was drunk at gatherings where early African guitarists played.

== History ==
Palm-wine music was born in the working-class coastal areas, particularly among dockworkers, sailors, and fishermen. This area was a major hub of the triangle trade, which brought in new European instruments. Music was performed in informal outdoor drinking clubs where palm wine was available, giving it its name. The genre was created by interactions between native West Africa, mainly on the shores of the Gulf of Guinea. Makeshift guitar performance styles spread from coastal to inland areas, where they shaped early forms of urban music. Palm-wine music has been described as one of the first forms of popular music in West Africa. Portable instruments and local string and percussion merged to create this style. It was out of this genre that the traditional two-finger plucking of a guitar came when musicians played it similarly to how they played the local lute or harp. This style was typically played in a syncopated 4/4 metre.

=== 1920s–1940s ===
In the 1920s, a Kru taught Ghanaian highlife guitarist Kwame Asare (or Jacob Sam). His Kumasi Trio made their first highlife recordings for Zonophone in London in 1928. As the music spread from the coast into the hinterland, the sound of the traditional Akan harp lute seperewa was infused and this evolved into the odonson or Akan blues and was called the "Native Blues". His Master's Voice and Parlophone Records distributed albums of the Akan blues in southern Ghana. This was in the 1930s and 1940s and featured artists like Jacob Sam, Kwesi Pepera, Appianing, Kwame, Mireku, Osei Bonsu, Kwesi Menu, Kamkan and Appiah Adjekum. At its peak of popularity in the 1930s, there would be about 200,000 Native Blues records sold per year before production was stopped due to World War II.

=== 1950s–1960s ===
Palm-wine music was first popularized by Sierra Leone Creole musician Ebenezer Calendar & His Maringa Band, who recorded many popular songs in the 1950s and early 1960s. Soukous and highlife were influenced by palm-wine music. Though still somewhat popular, the genre is no longer as renowned as it once was. Other renowned palm-wine musicians include Koo Nimo (a.k.a. Daniel Amponsah), S. E. Rogie, Abdul Tee-Jay and Super Combo.

Agya Koo Nimo is another renowned Ghanaian singer who is popularly referred to as the "King of Palm-wine music". The "Grandfather of Highlife", as he's often called, uses his music to tell life stories which has greatly influenced the Ghanaian and other West African music scenes. He was awarded the lifetime achievers award at the University of Education Winneba in Ghana.

== Musical style and structure ==
Palm-wine music is typically performed by small ensembles centered around an acoustic guitar. The style incorporates irregular rhythms, fingerpicking patterns, and narrative lyrics. Songs often feature storytelling, social commentary, or reflections on everyday life.

This music is widely considered to be the origin of the more modern genre, Highlife. Highlife was developed in anglophone West African centers during the early to mid-twentieth century. Structurally, Palm-Wine bears some similarity to the early days of highlife music, particularly in its rhythm and the use of guitar. Urban orchestras performed for elites and dressed formally, and this "high life" interested everyone who came across it. Although the genre later incorporated brass and other elements, the performance of palm-wine music remained relatively intimate and acoustic. During World War II soldiers stationed in Ghana shaped modern Highlife as what we would see today.

== Contemporary significance ==
Palm-wine music, despite its foundational role, has not necessarily garnered the same level of international attention as highlife or modern forms of African music. There have been some theories that colonial linguistic divisions played a role in the level of attention that different genres received, with some genres more represented in the francophone world than others in the anglophone world. Palm wine remains an integral part of the national music heritage in Ghana, with figures such as Agya Koo Nimo being recognized for their role in the continuation and transmission of national honors for Koo Nimo's contributions to music in the country. Contemporary figures, such as Kyekyeku, continue the palm-wine and highlife traditions with modern elements. Kyekyeku broke the traditional stereotype that instruments other than the organ or piano would only lead to drinking and bars by learning the guitar. He showed that there were ways to play these new, imported instruments without this stigma which again led to the eventual spread of Palm-Wine music.

== Artists ==
Notable palm-wine musicians include Kwabene Boa Amponsem, later known as Agya Koo Nimo, whose work has been integral to preserving traditional African musical forms. Contemporary performers such as Kyekyeku have contributed to renewed interest in palm-wine music by blending traditional acoustic styles with modern production and international performance circuits. Kyekyeku used the arrival of FM music in Ghana, which played a lot of American, English-speaking music to find the similarities in rhythms and eventually blend the music. This modernization helps to keep people interested in palm-wine music and brings attention to an often over looked genre.

== See also ==
- Music of Sierra Leone
- Music of Liberia
