= E.K. Nyame =

Ghanaian highlife musician (1927–1977)

- Born: Emmanuel Kofi Nyame; 24 December 1927; Kwahu, Ghana
- Died: 19 January 1977 (aged 49)
- Genres: Highlife
- Occupations: Musician and composer
- Instrument: Guitar

Emmanuel Kofi Nyame, best known as E.K. Nyame (24 December 1927 – 19 January 1977), was regarded as one of the "godfathers" of modern Ghanaian highlife music. He was a Ghanaian composer, guitarist, founder of E.K.'s band and the Akan Trio. He is noted as the pioneer of highlife songs in Akan language on concert stages.

== Life ==
E.K. Nyame was born on 24 December 1927 in Kwahu, Gold Coast (modern Ghana). He became a drum major, a leader of the school life band, at Adabraka Roman Catholic School in Accra. He was a member of the select church choir at Accra's first Catholic Church. He inherited a guitar belonging to a cousin who had been enrolled into the Second World War compulsorily.

== Career ==
He learnt Appiah Agyekum's style of playing guitar on radio and later in 1947, he joined the Appiah Agyekum's Band. He later left the band to form E.K.'s Band two years after joining Appiah Agyekum's Band.

E.K.'s Band was selected to accompany the Prime Minister of Ghana, Dr. Kwame Nkrumah, to Liberia in 1952. In the same year, Nyame formed a concert party trio, merging it with his guitar band and E.K.'s Band, naming the group the Akan Trio. The early established concert parties were English-language songs imported from America and England, and played by European settlers. The music was western ballroom music, quicksteps, foxtrots and ragtimes that were learnt from the British Army marching bands.

The Akan Trio sang highlife songs in Akan on concert party stages that were composed by Nyame himself; this had never been done before. His songs and plays had supported Nkrumah's movement for independence during the final years of British colonial rule.

By 1975, Nyame had recorded about 400 78 rpm discs for companies such as West African Decca, Queenophone and His Master's Voice building a reputation in West Africa. Nyame died in January 1977. He was given a state funeral, with his body laid out on a golden bed. It is estimated that 10,000 people attended his funeral.
