= Kwame Asare =

Ghanaian musician

- Born: Jacob Sam; 1903; Cape Coast, Ghana
- Origin: Accra, Ghana
- Died: 1950 (aged 46–47)
- Genres: Highlife; Afrobeat; palm-wine music
- Occupations: Guitarist; singer; composer; bandleader; record producer
- Years active: Late 1920s–1950s

Kwame Asare, best known as Jacob Sam (1903 on the Cape Coast – 1950s), was the first to record Ghanaian highlife music and was the first highlife guitarist.

== Life and career ==
He was a trained goldsmith. He moved to Kumasi and formed the Kumasi Trio. He was taught guitar by a Liberian seaman. He is known to be the first Ghanaian to record highlife music in Ghana known as "Yaa Amponsah". In 1928, on Zonophone in London's Kingsway Hall EZ series, he recorded guitar-band highlife classic music with his melodic and finger-style guitar picking. He was accompanied by the Kumasi Trio, featuring guitarist H.E. Binney and percussionist Kwah Kanta.

Under the name "Kwanin" he recorded his voice over on the JZ series. His recordings in 1928 were in Fante languages.
