= Guy Warren =

Ghanaian musician/drummer (1923–2008)

Kofi Ghanaba
- Also known as: Kofi Ghanaba; Guy Warren of Ghana; The Divine Drummer
- Born: Warren Gamaliel Kpakpo Akwei; 4 May 1923; Greater Accra, Gold Coast
- Died: 22 December 2008 (aged 85) Accra, Ghana
- Education: Achimota College (dropped out)
- Genre: African jazz
- Occupations: Singer-songwriter; arranger; actor; record producer
- Instrument: Drums
- Labels: Safari; Decca; RCA Victor
- Formerly of: The Tempos

Guy Warren of Ghana, also known as Kofi Ghanaba or by the mononym Ghanaba (4 May 1923 – 22 December 2008), was a Ghanaian musician, most notable as the inventor of Afro-jazz — "the reuniting of African-American jazz with its African roots" — and as a member of The Tempos, alongside E. T. Mensah. He also inspired musicians such as Fela Kuti. Warren's virtuosity on the African drums earned him the appellation "The Divine Drummer". At different stages of his life, he additionally worked as a journalist, DJ and broadcaster.

== Biography ==
He was born Warren Gamaliel Kpakpo Akwei in Accra in the then Gold Coast British colony on 4 May 1923, to Richard Mabuo Akwei, founder of the Ghana National School, and Susana Awula Abla Moore. Named by his parents after Warren Gamaliel Harding, the 29th president of the United States, he changed his name in 1943 to Guy Warren. When he was in the U.S. he became "Guy Warren of Ghana". He changed his name to "Ghanaba" on 1 July 1974, Ghana's Republic Day.

He was educated at the Government Boys' School, Accra, from 1928 to 1939. During this time, he developed his interest in music by playing for the school band. After passing with distinction, he enrolled at Odorgonno Secondary School in 1940. During the same year, he joined the Accra Rhythmic Orchestra under Yeboah Mensah as a drummer. He won a government teacher training scholarship to Achimota College, Accra, in 1941 with the intention of becoming a teacher at his father's school. While at Achimota, he participated in sports. He dropped out of the college in 1942 because, as he later said: "I was bored stiff with my studies and the stern discipline of the college, which attempted to change me into an Englishman."

In 1943, Warren Akwei enlisted in the Office of Strategic Services, a branch of the United States Army that dealt with overt and covert operations in World War II. He returned to Accra in the same year and joined the Spectator Daily as a reporter under the editor Robert Wuta-Ofei. He was editor of the Daily Echo, Gold Coast Independent, and Star of West Africa between 1950 and 1952. In 1944, he began broadcasting jazz programmes while working at the Gold Coast Broadcasting Service under the name Guy Warren, which he continued using for the next three decades. In 1951, he did a series of jazz programmes for the British Broadcasting Corporation (BBC), becoming the first African to host programmes with the service. He also acted in the 1951 film The Boy Kumasenu, playing the role of Yeboah. He worked at Station ELBC, the National Broadcasting Service of Liberia, as assistant director and disc jockey between 1953 and 1955.

He joined E. T. Mensah and others to form the jazz band The Tempos but left the band in 1951. In 1955, Warren left for Chicago and joined the Gene Esposito Band as co-leader, percussionist, and arranger. With them, he recorded his first album, Africa Speaks, America Answers (Decca, 1956). African music was popular, but it had not been integrated with world music until Warren. Fela Anikulapo Kuti and Osibisa popularized Ghanaba's music. During his stay in America, he worked with Duke Ellington, Max Roach, Charlie Parker, and Louis Armstrong.

By 1974, he had returned to Ghana, where on 1 July 1974, Republic Day, he changed his name to "Ghanaba". He later said: "After the United States disillusioned me, I wanted to resurrect the African component of jazz. African interpretations of jazz were different than African American version I heard in the U.S. I discovered Africanness in the U.S. ... I wanted to do African music."

In the 1990s, he played a role in the film Sankofa (1993), written and directed by Haile Gerima, who was working in the United States. It was filmed also in Ghana and Burkina Faso. Ghanaba continued to make music until his death aged 85 on 22 December 2008 at the 37 Military Hospital in Accra. He was buried in a coffin designed as a drum by Eric Adjetey Anang of Kane Kwei Carpentry Workshop.

== Family ==
Ghanaba's parents were Susana Awula Abla Moor and Richard Mabuo Akwei, founder and first headmaster of Ghana National School in Accra. As a child Ghanaba was a boisterous free spirit who found little peace and comfort with the strictness of his father. Richard Akwei, a disciplinarian, was an educationist and founder of the Akwei Memorial School in central Accra; also a sports administrator, he is credited with being the first Ghanaian Chief Executive of the Central Organization of Sports (COS), later known as the Sports Council.

Ghanaba was married twice and had six children. His first son, Guy Warren Jr., also known as "Odinga Oginga", is an artist specialising in sculpting, painting and carving. His second child, Glenn Gillespie Warren, also called "Ghanababa" (the son of Ghanaba), is a jazz drummer who played on the album That Happy Feeling (Safari, 1979). He recorded Bomdigi (Safari, 2008), the last album featuring Ghanaba. Glenn was chosen by Ghanaba to carry on his work, which was formally marked when Ghanaba handed Glenn his drumsticks. Ghanaba's third son, Gamal Abdel Nasser Warren, also known as "The President", was named after president Nasser of Egypt. Ghanaba's fourth son, Gamaliel Joseph Warren, inherited his father's musical talent as a jazz drummer.

In 1976, Ghanaba met and married Mrs Felicia Ghanaba, a Togolese living in Ghana. She gave birth to a daughter, whom they named Medie ("mine"); she is known as Medie Ghanaba Lemay. In 1982, the couple had a second daughter, named Gye Nyame Hosanna Ghanaba.

== Music career ==
=== 1940–80 ===
He began his career under the name Guy Warren as a disc jockey in 1944 with several jazz programmes on the Gold Coast Broadcasting Service (later Ghana Broadcasting Corporation) and Z.O.Y. Accra. He described his performance on the drums as love-making, seeing the African drums as a woman who could not be satisfied. While the punch and power of his playing easily tore the vinyl covering on Western-made drums, the animal skin covering the African drums remained intact. Nii Anum Telfer describes climbing on stage with Ghanaba as a feeling he would always remember. A firecracker would announce their entrance.

As Seth Paris notes, "With fellow musicians, like saxophonist Joe Kelly and bassist Oscarmore Ofori, Guy was part of the generation to bring the influences of African-American musical styles into mainstream Ghanaian culture. During 1948, Guy Warren worked with Kenny Graham's Afro-Cubists in the UK, and when he returned to Ghana, helped introduce Afro-Cuban rhythms to the country."

Travelling to the U.S. in 1954, Ghanaba spent some years working there, although he found little commercial success. Once, before a U.S. show, Warren appeared backstage in authentic African wear. However, the owner of the club (African Room) was trying to force him to wear what he considered an "Uncle Tom" outfit with a tattered straw hat, which was the norm for Calypso and African musicians at the time. Ghanaba adamantly refused to change, beginning a trend that was copied both on and off stage.

Ghanaba said in a 1973 interview with John Collins, "I had to make a choice between being a poor imitation of Buddy Rich or playing something they couldn't. I could play jazz well, but I possessed something nobody else had, so I started to play African music with a little bit of jazz thrown in, not jazz with a little African thrown in."

In 1956, Ghanaba's first album, Africa Speaks, America Answers, was recorded for Decca. It confirmed his reputation as a credible musician. It cross-fertilized African and Western rhythms and introduced authentic instrumentation into the music. In 1964, Decca and German musician Bert Kaempfert released an orchestral version of "That Happy Feeling", the most popular song on Africa Speaks, America Answers, under its original title "Eyi Wala Dong (An African's Prayer)" on Kaempfert's 1962 album A Swingin' Safari.

A year later, Ghanaba worked on the release of Themes for African Drums (RCA Victor, 1958), on which he wanted to use voices, drums, and trombone, with an African influence. He collaborated on this album with trombonist Lawrence Brown, who said what Ghanaba was doing was uncommon in jazz. Cover versions of "Love, the Mystery of" were recorded by Art Blakey and Randy Weston, and Weston used it as his theme song for 40 years.

In December 1959 readers of Drum magazine voted Ghanaba the number one drummer. His album African Rhythms (Decca, 1962), was supposed to be released a year earlier by Columbia but the deal collapsed. He then joined Martin Salkin and Milt Gabler of Decca. Ghanaba is listed in the Encyclopaedia of Jazz as a trailblazer who injected African rhythms and instrumentation into mainstream jazz. On one occasion in the early 1970s, when he performed a concert at the Ohene Djan Stadium in Accra, the crowd walked out. He had given up on live performances and stopped playing drums. He only released two albums in the 1970s: The African Soundz (RCA Victor, 1972) and The Divine Drummer (1978).

He asked Nii Anum Telfer to trace a letter from Africa Obonu, later to be known as Ghanababii, a drums and percussion ensemble based at La in Accra that had written to Ghanaba. It was after Ghanababii were contacted that he began to perform again. He played many gigs, including the monthly Free South Africa shows that he and Nii Anum Telfer organized at the Accra Community Centre in solidarity with Nelson Mandela, who was at the time in prison, and the people of South Africa who were fighting against apartheid. By March 1979, he had brought together Zagba Oyortey, Ofei Nkansah, Wendy Addae, Dorothy Gordon (aiti-KACE), Akuoko, Akwasi Adu Amankwa, Anthony Akoto Ampaw (Che-Che), Tsatsu Tsikata, Fui Tsikata, Prof. Akilagpa Sawyerr, Nii Kwate Owoo, George Quaynor-Mettle, Takyiwa Manu, Kwaku Opoku, F. Ato Austin and James Quarshie. Their intent was to collect, preserve, document, and promote African arts and culture. During the Soul to Soul concert in Accra on 8 March 1971, Ghanaba performed with an ensemble of gourd players from Benin.

=== 1980–2008 ===
By the early 1980s, Ghanaba had moved to Achimota and had his second daughter, Gye Nyame Hosanna Ghanaba. In 1983, in search of more peace and quiet, he moved to Korleman village. Although he released no major albums during this period, he remained active in the music industry in Ghana. He was instrumental in setting up the Musicians Union of Ghana and led the union as its National President from 1989 to 1992, advocating the need for Ghanaian musicians to use indigenous musical instruments. Ghanaba considered his greatest work to be the African talking drums interpretation of the "Hallelujah Chorus" by Handel. In 1981, he was enstooled as Odomankoma Kyrema (The Divine Drummer) by Aklowa, the African Heritage Village, based at Takeley, near London, England. Three historical concerts in dedication of Africa's Contribution to the World took place at London's Royal Albert Hall in March 1986. From this period, he performed at the National Theatre, the Goethe-Institut, the Du Bois Centre, and other venues in Ghana.

In 2001, he participated as The Divine Drummer in the stage show Yaa Asantewaa: Warrior Queen written by Margaret Busby. It was produced by Adzido Pan-African Dance Ensemble, the African and Caribbean Music Circuit, Black Voices, the Pan-African Orchestra and West Yorkshire Playhouse, which toured the UK between April 2001 and March 2002 and was performed in Accra and Kumasi.

Ghanaba liked to share ideas with musicians. Introduced to Robyn Schulkowsky, a female drummer from the U.S. living in Germany, by Sabine Hentzch of the Goethe-Institut in Accra, he said: "My whole life I thought I was the only one on earth who is crazy enough to deal with music the way I do. And now I have to recognize that there is another one; a woman, a white one." In 1992 he also set up and edited Hwe (Observe), a weekly newspaper.

In February 2005, during Black History Month celebrations, Ghanaba was awarded a Lifetime Achievement Award at the W. E. B. Du Bois Centre in Accra. On 18 January 2008, he handed his drumsticks to his son Glenn "Ghanababa" Warren at a ceremony at the National Theatre in Accra.

Ghanaba died on 22 December 2008. On 21 June 2009, a tribute was held at the Jazz Gallery in New York with Randy Weston, Obo Addy, and Kwaku Martin Obeng.

== Africa first ==
On 1 July 1974, the anniversary of Ghana's Republic Day, he adopted the name Ghanaba. From a young age, he wanted to remain true to his African roots. His pride in his African heritage was revealed in his music and the clothes he wore. His goal was to make the African presence felt in world music.

Max Roach said in 1974 that Ghanaba wanted to strengthen "Afro-American music" by turning to African music for inspiration.

He was disturbed by the desire of many Ghanaians for material goods manufactured outside the country. Ghanaba was among three people picked by Osagyefo Kwame Nkrumah to give advice on political, spiritual, and personal matters. He repeated the same service to Jerry John Rawlings when he became head of state.

In the 1970s, Ghanaba joined African Obonu (later known as the Ghanababii) and others to perform the monthly Free South Africa Shows. These were organized at the Accra Community Centre in solidarity with Nelson Mandela and the people of South Africa in the fight against apartheid. Other shows were organized to commemorate important dates in African history, such as Namibia's Independence Day, and also to honor Africans such as boxers Azumah Nelson and Ike Quartey. He was an avid reader who had a sign in his house that read "I would rather read". He collected books, newspapers, and other material that he hoped could be catalogued. New York University expressed interest in his collections. A professor of African Studies at the school established the African Heritage Library in Accra with most of the material coming from Ghanaba's collections. Decades earlier, he had wanted to donate it to the government of Nigeria because of its commitment to the second edition of the World Festival of Black Arts in 1977.

A Pan-Africanist, he opined that if political and economic developments did not go hand in hand with cultural developments no progress would be made.

The Ghanaba Afro-Jazz Gallery is an independent art project "dedicated to honouring, and preserving, the legacy of the legendary Kofi Ghanaba" and to promoting Afro-Jazz music and culture.

The title of Robin D. G. Kelley's book Africa Speaks, America Answers (2012) is taken from Ghanaba's 1956 album of the same name.

Hallelujah!, a film by Steven Feld about Ghanaba, was screened at the 6th Annual New Mexico Jazz Festival, Albuquerque, followed by a post-screening discussion with Randy Weston and Steven Feld.

== Publications ==
- I Have a Story to Tell …, by Guy Warren, Accra [Ghana]: Printed by the Guinea Press, c. 1962. The story of Guy Warren's sojourn in America as an African jazz musician.
- Hey Baby! Dig Dat Happy Feelin' – A biographical retrospective; produced by Roger Davies, Chelmsford, UK, 2003.

== Discography ==
- Africa Speaks America Answers (Decca, 1956)
- Themes for African Drums (RCA Victor, 1959)
- African Rhythms (Decca, 1962)
- Emergent Drums (Lansdowne, 1964)
- Afro-Jazz (Columbia, 1969)
- Native Africa (KPM Music, 1969)
- The African Soundz of Guy Warren of Ghana (Regal Zonophone, 1972)
