= Jazz Kings =

Ghana jazz band

Jazz Kings was a group of Ga musicians as the first band dance in Gold Coast.

== History ==
After the First World War, a group of Ga musicians formed the first band in Gold Coast called the Jazz Kings.

== Ghanaian dance bands (1950-1970) ==
- ET Mensah and the Tempos
- Black Beats
- Ramblers
- Uhuru, Broadway
- Globemasters
- Rhythm Aces
- Star Gazers
