= Frikyiwa =

The Frikyiwa (also spelled Firikyiwa, Afrikyiwa, or Sikyifriwa) is a traditional Ghanaian idiophone used mainly by the Akan people. It is a small hand-held metal percussion instrument that produces sound when two metal parts strike against each other. The instrument is widely used to keep a steady rhythmic pattern in traditional music and dance performances, especially in southern Ghana.

Unlike large drums that lead an ensemble, the frikyiwa usually serves as a time-keeping instrument, helping other musicians maintain consistent rhythm throughout a performance.

== Classification ==
The frikyiwa belongs to the idiophone family of musical instruments because its own body vibrates to produce sound without the use of strings or stretched membranes. According to the revised Hornbostel-Sachs classification adopted by the Musical Instrument Museums Online (MIMO), it is classified as an individual bell idiophone.

== Description ==
The instrument is made entirely of forged iron. It consists of two connected metal parts:

- a metal ring worn around the thumb or finger.
- a hollow, cup-shaped metal body held in the hand

When the player pinches the fingers together, the ring strikes the metal body, producing a bright metallic sound. The design allows repeated rhythmic patterns to be played with physical effort.

== Playing technique ==
The performer usually suspends the instrument from the right hand by placing a finger between the metal cups while the ring rest above the thumb. Sound is produced by bringing the thumb and finger together so that the ring strikes the body of the instrument. The frikyiwa produces sounds of indefinite pitch and is played using repeated rhythmic patterns rather than melodies,

== Musical role ==
The frikyiwa functions primarily as a time-line instrument. It provides a rhythmic framework around which drummers, singers, dancers and other instrumentalists perform. Because of its clear and penetrating sound, it helps maintain the tempo of an ensemble.

In Akan musical traditions, the instrument is frequently performed by women, although it is not restricted to female performers. In some ensembles, the lead female singer (cantor) plays the frikyiwa while singing to maintain the rhythmic structure.

== Cultural significance ==
The frikyiwa is found in many traditional Akan musical ensembles across southern Ghana. It accompanies recreational performances, community celebrations, festivals, storytelling, and traditional dances. It is valued for its role in maintaining rhythmic coordination.

The instrument also appears in Ghana's music education curriculum, where it is listed among the country's indigenous idiophones used for teaching traditional music.
