= Seperewa =

Traditional Akan harp-lute

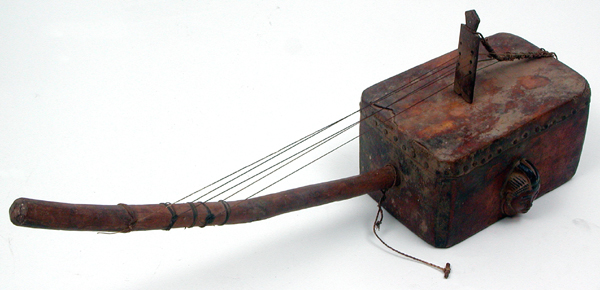

String instrument
- Classification: Ghanaian stringed instrument with 6-14 strings
- Hornbostel–Sachs classification: 323-5 (Acoustic instruments which have a resonator as an integral part of the instrument, in which the plane of the strings lies at right angles to the sound-table; a line joining the lower ends of the strings would be perpendicular to the neck. These have notched bridges. Sounded by the bare fingers)

Related instruments
- Bolon, koriduo, kora, aloko, simbing

Musicians
- Osei Korankye, Baffour Kyeremateng, Kay Benyarko

The seperewa, also known as seprewa or sanku, is a Ghanaian (specifically Akan) harp-lute, similar to the Dagaare/Sisaala koriduo, the Mandé kora, the Gere duu, and Baoule aloko.

== Description ==
The seperewa belongs to a class of harp-lute chordophones typical in West Africa, with Ghana marking the easternmost area where harp-lutes are played in the region. The seperewa is one of two types of harp-lutes played in Ghana, the other being the koriduo.

Modern seperewa typically have anywhere between 10 and 14 strings, set onto a standing bridge, and are connected to the neck of the instrument by winding them around it directly. They are recognisable by their square wooden box resonator, which differs from the calabash resonators of Manding harp-lutes like the kora or kamalengoni. They are either played with the thumbs, or rarely with the forefingers, or bow sanku, is attested to at least the 17th century, as the then newly established Ashanti Empire incorporated elements of its heavily Mande-influenced northern predecessor state Bonoman into its musical repertoire. Various harp-lutes similar to the sanku were once exclusively played in northern Ghana (which culturally was much more heavily influenced by the Mali Empire and today is still inhabited by several Manden groups; the Ligbi, Bissa, Dyula , and Wangara), eventually giving way to kologo and molo calabash-lute types instead. The harp-lute tradition since then was preserved predominantly among Akan groups in what became southern Ghana, with the only exception being the koriduo 6-string harp of the Dagari and Sisaala groups of northwestern Ghana.

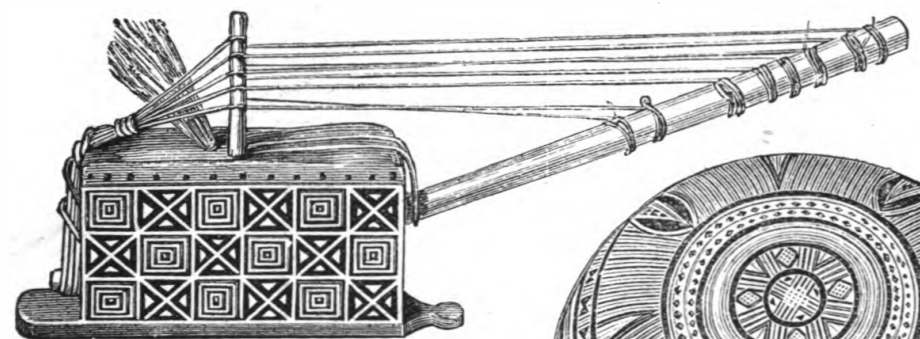
Ashante Seperewa

King Osei Tutu, the founder of the Asante empire, was said to have loved the instrument so much that his successor, Opoku Ware caused a replica of it to be made in his memory. The instrument was wrapped in gold leaf, and placed among the paraphernalia of the Golden Stool, which Osei Tutu established as "the soul" of the Asante nation with the help of his counsellor, the great priest Okomfo Anokye.

The seperewa was used to entertain kings, similar to a griot tradition followed by northern Ghanaian tribes, and was also played at palm wine bars, and at funerals. The instrument was said to speak kasa and was used either by itself or along with a song.

British colonization in the late 19th century saw the instrument decline in use as the guitar was introduced, and new chords and musical patterns from Europe entered Akan areas.

By the early 20th century, as the Akan kingdoms became incorporated into the Gold Coast colony, and Christianity was introduced by British missionaries, the seperewa found its way into churches, Christian weddings and conferences.

== Playing method ==
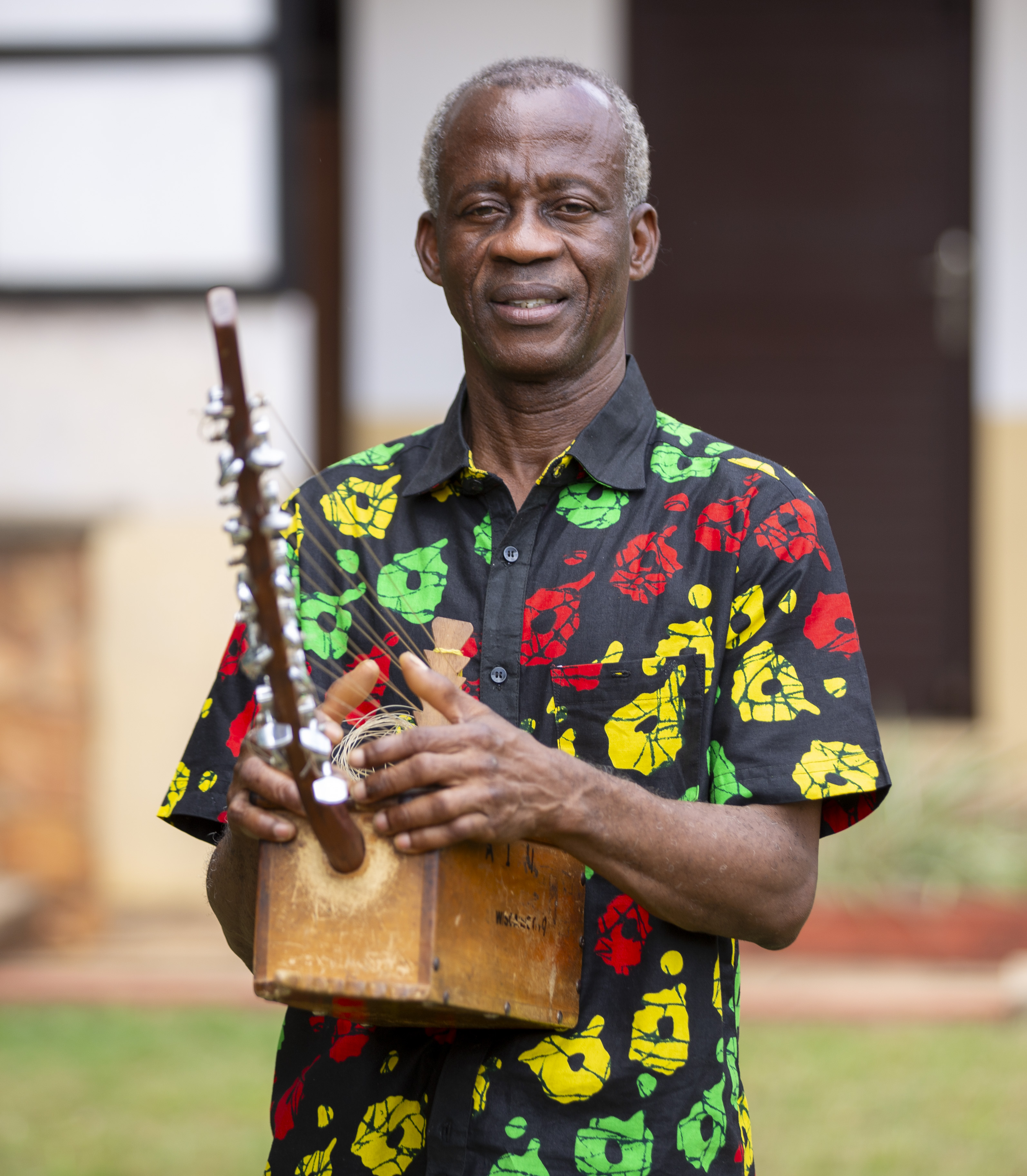
a man holding the seperewa in a playing position.

Seperewa can be played in different positions. The player can play while sitting down with the instrument resting on his lap, with the neck of the instrument standing upright. He may also play while standing, the instrument held firmly in the groin to gain enough support, the neck facing perpendicular in the same direction.

video of a lecturer playing the seperewa in a sitting position at the University of Ghana, Legon

Strumming and plucking are the two basic techniques applied and these are done by the thumbs and forefingers with some occasional assistance from the middle fingers. The seperewa player can even dance while he is playing or make some dramatic movements.

== See also ==
- Kora
- Simbin
- Harp
- Music of Ghana
- African music
