= E. T. Mensah =

Ghanaian highlife musician (1919–1996)

- Born: Emmanuel Tettey Mensah; 31 May 1919; Accra, Gold Coast
- Died: 19 July 1996 (aged 77) Mamprobi, Accra, Ghana
- Genres: Highlife

Emmanuel Tettey Mensah (31 May 1919 – 19 July 1996) was a Ghanaian musician who was regarded as the "King of Highlife" music. He led The Tempos, a band that toured widely in West Africa.

== Early years ==
Mensah was born on 31 May 1919 in Ussher Town, Accra, in the Gold Coast, West Africa. He began his early education at a Government School in Accra and later at Accra High School. At the age of 12, he learned to play flute in the Government School band and in 1932 he began playing piccolo and flute in the Accra Orchestra, a schoolchildren's band. The leader of the Accra Orchestra at the time was a teacher, Joe Lamptey, who gathered talented young people together to form a band. Mensah continued to play with this orchestra and also learnt to play the alto-saxophone. His musical career was given an opportunity when he was able to finance his own musical ventures by opening a pharmacy.

E. T. Mensah also has an elder brother, Yebuah Mensah, who was the leader of a dance orchestra in the Gold Coast. Yebuah Mensah and his younger brother E. T. Mensah formed the Accra Rhythmic Orchestra, which won the Lambeth Walk Dance Competition in 1939 at the King George Memorial Hall, now known as the Parliament House in Ghana.

== The Tempos and later career ==
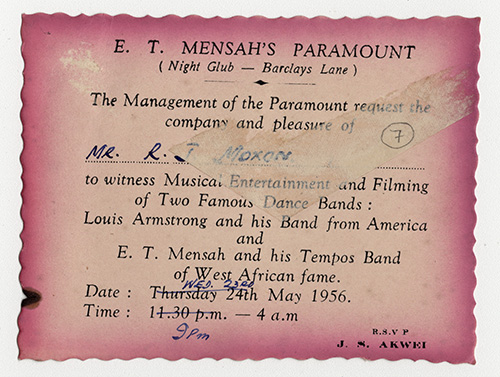
An invitation to a concert featuring Louis Armstrong "from America" and E. T. Mensah and his Tempos Band "of West African Fame"

The original "Tempos" band was formed in 1946 as a "jam session" group by some European soldiers stationed in Accra. It played for army dances and at the Accra club. Over time, African musicians replaced the European ones, until finally it became an all-African band, led by Joe Kelly and then Guy Warren. Mensah joined the band in 1947. Shortly after this, the band split up, to be reformed again with Mensah as its leader. In 1953, E. T. Mensah and the Tempos had a successful tour in Britain. The group gained international attention and in 1957 Mensah performed with Louis Armstrong.

Among Mensah's notable compositions is "Ghana Freedom", described by Myjoyonline as "a timeless record made commercially successful by its melodious composition and significance to Ghana’s independence. The lyrics, '…toils of the brave and the sweat of their labour, toils of the brave which have brought results', embody the struggle and reward of the Gold Coasters’ resilience for sovereignty."

The highlife style of music started to decline in the 1960s, but E. T. Mensah remained active for years afterwards. He co-starred with the Nigerian trumpeter Dr Victor Abimbola Olaiya on a highly successful album, Highlife Giants of Africa Vol. 1, released in 1983.

== Discography ==
E. T. Mensah & The Tempos

- King of Highlife Anthology, four-CD box (2015, RetroAfrica)

Contributing artist

- The Rough Guide to West African Music (1996, World Music Network)
- The Rough Guide to Highlife (2003, World Music Network)
