= Music of Mali =

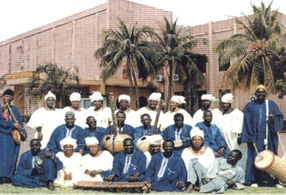
The Ensemble instrumental National du Mali, 2008.

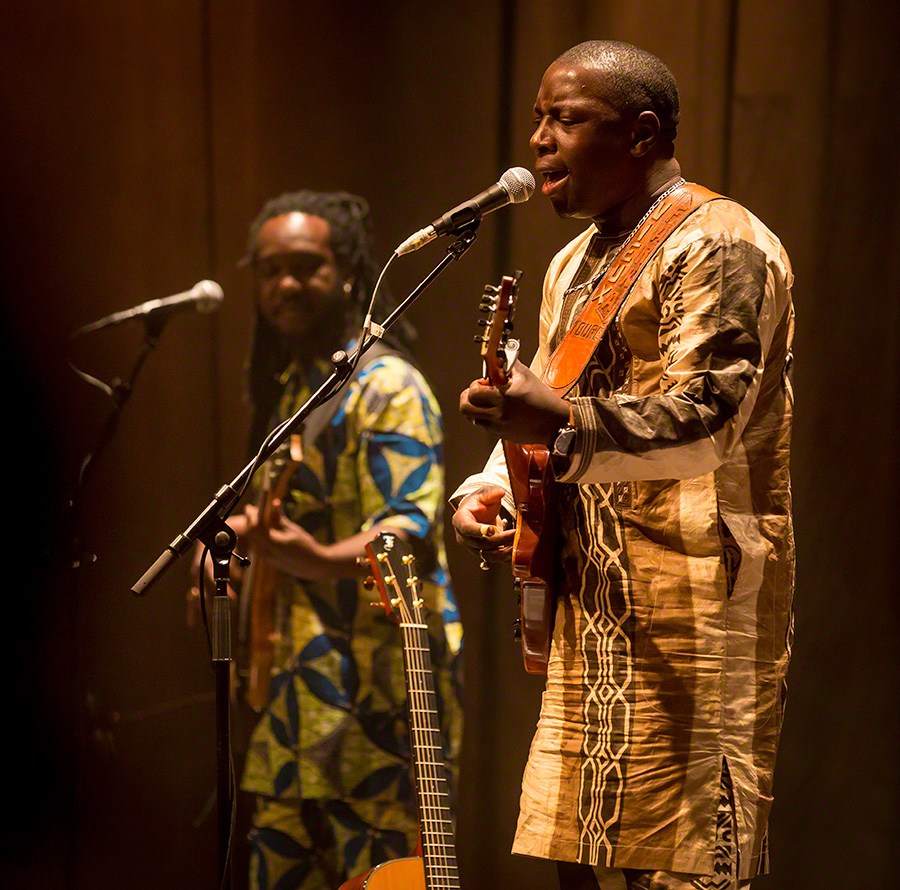
Vieux Farka Touré (right) and Valery Assouan are two international known musicians from Mali. The photograph is from a concert in Oslo in 2016.

The music of Mali is, like that of most West African nations, ethnically diverse, but one influence predominates: that of the ancient Mali Empire of the Mandinka (from c. 1230 to c. 1600). Mande people (Bambara, Mandinka, Soninke) make up around 50% of Mali's population; other ethnic groups include the Fula (17%), Gur-speakers 12%, Songhai people (6%), Tuareg and Moors (10%).

Salif Keita, a noble-born Malian who became a singer, brought Mande-based Afro-pop to the world, adopting traditional garb and styles. The kora players Sidiki Diabaté and Toumani Diabaté have also achieved some international prominence, as have the late Songhai/Fula guitarist Ali Farka Touré and his successors Afel Bocoum and Vieux Farka Touré, the Tuareg band Tinariwen, the duo Amadou et Mariam and Oumou Sangare. Mory Kanté saw major mainstream success with techno-influenced Mande music.

While internationally Malian popular music has been known more for its male artists, there are some exceptions: Fatoumata Diawara, prominent Malian singer and guitarist, has even been nominated to two Grammy Awards. Domestically, since at least the 1980s, female singers such as Kandia Kouyaté are ubiquitous on radio and television, in markets and on street-corner stalls. Fans follow them for the moralizing nature of their lyrics, the perception that they embody tradition and their role as fashion trend-setters.

== National music ==
The national anthem of Mali is "Le Mali". After independence under President Modibo Keita orchestras were state-sponsored and the government created regional orchestras for all seven then regions. From 1962 the orchestras competed in the annual "Semaines Nationale de la Jeunesse" ("National Youth Weeks") held in Bamako. Keita was ousted by a coup d'état in 1968 organized by General Moussa Traoré.

Most of Keita's support for the arts was cancelled, but the "Semaines Nationale de la Jeunesse" festival, renamed the "Biennale Artistique et Culturelle de la Jeunesse", was held every 2 years starting in 1970. Notable and influential bands from the period included the first electric dance band, Orchestre Nationale A, and the Ensemble Instrumental National du Mali, comprising 40 traditional musicians from around the country and still in operation today.

Mali's second president, Moussa Traoré, discouraged Cuban music in favor of Malian traditional music. The annual arts festivals were held biannually and were known as the Biennales. At the end of the 1980s public support for the Malian government declined and praise-singing's support for the status quo and its political leaders became unfashionable. The ethnomusicologist Ryan Skinner has done work on the relationship of music and politics in contemporary Mali.

== Traditional music ==
The Mandinka (Malinké), Soninke - Sarakole, Dyula and Bambara peoples form the core of Malian culture, but the region of the Mali Empire has been extended far to the north in present-day Mali, where Tuareg and Maure peoples continue a largely nomadic desert culture. In the east Songhay, Bozo and Dogon people predominate, while the Fula people, formerly nomadic cattle-herders, have settled in patches across the nation and are now as often village and city dwelling, as they are over much of West Africa.

Historical interethnic relations were facilitated by the Niger River and the country's vast savannahs. The Bambara, Malinké, Sarakole, Dogon and Songhay are traditionally farmers, the Fula, Maur, and Tuareg herders and the Bozo are fishers. In recent years, this linkage has shifted considerably, as ethnic groups seek diverse, nontraditional sources of income.

=== Praise-singers ===
Mali's literary tradition is largely oral, mediated by jalis reciting or singing histories and stories from memory. Amadou Hampâté Bâ, Mali's best-known historian, spent much of his life recording the oral traditions of his own Fula teachers as well as those of Bambara and other Mande neighbors. The jeliw (sing. jeli, fem. jelimusow, French griot) are a caste of professional musicians and orators, sponsored by noble patrons of the horon class and part of the same caste as craftsmen (nyamakala).

They recount genealogical information and family events, laud the deeds of their patron's ancestors and praise their patrons themselves, as well as exhorting them to behave morally to ensure the honour of the family name. They also act as dispute mediators. Their position is highly respected and they are often trusted by their patrons with privileged information since the caste system does not allow them to rival nobles. The jeli class is endogamous, so certain surnames are held only by jeliw: these include Kouyaté, Kamissoko, Sissokho, Soumano, Diabaté and Koné.

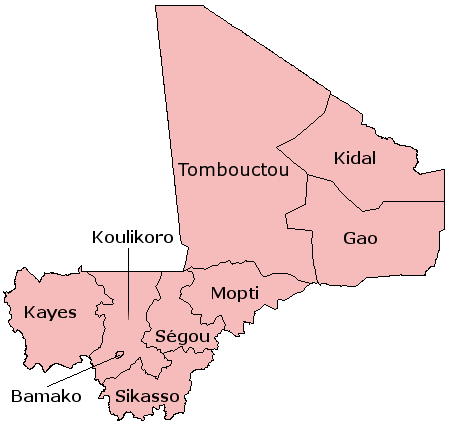
A clickable map of Mali exhibiting its eight regions and capital district.

Their repertoire includes several ancient songs of which the oldest may be "Lambang", which praises music. Other songs praise ancient kings and heroes, especially Sunjata Keita ("Sunjata") and Tutu Jara ("Tut Jara"). Lyrics are composed of a scripted refrain (donkili) and an improvised section. Improvised lyrics praise ancestors, and are usually based around a surname. Each surname has an epithet used to glorify its ancient holders, and singers also praise recent and still-living family members. Proverbs are another major component of traditional songs.

These are typically accompanied by a full dance band The common instruments of the Maninka jeli ensemble are;

- kora (21-24 string lute-harp, classified by the manner of playing as well as the bridge structure)
- balafon (slat xylophone with small gourd resonators)
- n'goni (4-7 string lute)
- dununba (large mallet drum hung from one shoulder and played with a curved stick, accompanied by a bell played with the opposite hand)
- n'taman (hourglass-shaped talking drum or tension drum, large and small variants)
- tabale (tall conga-shaped drum played with long, thin flexible sticks)

=== Mande music ===
The Mande people, including the Mandinka, Maninka and Bamana, have produced a vibrant popular music scene alongside traditional folk music and that of professional performers called jeliw (sing. jeli, French griot) The Mande people all claim descent from the legendary warrior Sunjata Keita, who founded the Mande Empire. The language of the Mande is spoken with different dialects in Mali and in parts of surrounding Burkina Faso, Ivory Coast, Guinea-Bissau, Guinea, Senegal and The Gambia.

==== Instruments ====
The kora is by far the most popular traditional instrument. It is similar to both a harp and a lute and can have between 21 and 25 strings. There are two styles of playing the kora; the western style is found mostly in Senegal and The Gambia, and is more rhythmically complex than the eastern tradition, which is more vocally dominated and found throughout Mali and Guinea. Ngoni (lutes) and balafon (xylophones) are also common.

Mande percussion instruments include the tama, djembe and dunun drums. Jeli Lamine Soumano states: "If you want to learn the bala go to Guinea or Mali. If you want to learn the kora go to Gambia or Mali. If you want to learn the n'goni you have only to go to Mali." Each area has developed a speciality instrument while still recognizing that the roots of the related forms come from Mali.

==== Djembe ====
The traditional djembe ensemble is most commonly attributed to the Maninka and Maraka: it basically consists of one small dunun (or konkoni) and one djembe soloist. A djembe accompanist who carries a steady pattern throughout the piece has since been added, as have the jeli dununba (also referred to as the kassonke dunun, names derived from the style of playing, not the physical instruments), and the n'tamani (small talking drum). Many ethnic groups, including the Kassonke, the Djokarame, the Kakalo, the Bobo, the Djoula, the Susu, and others, have historical connections with the djembe.

Most vocalists are female in everyday Mande culture, partially due to the fact that many traditional celebrations revolve around weddings and baptisms, mostly attended by women. Several male and female singers are world-renowned. Although it once was rare for women to play certain instruments, in the 21st century women have broadened their range.

==== Bamana ====
Bamana-speaking peoples live in central Mali: the language is the most common in Mali. Music is simple and unadorned, and pentatonic. Traditional Bamana music is based on fileh (half calabash hand drum), gita (calabash bowl with seeds or cowrie shells attached to sound when rotated), the karignyen (metal scraper), the bonkolo drum (played with one open hand and a thin bamboo stick), the kunanfa (large bowl drum with cowhide head, played with the open hands, also barra or chun), the gangan (small, mallet-struck dunun, essentially the same as the konkoni or kenkeni played in the djembe ensemble).

The melodic instruments of the Bamana are typically built around a pentatonic structure. The slat idiophone bala, the 6-string doson n'goni (hunter's lute-harp) and its popular version the 6-12 string kamel n'goni, the soku (gourd/lizard skin/horse hair violin adopted from the Songhai, soku literally means "horse tail"), and the modern guitar are all instruments commonly found in the Bamana repertoire. Bamana culture is centered around Segou, Sikasso, the Wassalou region and eastern Senegal near the border of Mali's Kayes region.

Well-known Bamana performers include Mali's first female musical celebrity, Fanta Damba. Damba and other Bamana (and Maninka) musicians in cities like Bamako are known throughout the country for a style of guitar music called Bajourou (named after an 18th-century song glorifying ancient king Tutu Jara). Bamana djembe ("djembe" is a French approximation of the Maninka word, with correct English phonetic approximation: jenbe) drumming has become popular since the mid-1990s throughout the world. It is a traditional instrument of the Bamana people from Mali (This is incorrect, the instrument is a Maninka/Maraka instrument adopted by the Bamana).

==== Mandinka ====
The Mandinka live in Mali, The Gambia and Senegal and their music is influenced by their neighbors, especially the Wolof and Jola, two of the largest ethnic groups in the Senegambian region. The kora is the most popular instrument.

==== Maninka ====
Maninka music is the most complex of the three Mande cultures. It is highly ornamented and heptatonic, dominated by female vocalists and dance-oriented rhythms. The ngoni lute is the most popular traditional instrument. Most of the best-known Maninka musicians are from eastern Guinea and play a type of guitar music that adapts balafon-playing (traditional xylophone) to the imported instrument.

Maninka music traces its legend back more than eight centuries to the time of Mansa Sunjata. In the time of Mali Empire and his semi-mythic rivalry with the great sorcerer-ruler Soumaoro Kante Mansa of the Susu people, Sunjata sent his jeli Diakouma Doua to learn the secrets of his rival. He finds a magical balafon, the "Soso Bala", the source of Soumaoro's power. When Soumaoro heard Diakouma Doua play on the bala he named him Bala Fasseke Kwate (Master of the bala). The Soso Bala still rests with the descendants of the Kouyate lineage in Niaggasola, Guinea, just across the modern border from Mali.

== Tuareg music ==
Tinariwen is thought to be the first Tuareg electric band, active since 1982. They played at the Eden project stage of the Live8 concert in July 2005.

== Fula music ==
The Fula use drums, the hoddu (same as the xalam, a plucked skin-covered lute similar to the banjo) and the riti or riiti (a one-string bowed instrument, in addition to vocal music. "Zaghareet" or ululation is a popular form of vocal music formed by rapidly moving the tongue sideways and making a sharp, high sound.

The Mansa Sunjata forced some Fulani to settle in various regions where the dominant ethnic groups were Maninka or Bamana. Thus, today, we see a number of people with Fula names (Diallo, Diakite, Sangare, Sidibe) who display Fula cultural characteristics, but only speak the language of the Maninka or Bamana.

== Songhay music ==
The Songhay are an ethnolinguistic group that traces its history to the Songhai Empire and inhabits the great bend of the mid River Niger. Vieux Farka Toure, son of Ali Farka Toure, has gained popularity after playing in front of an estimated 1 billion viewers worldwide at the 2010 FIFA World Cup in South Africa. He has also been called, "the Hendrix of the Sahara", since his music explores the affinity between West African song and Afro-American blues guitar.

== 20th century popular music ==
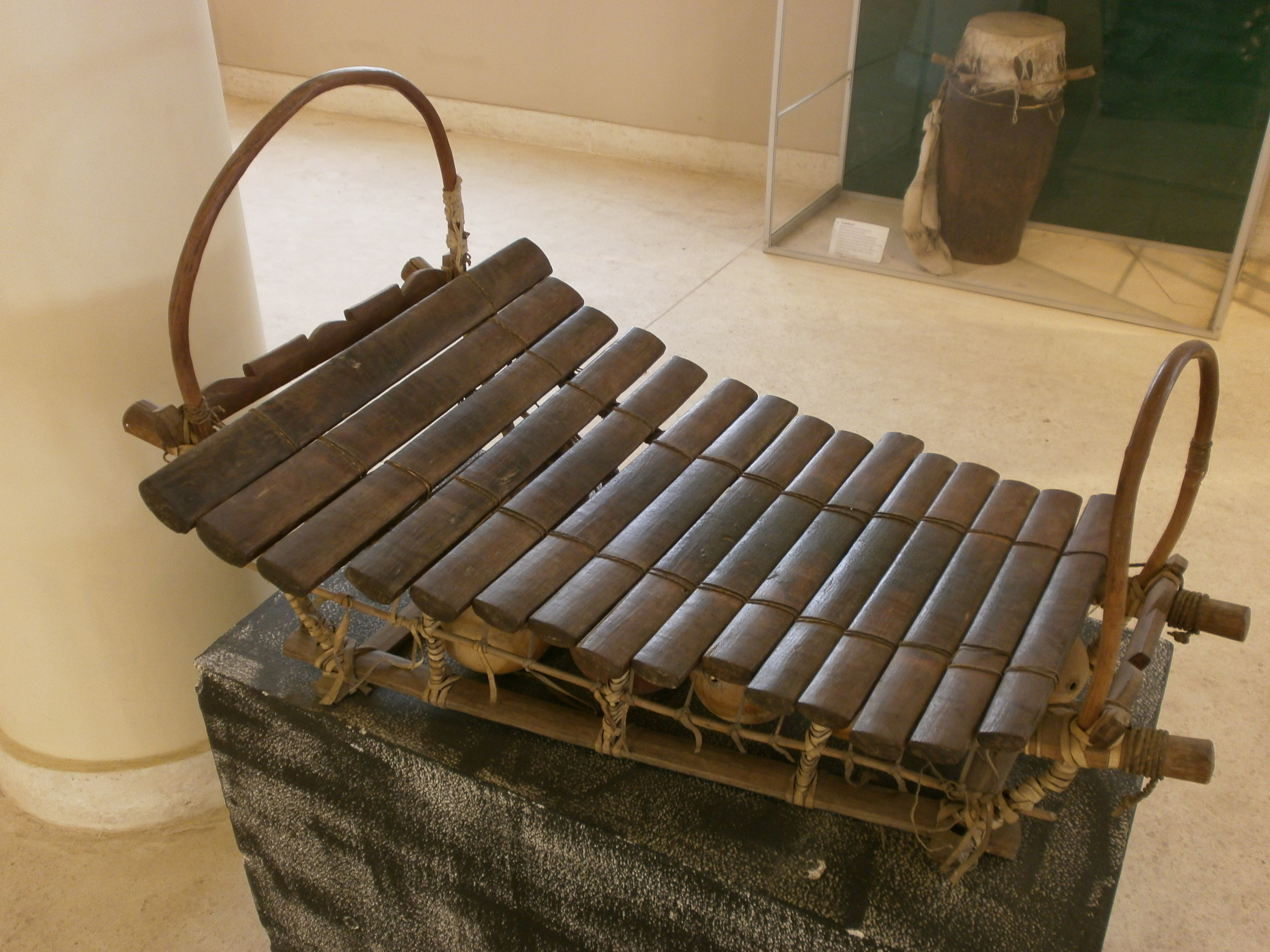
A Bwa xylophone.

After World War 2 the guitar became common throughout Africa, partially resulting from the mixing of African, American and British soldiers. Dance bands were popular in Mali, especially the town of Kita's orchestra led by Boureima Keita and Afro-Jazz de Ségou, the Rail Band and Pioneer Jazz. Imported dances were popular, especially rumbas, waltzes and Argentine-derived tangos. By the 1960s, however, the influence of Cuban music began to rise. After independence in 1960, Malians saw new opportunities for cultural expression in radio, television and recordings. Cuban music remained popular in Mali throughout the 1960s and remains popular today.

Old dance bands reformed under new names as part of the roots revival of Moussa Traoré. Especially influential bands included Tidiane Koné's Rail Band du Buffet Hôtel de la Gare, which launched the careers of future stars Salif Keita and Mory Kanté, and Super Biton de Ségou. Bajourou also became popular, beginning with Fanta Sacko's Fanta Sacko, the first bajourou LP. Fanta Sacko's success set the stage for future jelimusow stars which have been consistently popular in Mali; the mainstream acceptance of female singers is unusual in West Africa, and marks Malian music as unique. In 1975, Fanta Damba became the first jelimuso to tour Europe, as bajourou continued to become mainstream throughout Mali.

Not all bands took part in Traoré's roots revival. Les Ambassadeurs du Motel formed in 1971, playing popular songs imported from Senegal, Cuba and France. Les Ambassadeurs and Rail Band were the two biggest bands in the country, and a fierce rivalry developed. Salif Keita, perhaps the most popular singer of the time, defected to Les Ambassadeurs in 1972. This was followed by a major concert at which both bands performed as part of the Kibaru (literacy) program. The audience fell into a frenzy of excitement and unity, and the concert is still remembered as one of the defining moments in 1970s Malian music.

The mid-70s also saw the formation of National Badema, a band that played Cuban music and soon added Kassé Mady Diabaté who led a movement to incorporate Maninka praise-singing into Cuban-style music.

=== Exodus ===
Both the Rail Band and Les Ambassadeurs left for Abidjan at the end of the 1970s due to a poor economic climate in Mali. There, Les Ambassadeurs recorded Mandjou, an album which featured their most popular song, "Mandjou". The song helped make Salif Keita a solo star. Many of the biggest musicians of the period also emigrated—to Abidjan, Dakar, Paris (Salif Keita, Mory Kanté), London, New York or Chicago. Their recordings remained widely available, and these exiles helped bring international attention to Mande music.

=== 1980s ===
Les Ambassadeurs and Rail Band continued recording and performing under a variety of names. In 1982 Salif Keita, who had recorded with Les Ambassadeurs' Kanté Manfila, left the band and recorded an influential fusion album, Soro, with Ibrahima Sylla and French keyboardist Jean-Philippe Rykiel. The album revolutionized Malian pop, eliminating all Cuban traces and incorporating influences from rock and pop. By the middle of the decade, Paris had become the new capital of Mande dance music. Mory Kanté saw major mainstream success with techno-influenced Mande music, becoming a #1 hit on several European charts.

Another roots revival began in the mid-1980s. Guinean singer and kora player Jali Musa Jawara's 1983 Yasimika is said to have begun this trend, followed by a series of acoustic releases from Kanté Manfila and Kasse Mady. Ali Farka Touré also gained international popularity during this period; his music is less in the jeli tradition and resembles American blues.

=== Wassoulou ===
The region of Wassoulou, south of Bamako, became the centre of a new wave of dance music also referred to as wassoulou. Wassoulou had been developing since at least the mid-70s. Jeliw had never played a large part in the music scene there, and music was more democratic.

The modern form of wassoulou is a combination of hunter's songs with sogoninkun, a type of elaborate masked dance, and the music is largely based on the kamalengoni harp invented in the late 1950s by Allata Brulaye Sidibí. Most singers are women. Oumou Sangaré was the first major wassoulou star; she achieved fame suddenly in 1989 with the release of Moussoulou, both within Mali and international. The soku is a traditional Wassoulou single string fiddle, corresponding to the Songhai n'diaraka or njarka, that doubles the vocal melody.

Since the 1990s, although the majority of Malian popular singers are still jelimusow, wassoulou's popularity has continued to grow. Wassoulou music is especially popular among youth. Although western audiences categorise wassoulou performers like Oumou Sangaré as feminists for criticizing practices like polygamy and arranged marriage, within Mali they are not viewed in that light because their messages, when they do not support the status quo of gender roles, are subtly expressed and ambiguously worded, thus keeping them open to a variety of interpretations and avoiding direct censure from Malian society.

=== The impact of the 2012 Coup d’état on Malian Music ===
Music was outlawed in August 2012 by MUJAO as a direct result of the Malian Coup d’état. Most musicians in the North fled the country alongside an estimated 500,000 fellow Malians. An announcement from MUJAO spokesman, Osama Ould Abdel Kader justified the ban stating that “We do not want Satan’s music. In its place there will be Quranic verse. Shari’a demands this”. Islam is a fundamental part of Malian society, which is intertwined with music. Music which was deemed “Un Islamic” has been at the centre of religious life in Mali which arguably connected national and religious identity. Music has been an effective means of socialisation and cohesion in Malian society. Due to the imposition of the Salafist doctrine by Ansar Dine, which was incongruous with traditional Malikite Sunni Islam which makes up most of the majority if the Islamic population in Mali. The doctrine of Mali questioned morality, religion, and everyday life for Malians. The more radical form of Salafism in Mali was seen on May 5, 2012, when Ansar al-Din attacked the tomb of Islamic saints in Timbuktu which was highly condemned by the government who issued a statement on national television describing the act as “unspeakable in the name of Islam”. Islamists proceeded to violently enforce the ban of music on Malian musicians. Ahmed Ag Kaedi, a famed Tuareg guitarist received a threat that he would lose his fingers if he ever played guitar again. Islamists further destroyed his guitars, microphones, and amps by dousing them in petrol and setting them alight.

As a result of the conflict, Malian artists gained widespread attention to its music scene with artists such as the Songhoy Blues, gaining recognition from Julian Casablancas and Iggy Pop. The band as a direct result of the Coup d’etat had to go into exile however they continued to create music. The band collaborated with Iggy pop on the song ‘Sahara’ which featured on their critically acclaimed album ‘Résistance’. Featured on their album “Optimisme’, the song ‘Barre’ provides optimistic lyrics such as ‘Youth! Let’s rise or this change!”. Songhoy Blues Guitarist Aliou Touré stated that the track was about change and how it must be implemented in Mali and that the older generation must give space to the new generation. The Songhoy blues affirmed that the bands’ goal was to spread Malian culture in the form of music and to promote peace and unity.

Referring to North Mali, Vieux Farka Touré, son of the critically acclaimed guitarist Ali Farka Touré, stated “There's no music up there anymore. You can't switch on a radio or a TV, even at home." Malian Guitarist Anansy Cissé’s album ‘Anoura’ reached number 1 for May 2021 at the World Music charts for 2021. The album includes issues such as poverty, righteous conduct, and an indirect commentary on Mali’s parlous political situation. Anansy’s music implements Malian culture with the use of traditional instruments such as the ‘ngoni’ and ‘calabash’. In 2018 Cissé was to play at peace festival in his hometown of Diré, Timbuktu when he and his band were held captive and their musical instruments destroyed by an armed gang. The aftermath of 2012 is present in contemporary Malian music as musicians aim for artistic freedom and the promotion of peace and unity in Mali. Vieux Farka Touré has been quoted as saying that “Without music, Mali will cease to exist”. Musicians in Mali continue to create music even in the face of persecution and violence. Mali traditionally has been renowned for its musical roots especially by the “Desert blues” guitarist Ali Farka Touré. Post-2012, the musical prohibition of Mali has indirectly promoted Malian music by its exposure to western mainstream music.
