= Palais de la Culture Amadou Hampaté Ba =

Coordinates: 12.6243°N 7.9906°W

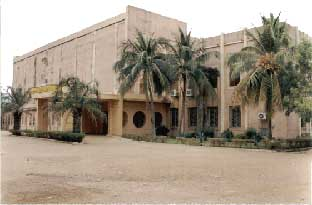
The main building at the Palais de la culture Amadou Hampaté Ba.

The Palais de la culture Amadou Hampaté Ba is the national performing arts centre for Mali, located in the capitol Bamako. Founded in 1976, the PCAHB is a public establishment, supported by the state for the preservation of traditional means of artistic expression. It is directed by the Direction Nationale des Arts et de la Culture of Mali, an arm of the Ministry of Culture, and is home to a number of Malian national institutions, including the Mali Centre of the International Theatre Institute, the National Theatre, the National Orchestra, the National Ballet Company, and the National Institute of the Arts. The current Palace of Culture was constructed in 1996. It is named for the famed Malian novelist and national hero Amadou Hampaté Ba. Its current director is Madame Haïdara Aminata Sy, named March 2008.

== Building ==
The Palais de la Culture resides in Bamako, Mali on right bank of the Niger River. It is in the neighborhood of Badalabougou SEMA, close to the Pont des Martyrs and spans three hectares, one of which is occupied by the building itself. It is accessible by the south by a paved road which links Bamako's two bridges: Pont des Martyrs and Pont du Roi FAHD. It is bordered to the north by the River Niger, to the south by a paved road which separates it from the neighborhood Badalabougou I, to the east by the Avenue de l’OUA, and to the west by open land.

=== Composition ===
- The central building which consists of the administration, a library, a conference room, and a workshop;
- La Salle Bazumana Sissoko, the venue for performing arts with 3300 seats;
- Halls for special exhibitions and shops to accommodate merchants;
- Lodging for artists;
- Garden which consists of a theater, pedestrian walkways, the gallery, and five artisanal workshops
- Two cultural spaces
1. les Cocotiers;
2. multimedia center;
- esplanade and playgrounds (pétanque, football, basketball court);
- Exposition village.

== Artistic Groups ==
The artistic groups at the Palais occupy 2/3 of the Palais de la Culture's personnel. There are four such groups.

1. KOTEBA National du Mali (the theater)
2. L’Ensemble Instrumental National (the national orchestra)
3. Les Ballets Malien (the ballet)
4. Le BADEMA National (orchestra)

== Events ==
As well as artistic events, the PCAHB also plays host to national and international gatherings. The PCAHB was one of the locations for the 2006 World Social Forum.
