= Fatou (album) =

Studio album by Fatoumata Diawara
- Released: September 19, 2011
- Studio: Livingston Studios, London and Popcorn Lab, Paris
- Genre: World music, Wassoulou, desert blues
- Length: 43:58
- Label: World Circuit

Fatoumata Diawara chronology
Fatou (2011)	Fenfo (Something To Say) (2018)

Professional ratings
Review scores
Source	Rating
The Guardian	4/5 stars
MusicOMH	4/5 stars
The Observer	4/5 stars
Pitchfork	7.6/10
PopMatters	8/10
Uncut	4/5 stars

Fatou is the debut album from Malian musician Fatoumata Diawara. Uncut placed the album at number 34 on its list of "Top 50 albums of 2011", The Sunday Times named it number 1 world music album in the 2011 end of year polls and WMCE voted it 2011 album of the year.

== Background ==
The album was recorded following a successful acting career and tours as a backing singer with Diawara's mentor Oumou Sangaré, who brought her to the attention of World Circuit Records and to whom the song, "Makoun Oumou" is dedicated. Sung in the Bambara language of Wassoulou and backing herself on guitar, Diawara explores themes of war, abandonment of children and female circumcision (Boloko) supported by contributions from West African virtuosi Tony Allen (drums) and Toumani Diabaté (kora) as well as Led Zeppelin bassist John Paul Jones.

== Track listing ==
All tracks are written by Fatoumata Diawara.

No.	Title	Length
1.	"Kanou"	3:53
2.	"Sowa"	3:07
3.	"Bakonoba"	3:15
4.	"Kèlè"	3:08
5.	"Makoun Oumou"	4:36
6.	"Sonkolon"	3:31
7.	"Alama"	3:35
8.	"Bissa"	3:05
9.	"Mousso"	3:18
10.	"Wililé"	4:50
11.	"Boloko"	3:34
12.	"Clandestin"	3:59
Total length:		43:58

== Personnel ==
- Fatoumata Diawara – vocals, guitar (all tracks except 2), shaker (tracks 1, 4–6, 11), calabash (track 1), udu (track 5)

Other credits

- Alioune Wade – bass guitar (tracks 1, 10, 12)
- Hilaire Penda – bass guitar (tracks 3, 5, 9, 11)
- John Paul Jones – bass guitar (track 6)
- Sola Akingbola – congas (tracks 4, 8, 9)
- Jon Grandcamp – drums (tracks 4, 10, 12)
- Sebastian Rochford – drums (tracks 2, 3, 5, 11)
- Tony Allen – drums (track 9)
- Moh! Kouyaté – electric guitar (tracks 3, 4, 6, 9, 11)
- Guimba Kouyaté – guitar (tracks 2, 10, 12), ngoni (tracks 5, 6, 11)
- Ousmane Keita – ngoni (track 1)
- Boris Persikoff – keyboards (track 1)
- Madou Kone – calabash (track 4)
- Toumani Diabaté – kora (track 10)

Technical

- Fatoumata Diawara, Nick Gold – production
- Guy Davie – mastering
- Bernie Grundman, Jerry Boys, Tom Leader, Tony Cousins – additional mastering
- Marc Loisel – recording
- Boris Persikoff, Christophe Marais, Lucas Chauviere – additional recording
- Dan Ingall – engineering
