= The Rough Guide to West African Music =

Compilation album by Various artists
- Released: 21 November 1995
- Genre: World, West African music
- Length: 70:42
- Label: World Music Network

Full series chronology
The Rough Guide to World Music (1994)	The Rough Guide to West African Music (1995)	Global Partnership II (1995)

The Rough Guide to West African Music is a world music compilation album originally released in 1995. The second release of the World Music Network Rough Guides series, it largely focuses on Malian music, with six of the twelve tracks coming from that country. This is followed by Senegal (two tracks), and Guinea, Niger, Ghana, and Mauritania (one track each). The compilation was produced by Phil Stanton, co-founder of the World Music Network.

Chris Nickson of AllMusic gave the album four stars, but lamented the broadness of the topic, stating "the real problem with this album isn't the music, which is glorious throughout, but the fact that it suffers from the size of its ambition and the inability to fully realize it." Michaelangelo Matos, writing for the Chicago Reader, praised the record's focus on slow to midtempo music, stating it "succeeds in sustaining a meditative, inner-gazing mood."

== Track listing ==
No.	Title	Artist (Country)	Length
1.	"Foliba"	Super Rail Band (Mali)	7:51
2.	"Djelika"	Toumani Diabaté (Mali)	7:14
3.	"Roucky"	Ali Farka Touré (Mali)	8:18
4.	"Toro"	Moussa Poussy (Niger)	4:44
5.	"M'Bore"	Sona Diabate (Guinea)	6:09
6.	"Djama Kaissoumou"	Oumou Sangare (Mali)	6:46
7.	"I Ka Di Nye"	Bajourou (Mali)	5:19
8.	"205"	E.T. Mensah (Ghana)	3:05
9.	"Utru Horas"	Orchestra Baobab (Senegal)	8:41
10.	"Almamy Bocoum"	Mansour Seck (Senegal)	4:57
11.	"Mauritania My Beloved Country"	Dimi Mint Abba & Khalifa Ould Eide (Mauritania)	3:32
12.	"Agne Anko"	Kante Manfila (Guinea)	4:37

Professional ratings
Review scores
Source	Rating
Allmusic	4/5 stars
