= Fatoumata Diawara =

Malian singer-songwriter (born 1982)

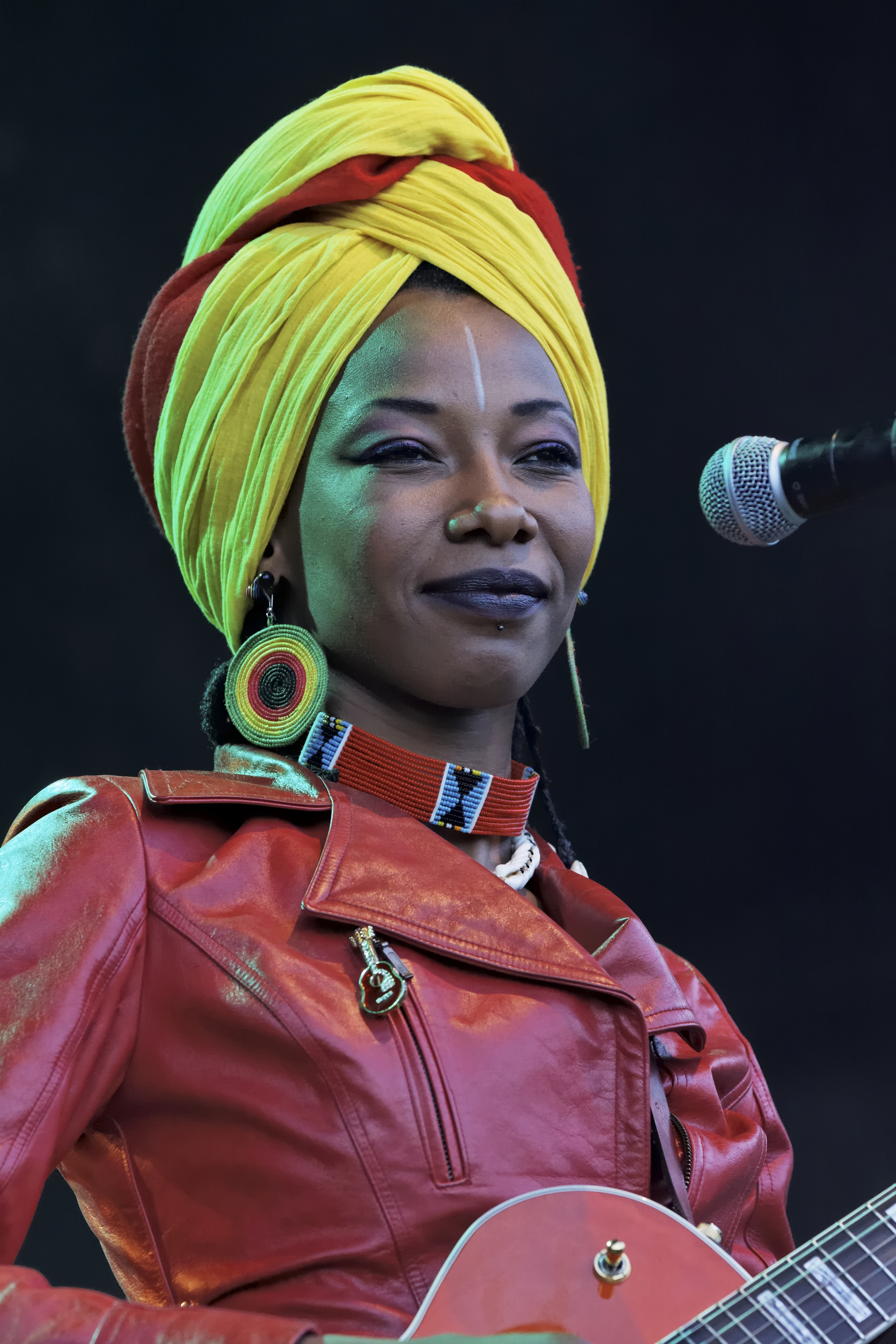
- Diawara performing in 2012

Background information
- Born: 21 February 1982 (age 44); Ouragahio, Ivory Coast
- Origin: Mali
- Genres: Folk; Wassoulou; Mali blues
- Occupations: Musician, actress
- Instruments: Vocals; guitar
- Years active: 1996–present
- Labels: World Circuit; Nonesuch
- Member of: Lamomali
- Website: fatoumatadiawara.com

Fatoumata Diawara (Bambara: ߝߊ߫ߕߎߡߕߊ ߖߊ߯ߥߙߊ߫, romanized: Fatumta Jawara, born 21 February 1982) is a Malian singer-songwriter and actress currently living in France.

Diawara began her career as an actress in theatre and in film, including Genesis (1999), Sia, The Dream of the Python (2001) and Timbuktu (2014). She later launched a career in music, collaborating with numerous artists and releasing three studio albums beginning with 2011 debut Fatou. Diawara's music combines traditional Wassoulou with international styles.

== Early life ==
Diawara was born in 1982 in the Ivory Coast to Malian parents. As an adolescent, she was sent back to their native Bamako in Mali to be raised by an aunt. When she was eighteen, Diawara moved to France to pursue acting. She briefly returned to Mali for a film role, but fled back to Paris to avoid being coerced into marriage by her family.

== Film and theatre ==
After moving to France, Diawara appeared in Cheick Oumar Sissoko's 1999 feature film Genesis, Dani Kouyaté's popular 2001 film Sia, le rêve du python, and in the internationally renowned street theatre troupe Royal de Luxe. She also played a leading role in the stage adaptation of the musical Kirikou et Karaba.

Simultaneously with pursuing her musical career, Diawara has continued her cinematic activities, with numerous roles, appearances, and musical input in multiple feature films, including in Timbuktu, which won seven César Award nods and an Academy Award nomination in 2014.

== Musical career ==
Diawara took up the guitar and began composing her own material, writing songs that blend Wassoulou traditions of southern Mali with international influences. She has said that she is "the first female solo electric guitar player in Mali".

Diawara has performed or recorded with Malian and international stars such as Cheick Tidiane Seck, Oumou Sangaré, AfroCubism, Dee Dee Bridgewater (on Red Earth: A Malian Journey), and the Orchestre Poly Rythmo de Cotonou. The EP Kanou was released 9 May 2011. She wrote every song on her debut album Fatou from World Circuit Records that released in September 2011. (Nonesuch Records released the Kanou EP digitally in North America on 27 September 2011, and the album Fatou on 28 August 2012).

In September 2012, Diawara was featured in a campaign called "30 Songs / 30 Days" to support Half the Sky, a multi-platform media project inspired by Nicholas Kristof and Sheryl WuDunn's book. September 2012 also saw her board the Africa Express Train with Damon Albarn, Rokia Traoré, Baaba Maal, Amadou & Mariam, Nicolas Jaar, and the Noisettes, amongst many others. The show culminated in a 4.5k venue in Kings Cross where Fatoumata performed with Paul McCartney.

Diawara has spent recent years touring the world, with a landmark performance for the English-speaking public at the 2013 Glastonbury Festival. Alongside many European gigs, her schedule has taken her to South America, Asia and Australia, as well as on multiple trips to the US, where in September 2013 she performed as part of the Clinton Global Initiative alongside The Roots in New York. Since mid-2014 she has collaborated with Roberto Fonseca, with numerous live performances and a joint live album, At Home - Live in Marciac, along the way. In 2014 she also performed with Mayra Andrade and Omara Portuondo. February 2015 saw her first live concert as an established international star in Mali, her home country, Festival sur le Niger in Ségou, where she shared the stage once again with her long-time friend and mentor, Oumou Sangaré, Bassekou Kouyate, and many other domestic Malian acts.

Diawara was featured in the 2020 Gorillaz single "Désolé", which later appeared on their album Song Machine, Season One: Strange Timez. She performed a Tiny Desk home concert in February 2022. Later that year, she published the album Maliba, created as a soundtrack for a Google Arts and Culture project to digitise manuscripts held in Timbuktu. The album was characterised by The Economist as "a wondrous work of cultural preservation from one of the biggest names in contemporary African music".

=== Style ===
Noted for her "sensuous voice," Diawara sings primarily in Bambara, the national language of Mali, and builds on the tradition of "songs of advice" from the culture of her ancestral Wassoulou region. In her songs, Diawara has addressed issues such as the pain of emigration; a need for mutual respect; the struggles of African women; life under the rule of religious fundamentalists, and the practice of female circumcision. One song that exemplifies her focus on these topics is "Mali-ko (Peace/La Paix)", a seven-minute song and video that criticises the fundamentalist conquest of Northern Mali and urges unity to quell resentment against the Tuareg minority whom some blamed for abetting the incursion. Diawara said about the song, ""I needed to scream with this song, 'Wake up! We are losing Mali! We are losing our culture, our tradition, our origins, our roots!'".

== Recognition and awards ==
She received two nominations at the 61st Annual Grammy Awards for Best World Music Album for her album Fenfo and Best Dance Recording for "Ultimatum" in which she was featured with the English band Disclosure.

== Filmography ==
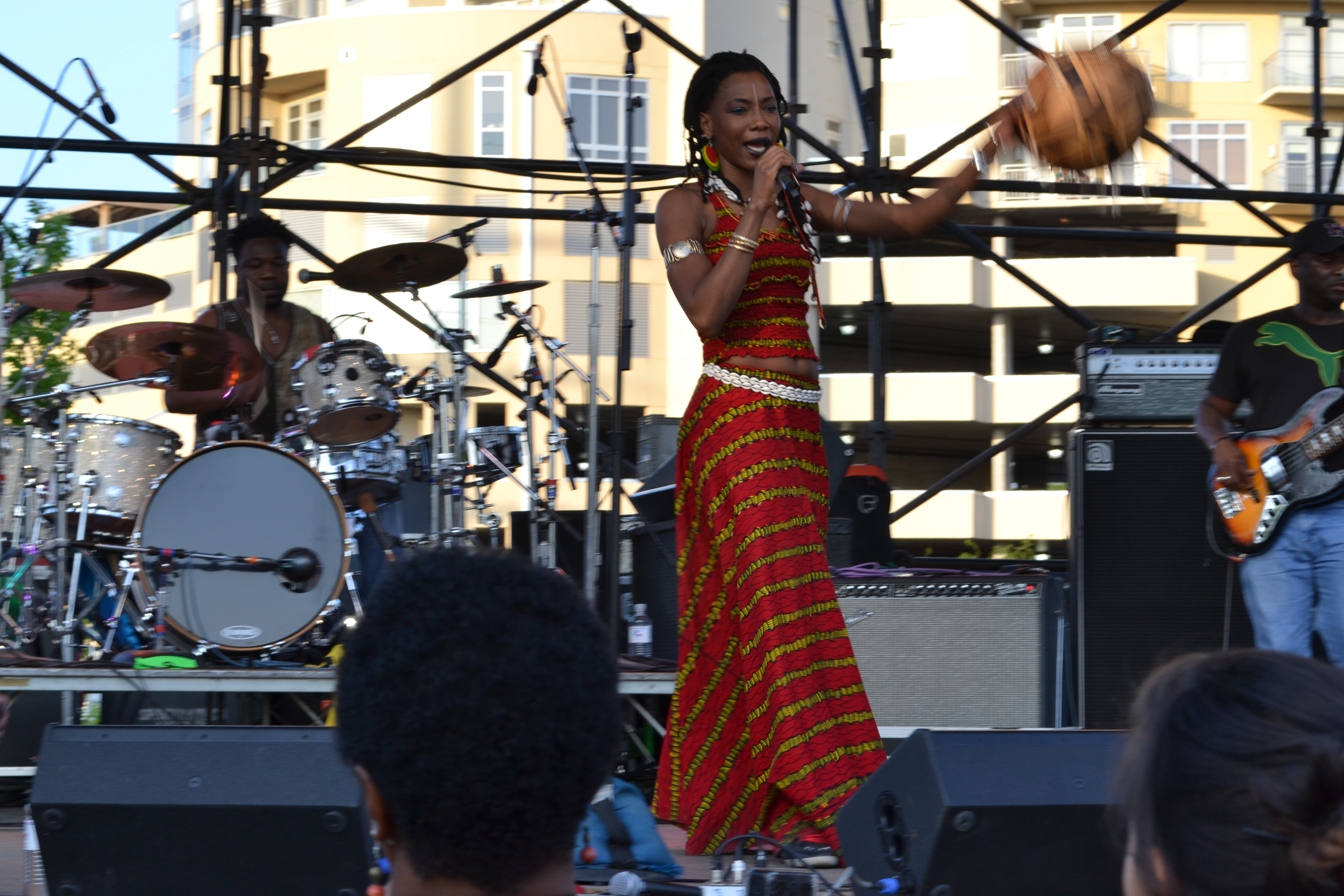
Fatoumata Diawara band performing at the World Beat Music festival. Austin, Texas, 2013

- 1996: Taafe Fanga by Adama Drabo
- 1999: La Genèse by Cheick Oumar Sissoko: Dina
- 2002: Sia, le rêve du python by Dani Kouyaté: Sia
- 2008: Il va pleuvoir sur Conakry, by Cheick Fantamady Camara: Siré
- 2010: Encourage, by Eleonora Campanella
- 2010: Ni brune ni blonde, by Abderrahmane Sissako
- 2011: Les Contes de la Nuit, by Michel Ocelot (voice)
- 2013: The Africa Express, by Renaud Barret and Florent de La Tulle: Herself
- 2014: Timbuktu (Le chagrin des oiseaux), by Abderrahmane Sissako
- 2015: Morbayassa, by Cheick Fantamady Camara: Bella
- 2016: Mali Blues, by Lutz Gregor: Herself
- 2019: Yao, by Philippe Godeau: Gloria

== Stage performances ==
- 1998: Antigone by Sophocles; adapted by Jean-Louis Sagot Duvauroux, production Sotiguy Kouyaté
- 2002–2008: Royal de Luxe; creator Jean-Luc Courcoult
- 2007–2008: Kirikou et Karaba: Karaba

== Discography ==
=== Albums ===
- 2011: Fatou (World Circuit/Nonesuch)
- 2015: At Home - Live in Marciac, Fatoumata Diawara & Roberto Fonseca (Jazz Village)
- 2018: Fenfo (Something to Say) (Wagram Music/Shanachie Records)
- 2022: Maliba ("Mali Magic" Soundtrack on Google Arts and Culture) (3ème Bureau/Wagram Music)
- 2023: London Ko (3ème Bureau/Wagram Music)
- 2026: Massa (No Format!)

=== Singles and EPs ===
- 2011: Kanou EP (World Circuit/Nonesuch)

=== Collaborations ===
- 2009: Featured in the album Léman by Blick Bassy
- 2010: Co-authoring and featuring in the album Debademba by Debademba
- 2010: Featured in The Imagine Project by Herbie Hancock
- 2010: Featured in the album Jamm by Cheikh Lô
- 2010: Featured in the song "N'fletoun" from the Djekpa La You album by Dobet Gnahoré
- 2011: Featured in the song "C'est lui ou c'est moi" from the Cotonou Club album by Orchestre Poly-Rythmo de Cotonou
- 2012: Featured in Rocket Juice & the Moon (Honest Jon's - Album)
- 2012: Featured in the song "Bibisa" from the album Yo by Roberto Fonseca
- 2012: Featured in the song "Nothin' Can Save Ya" from the album The Bravest Man In The Universe by Bobby Womack
- 2013: Featured in the song "Surma" from the Sketches of Ethiopia album by Mulatu Astatke
- 2014: Co-authoring and featured in the song "Timbuktu Fasso" from the Timbuktu soundtrack by Amine Bouhafa
- 2014: Featured in the song "It's all coming together" by Walter Hus from the soundtrack to feature film N - The Madness of Reason by Peter Krüger
- 2018: Featured in the song "Ultimatum" by Disclosure
- 2019: Featured in the song "Cameroon" by Bonaparte (singer)
- 2020: Featured in the song "Désolé" by Gorillaz
- 2020: Featured in the song "Douha (Mali Mali)" by Disclosure
- 2021: Featured in the song "Black Woman" with Lauryn Hill, from the soundtrack to The Harder They Fall
- 2022: Featured in the song 'Tama' with Barbara Pravi

=== with Les blayeurs du désert ===
Via association with Royal de Luxe; several of the songs had been played as accompaniment in Royal de Luxe's 'giant marionettes' street performances throughout the world.

- 2005: Jules Verne Impact by Les Balayeurs du désert (apast – Album) (Y Danse, Hamleti...)
- 2007: La Pequeña by Les Balayeurs du désert (Atelier de l'événement – Album) (with an early version of Salimata)

== Awards and nominations ==
Award Ceremony	Year	Work	Category	Result
Berlin Music Video Awards	2023	Nsera	Best Art Director	Win
