= Djelimady Tounkara =

- Born: Kita, Mali
- Occupation: Guitarist
- Instrument: Guitar
- Years active: 1960s-present
- Labels: Label Bleu, Marabi Productions
- Formerly of: Rail Band

Djelimady Tounkara is a Malian musician and one of the foremost guitarists in Africa.

== Life and career ==
Born in the culturally rich town of Kita, west of the Malian capital, Bamako, Djelimady grew up surrounded with traditional music played by members of his family, griots, musicians and historians by birth. Djelimady played djembe drum and ngoni, a banjo-like lute, as a boy. When he moved to Mali's capital, Bamako, during the 1960s, he had actually planned to work as a tailor. But music proved a stronger calling. He started playing guitar in a large, government-sponsored neighborhood band, Orchestre Misira. Voted the best guitarist in the band, Djelimady was selected to join the Orchestre National as rhythm guitarist, a great honor for the young player.

All his adult life, Djelimady has worked to transform his ancestral traditions into dance pop. But at the same time, he has continued to work in more traditional contexts, backing the great griot singers of Mali on records, in concerts and at the day-long wedding and baptism celebrations that are the modern griot's life blood. In recent years, Djelimady has performed in an acoustic trio called Bajourou, accompanied by another masterful griot guitarist, Bouba Sacko, and by singer Lafia Diabate, a veteran of the Rail Band.

In 2001, he has won the BBC Radio 3 music award in World Music - "Africa" category for his album titled Sigui.

In 2002, Djelimady collaborated on a track with rapper Common for the Red Hot Organization's compilation album Red Hot and Riot in tribute to the Nigerian afropop innovator, Fela Kuti. He also features on Béla Fleck's album Tales from the Acoustic Planet, Vol. 3: Africa Sessions (also known as Throw Down Your Heart). Tounkara plays a prominent role in the book In Griot Time by American musician and author Banning Eyre.

== See also ==
- African fingerstyle guitar
