= Tata Bambo Kouyaté =

Malian singer (died 2021)

- Born: Fatoumata Kouyaté c. 1950; Bamako
- Died: June 14, 2021 (aged 70–71)
- Occupation: Singer
- Parent(s): Djeliba Kouyaté

Tata "Bambo" Kouyaté (c. 1950 – 14 June 2021) was a Malian singer, one of the most famous in the country.

She was born Fatoumata Kouyaté circa 1950 in Bamako, the daughter of n'goni musician Djéliba Kouyaté. She was part of an extended family of traditional jali musicians. While only 12 years old, she wrote her first hit song in 1962, "Bambo," which earned her her nickname. The song denounced forced marriages and celebrated recent reforms outlawing forced and child marriage in Mali. In the 1960s she joined the Mali Instrumental Ensemble and accompanied them to the 1967 Algiers Pan-African Music Festival.

Her solo career began in 1978 and she toured the continent and the world. She released two albums which mixed traditional and contemporary music. The second, Jatigui (1984), was originally recorded in 1984 in Paris and contained her biggest hit, "Hommage à Baba Cissoko," a tribute to her patron Babani Cissoko.

Tata Bambo Kouyaté died on 14 June 2021.

== Discography ==
- Djely Mousoo (Syllart SYL 8360, 1988)
- Jatigui (Globestyle ORB 842, 1989)
