= Khaira Arby =

Malian singer (1959–2018)

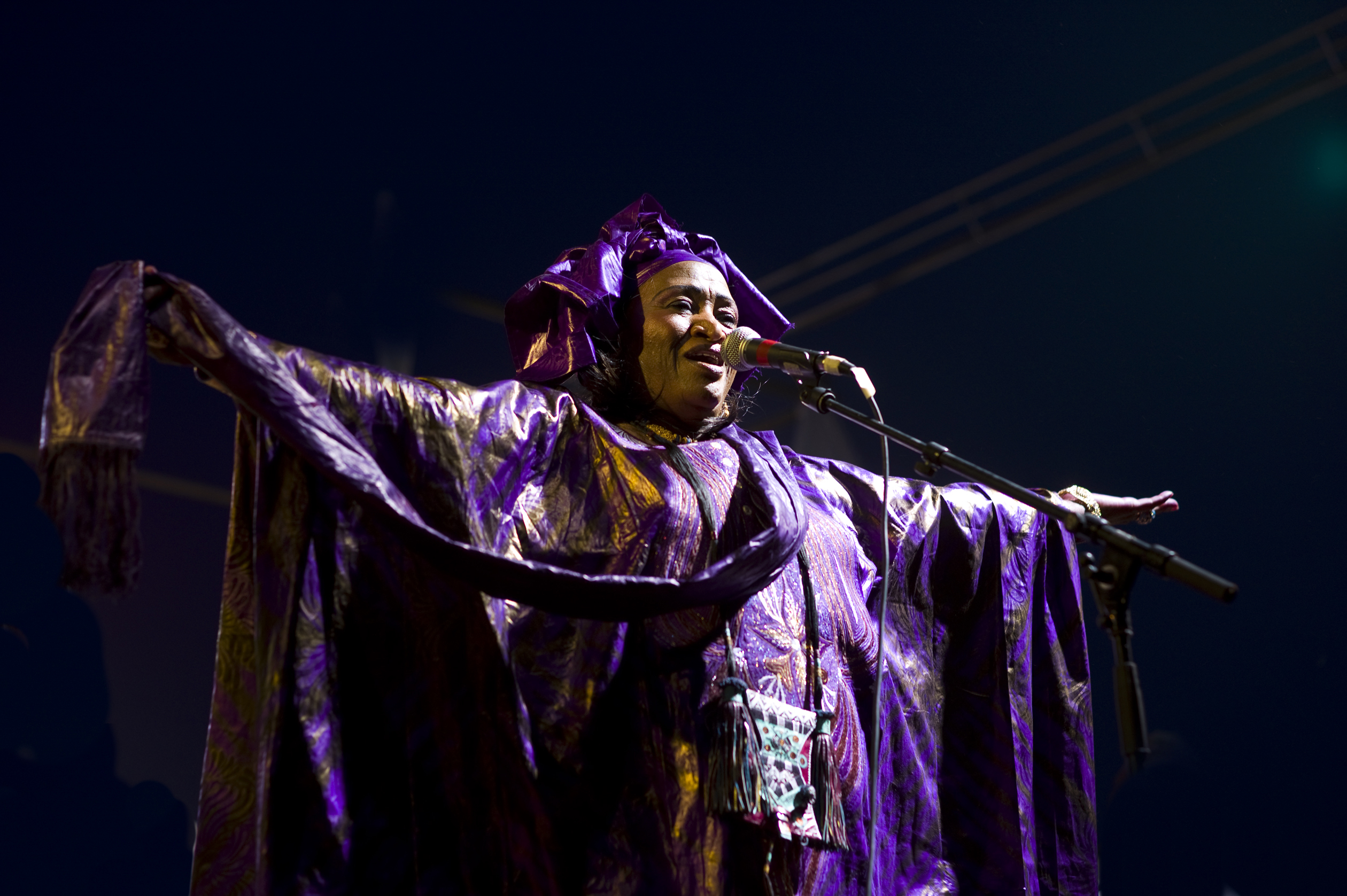
- In 2012

Background information
- Born: 21 September 1959; Timbuktu, Mali Federation
- Died: 19 August 2018 (aged 58) Bamako, Mali
- Occupation: Traditional Malian singer
- Instrument: Vocals

Khaira Arby, known as The Nightingale of Timbuktu (21 September 1959 – 19 August 2018), was a Malian singer.

== Early life ==
Arby was the daughter of a Tuareg father and a Songhai mother. She began singing at a young age for weddings and traditional festivals, and at the age of eleven, began singing in a musical troupe from the city of Timbuktu. During the presidency of Moussa Traoré, cultural policy safeguarded and developed traditional Malian culture.

Arby left Timbuktu to join the artistic troupe of Gao, a town 400 km to the east. Her father and her husband tried to make her give up her artistic career, but she resumed musical activity in the group Badema National after a break. Arby divorced her reluctant husband and remarried later.

== Career ==
In 1992, Arby started a career under her own name, the first Malian woman to do so. In 2010, she gained recognition beyond Mali and her music received a favorable reception in North America. She toured the United States and performed at Pop Montreal in 2010 and the Montreal International Jazz Festival in 2011.

In 2012, jihadists, with the help of Tuareg ex-mercenaries returning from Libya, invaded northern Mali and seized the Sahel. Arby took exile, settling temporarily in Bamako. In Timbuktu, jihadists threatened her family and destroyed her instruments. Three years later, in 2015, she returned to Timbuktu. She said "Our religion has never banned music. The Prophet was greeted with songs when he arrived in Mecca. Cutting music is like keeping us from breathing. But we keep fighting, and it's going to go, inch'Allah."

== Works ==
Arby wrote and sang in the indigenous languages of the region: Songhai, Tamachek, Bambara and Arabic. She had a scratchy voice. Her words addressed sensitive issues. While Tuareg rebellions followed one another in 1990–1996, 2006, and 2007–2009, she advocated peace. She sang about the rights of women to autonomy, training, happiness and fulfillment, and also against female genital mutilation. Musically, she mixed traditional instrumentation, using for example n'goni, njarka and drums with electric instrumentation.

== Death ==
Arby died on August 19, 2018, in a hospital in Bamako. Her son said she had been treated for heart problems.
