= Jama Ko =

2013 studio album by Bassekou Kouyate & Ngoni Ba

Studio album by Bassekou Kouyate & Ngoni Ba
- Released: 2 April 2013
- Genre: International
- Length: 57:55
- Label: Out Here Records

Bassekou Kouyate & Ngoni Ba chronology
| I Speak Fula (2009) | Jama Ko (2013) | Ba Power (2015) |

Singles from Jama Ko
- 1. "Jama Ko" Released: 22 October 2012

Professional ratings
Aggregate scores
| Source | Rating |
|---|---|
| Metacritic | 90/100 |
Review scores
| Source | Rating |
| The Arts Desk | 5/5 stars |
| Exclaim! | 9/10 |
| The Guardian | 4/5 stars |
| The Independent | 5/5 stars |
| MSN Music (Expert Witness) | A |
| Record Collector | 4/5 stars |
| Sputnikmusic | 3.5/5 |
| Tom Hull | A− |

Jama Ko is the third studio album by Malian musician Bassekou Kouyate and his band Ngoni Ba. It was released in April 2013 by Out Here Records.

The first single, "Jama Ko", came out on 22 October 2012.

== Track listing ==
| No. | Title | Length |
|---|---|---|
| 1. | "Jama Ko" | 4:39 |
| 2. | "Sinaly" (featuring Kassé Mady Diabaté) | 3:37 |
| 3. | "Dankou" (featuring Zoumana Tereta) | 3:48 |
| 4. | "Ne Me Fatigue Pas" | 3:48 |
| 5. | "Kele Magni" (featuring Khaira Arby) | 3:54 |
| 6. | "Madou" | 3:44 |
| 7. | "Kensogni" (featuring Zoumana Tereta) | 4:24 |
| 8. | "Mali Koori" (featuring Zoumana Tereta) | 7:09 |
| 9. | "Wagadou" (featuring Moussa Bah, Fousseyni Kouyate, Barou Kouyaté, Dominic "Mocky" Salole, Alou Sangaré, Moussa Sissoko) | 5:31 |
| 10. | "Djadje" | 3:07 |
| 11. | "Segu Jajiri" | 5:30 |
| 12. | "Poye 2" (featuring Moussa Bah, M. Dadi Kouyate, Taj Mahal, Dominic "Mocky" Salole, Alou Sangaré) | 6:04 |
| 13. | "Moustafa" | 2:40 |
