= Kandia Kouyaté =

Malian musician, singer, and jelimuso

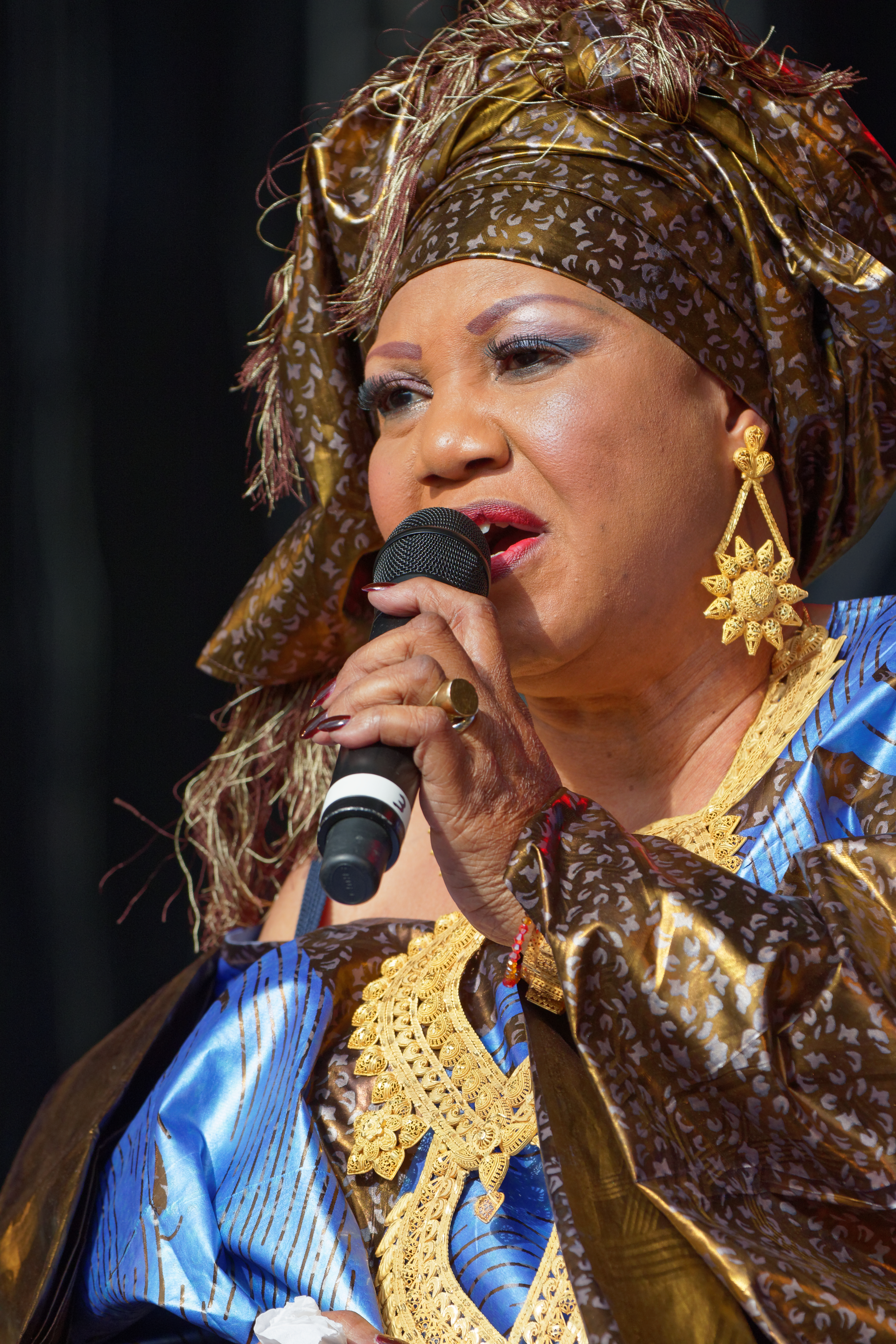
- Kouyaté in concert.

Background information
- Also known as: Kandja Kouyaté
- Born: 1959 (age 66–67); Kita, Mali
- Instrument: Kora

Kandia Kouyaté (also known as Kandja Kouyaté, born in 1959 in Kita, Mali) is a Malian jelimuso (a female griot) and kora player; she has earned the prestigious title of ngara, and is sometimes called La dangereuse and La Grande vedette malienne. Kouyaté's dense, emotional, hypnotic manner of singing and her lyrical talents have earned huge acclaim in Mali, though she remained relatively little known outside Africa, due to extremely limited availability of her recordings. Her home town of Kita is known for love songs, which form a large part of Kouyaté's repertoire. She also sings praise songs.

== Background ==
Kouyaté's father, a balafon (West African xylophone) player himself, did not want her to go into music and wanted her to rely on a solid education instead of the unpredictability of a musical career. Secretly, she learned from her mother and other family members how to sing and began performing occasionally at private gatherings. As a young girl, she began singing with her uncle Mady Sylla Kouyaté in his popular dance band, The Apollos, in Bamako.

Kouyaté's journey with The Apollos began when she was 16 years old. While still in school, her father fell ill and could no longer work, leaving the family struggling to make ends meet. In an effort to support them, Kouyaté joined the group. The Apollos' unique sound blended traditional, contemporary, local, and international influences, offering her the opportunity to not only help her family but also showcase her powerful contralto voice. Her unique sound brought an added depth to the group's music, helping to elevate their popularity and broaden their appeal.

== Career ==
Kouyaté's solo career began in the early 1980s. She used "female choral vocals accompanying her," in the background of her performances. The practice was later picked up by stars like Mory Kante and Salif Keita, and is now an "integral part of Malian music." Kouyaté lofted the band's popularity, drawing the interests of the most important musicians and patrons of the city. Back in Bamako, she was pursued by wealthy businessman Amary Daou who gave her large amounts of money and cars as gifts. He later produced Kouyaté's second album Balassama / Sarama (1983). She released another vinyl discs Kandja Kouyaté et L’Ensemble Instrumental National du Mali the same year.

As her reputation spread around West Africa, her music attracted many rewards for public and private appearances. Wealthy patrons such as Foutanga Babani Sissoko showered her with money, a car, and even a small airplane, indicating her popularity in Mali. Outside of Mali, she was not well known due to refusing to make a CD recording for a long time. It is almost two decades after the start of her career that her voice and talents would be showcased for an international audience.

Preferring to sing only for private and public events, Kouyaté did not make studio recordings. Instead, she released cassette locales. Differing from published music cassettes and other commercial recordings, cassette locales are one-off recordings of a performance that happen in the moment. According to Lucy Durán the cassette locale "is one way in which a jeli [griot] can seek out new patrons or enhance existing relationships with patrons." Cassette locales are not made for the market, but many copies end up there such as Kouyaté's Moyomba which was recorded during a 1980 performance in Abidjan, Côte d'Ivoire. Kouyaté made four cassette locales which, while popular in Mali, went unheard outside of West Africa. Many record companies were eager to sign her, but she rejected all offers.

One of Kouyaté's most passionate fans was record producer Ibrahima Sylla, who urged her to give him the opportunity to make an album with her. She frequently declined, but he persisted. After years, Kouyaté gave in and her debut solo album Kita Kan (Sterns 1999) was released internationally in 1999. Her following album, Biriko (Sterns 2002) was released in 2002; both for Sterns Africa.

Kandia Kouyaté toured Europe in 1999 alongside Guinean singers Sekouba Bambino & Oumou Diabate and with a 12 piece West African ensemble that included kora, djembe, ngoni, balafon, bass, keyboards, backing vocals and percussion. The tour named as 'The Griot Groove Tour' included concerts in Germany, Austria, Norway, Sweden and the United Kingdom.

In 2003, Kandia Kouyate toured Ireland, spreading her music, and officially launcing the FeileAfrica Movement in Cork City. The movement was a project to foster greater understanding, appreciation and integration of African culture in the Irish society. Kouyate noticed that there was a large African dispora in Ireland and sought to create a festival that was deeply committed to celebrating African heritage and fostering cross-cultural dialogue.

== Personal life ==
Kandia Kouyaté suffered a stroke in late 2004. Her recovery was slow and challenging as she hardly spoke and did not sing at all. Many thought she was never going to sing again. In 2011, producer Ibrahima Sylla, whose health was also declining, visited Kouyaté at her home in Bamako and convinced her to return to the recording studio. Sylla died in December 2013 and did not live to complete the album, but with the help of François Bréant, who had worked with him on big records such as Salif Keita's Soro (Sterns 1987) and Thione Seck's Orientation (Sterns 2005), and Sylla's daughter Binetou, the project Renascence was completed in 2015. Kandia Kouyaté's latest album embodies its title. "Renascence," her first release since experiencing her stroke in 2004, signifies a revival of both her career and her unique sound, which stands out in West African music.

== Discography ==
- Mayomba (1980, local cassette release)
- Balassama / Sarama (1983, LP, produced by Amary Daou)
- Kandja Kouyaté et L’Ensemble Instrumental National du Mali (1983, LP)
- OUA 84 (1984, local cassette release)
- Projet Dabia (1987, local cassette release)
- Sa Kunu Sa (1994, local cassette release)
- Woulalé (1998, CD, Syllart Records)
- Kita Kan (1999, CD, Stern's STCD 1088)
- Biriko (2002, CD, Stern's STCD 1095)
- Ngara (2009, compilation tracks 1999/1984/1981)
- Symphonie Mandingue au Daniel Sorano a Dakar (2011, CD, Elite Production, BP2143)
- Renaissance, (2015)
