= Sidiki Dembélé =

Musician and multi-instrumentalist from the Ivory Coast

- Born: Abidjan, Ivory Coast
- Occupation: Musician
- Years active: 2008–present

Sidiki Dembélé is a musician and multi-instrumentalist from the Ivory Coast. In 2015, he released a studio album, Nyangy, and in 2024, he performed at the Edinburgh International Festival; The Scotsman called him a "master of African percussion."

== Early life ==
Born and raised in Abidjan of the Ivory Coast, Dembélé is from a family of griots, or storytellers and musicians from West Africa. His parents are specifically from both the Ivory Coast and Mali. The first instrument he learned to play was the djembe, after which he learned the jeli ngoni, the kamale ngoni, the cabasa, and the talking drum, among other instruments.

In 2008, Dembélé moved to the United Kingdom to perform music with a touring group, after which he began touring alone. In 2014, he performed on The Brothers Tour with several other artists, after which he—as Sidiki Dembélé & Friends—released an album, Nyangy, with profits going to the Denifari School, a music school in Abidjan.
