= Pioneer Jazz =

Malian jazz band

Pioneer Jazz was a Malian band from the 1960s. The band emerged from the city of Bamako after Modibo Keïta, the Malian leader, began subsidizing musical groups as long as they used indigenous praise song, and the kora and balafon musical instruments, in their music. Pioneer Jazz became very popular, and contributed musicians who went on to join other renowned Malian bands. Perhaps the most prominent member of Pioneer Jazz was guitarist Djelimady Tounkara, who later joined the Rail Band.
