= Ko Sira =

Studio album by Oumou Sangare
- Released: 1993
- Genre: Wassalou
- Labels: World Circuit/Rounder; Nonesuch
- Producers: Nick Gold, Massambou Welle Diallo

Oumou Sangare chronology
Moussoulou (1990)	Ko Sira (1993)	"Worotan" (1996)

Ko Sira is an album by the Malian wassalou singer Oumou Sangaré, released in 1993. It was originally issued independently as Bi Furu.

The album was a commercial success in Europe, spending months on the world music charts.

== Production ==
Written by Sangare, the album was recorded in Berlin. It was produced by Nick Gold and Massambou Welle Diallo. Like much of Sangare's work, Ko Sira explores feminist themes. The album title translates to "Marriage Today". "Sigi Kuruni" is about the possibility of spousal abuse in a new marriage.

== Critical reception ==
Professional ratings
Review scores
Source	Rating
AllMusic	4/5 stars
Robert Christgau	B+
The Encyclopedia of Popular Music	3/5 stars

The New York Times thought that, "even on her calmest numbers, Ms. Sangare quickens beats and tickles locutions, impatient to cram more sensations into her singing, and her hunger for excitement is infectious ... [her] two-woman chorus adds to her sensuous swing, giving her abrupt interjections the kick of blues shouts." Guitar Player called Sangare "sublime," writing that she "spins her heartbreakingly beautiful melodies over interlocking webs of guitar, electric bass, and indigenous stringed instruments." The Atlanta Journal-Constitution said that "her lovely voice levitates over a pulsing musical hybrid."

Reviewing the Nonesuch reissue, The Washington Post wrote: "Sangare forgoes international pop, rock and disco influences for a small-combo acoustic sound. Yet her supple music is not strictly traditional; Western guitar, bass and violin intertwine with African percussion and call-and-response vocals." The San Diego Union-Tribune deemed Ko Sira "enchanting," writing that "the focal point remains [Sangare's] high, keening, soulful singing, which is steeped in tradition yet very much of the moment."

AllMusic wrote that "the focus remains on Sangare's gliding singing (thickened by a couple of female backup singers) and the music's looping (but not laid-back) grooves."

== Track listing ==
All tracks are written by Oumou Sangare.

No.	Title	Length
1.	"Kayini Wura"
2.	"Sigi Kuruni"
3.	"Mani Djindala"
4.	"Saa Magni"
5.	"Dugu Kamelemba"
6.	"Bi Furu"
7.	"Nawo Nawo"
8.	"Ko Sira"
