= Rail Band =

Malian band formed in 1970

- Also known as: Super Rail Band; Bamako Rail Band; Super Rail Band of the Buffet Hotel de la Gare, Bamako
- Origin: Mali
- Years active: 1970–present
- Past members: Salif Keita; Djelimady Tounkara; Mory Kanté (deceased)

The Rail Band is a Malian band formed in 1970; it was later known as Super Rail Band, Bamako Rail Band or, most comprehensively and formally, Super Rail Band of the Buffet Hotel de la Gare, Bamako.

== Background ==
Rail Band's fame was built upon the mid-20th century craze for Latin — especially Cuban — jazz music which came out of Congo in the 1940s. The Rail Band was one of the first West African acts to combine this mature Afro-Latin sound with traditional instruments and styles. In their case, this was built upon the Mande Griot praise singer tradition, along with Bambara and other Malian and Guinean musical traditions. Their distinctive sound came from combining electric guitar and jazz horns with soaring Mandinka and Bamabara lyrical lines, African and western drums, and local instruments such as the kora and the balafon. At their height of fame in the 1970s, the Rail Band played to sold-out venues and even stadia across West Africa, and launched solo careers for many of its members, including Salif Keita.

== History ==
The first incarnation of the Rail Band was founded in 1970, sponsored by the Ministry of Information and the railway administration. The Malian government had, since the '60s, been sponsoring cultural events and groups to promote national traditions, the Rail Band was among those programs. The band performed as the house band at the Buffet Bar of the Station Hotel in Bamako, from which it takes its name. Beginning as a Latin Jazz band in the style of Congolese Soukous, it soon began integrating local Manding musical styles and traditions, with vocals in the Bambara language. From early on the band featured electric guitar, electric organ, saxophone, horns, and a western drum kit alongside Mande music using kora, balafon, ngoni, talking drums, Islamic-style, Mande hunter co-fraternity song, and griot praise-singing vocals.

== Members ==
The Rail Band's lead singer in the 1970s was Salif Keita, who left the band to join the rival Super Ambassadeurs, and then follow a successful solo career in 1982.

The group soon became a training ground for many of Mali's most popular performers, such as singer Mory Kanté and guitarist Kante Manfila. Guitarist Djelimady Tounkara has been a member of the band for most of its history. The band, changing personnel many times, continues to perform around the world.

In May 2020, Kanté died from chronic illness.

== Recognition ==
According to the Timbuktu Renaissance initiative, Super Biton is one of "two bands in particular [that] have left an indelible mark on the Malian musical landscape", the other being Rail Band, both "pioneers of the fusion of the traditional sounds and rhythms of Ségou and modern genres.

== Discography ==
Albums

- 1970 : Sunjata (Bärenreiter-Musicaphon)
- 1976 : Melodias "Rail Band" du Mali (Kouma)
- 1976 : Concert "Rail Band" du Mali (Kouma)
- 1977 : Orchestre du Buffet Hôtel de la Gare de Bamako (HNLX 5179)
- 1979 : Affair Social (Sacodis LS-25)
- 1985 : New Dimensions in Rail Culture (Globestyle)
- 1994 : Super Rail Band de Bamako/ Djougouya Magni (Indigo)
- 1996 : Mansa (Indigo)
- 2003 : Kongo Sigui (Indigo)

Contributing artist

- 1995 : The Rough Guide to West African Music (World Music Network)
- 2012 : The Rough Guide to Psychedelic Africa (World Music Network)
- Complete discography available at the Radio Africa web site

== See also ==
- Music of Mali
- Super Biton de Ségou
