= The Rough Guide to World Music =

Compilation album by Various artists
- Released: 25 October 1994
- Genre: World
- Length: 71:26
- Label: World Music Network

Full series chronology
The Rough Guide to World Music (1994)	The Rough Guide to West African Music (1995)

The Rough Guide to World Music is a world music compilation album originally released in the United Kingdom in 1994. The first of the World Music Network Rough Guides World Music series, it was co-released with an eponymous reference book. The album features artists hailing from Africa, the Americas, Asia, and Europe. Artwork was designed by Impetus, and the compilation was produced by Phil Stanton, co-founder of the World Music Network.

== Reception ==
Professional ratings
Review scores
Source	Rating
AllMusic	4.5/5 stars

Raymond McKinney of AllMusic called the album an "ideal way to taste-test the endless flavors the genre has to offer." Michaelangelo Matos, writing for the Chicago Reader, described the first two thirds as "pretty scintillating" but the last third as "folkloric" and "boring".

== Track listing ==
No.	Title	Artist (Country)	Length
1.	"Rebellion"	Joe Arroyo (Colombia)	6:09
2.	"Sama Rew"	Africando (United States) (Senegal)	4:17
3.	"Dugu Kamelenba"	Oumou Sangare (Mali)	5:08
4.	"Zaiko Wa Wa"	Zaiko Langa Langa (Zaire) (Democratic Republic of the Congo)	5:40
5.	"Diandioli"	Étoile de Dakar (Senegal)	4:52
6.	"Rwanamiza"	Cécile Kayirebwa (Rwanda)	5:02
7.	"Jono"	Tarika Sammy (Madagascar)	3:57
8.	"Tsaiky Mboly Hely"	Henry Kaiser & David Lindley with Roger Georges (United States) (Madagascar)	4:04
9.	"Henna"	Ali Hassan Kuban (Egypt)	3:55
10.	"Tanola Nomads"	Sainkho Namtchylak (Tuva) (Russia)	4:59
11.	"Goodbye Again"	Guo Yue & Joji Hirota (China) (Japan)	7:13
12.	"Khosid Wedding Dances"	Muzsikás (Hungary)	4:10
13.	"When I'm Up I Can't Get Down"	Oyster Band (England)	3:30
14.	"Hot Tamale Baby"	Buckwheat Zydeco (United States)	4:41
15.	"Theid Mi Dhach"	Talitha MacKenzie (United States)	3:01
