= Bassekou Kouyate =

Malian musician (born 1966)

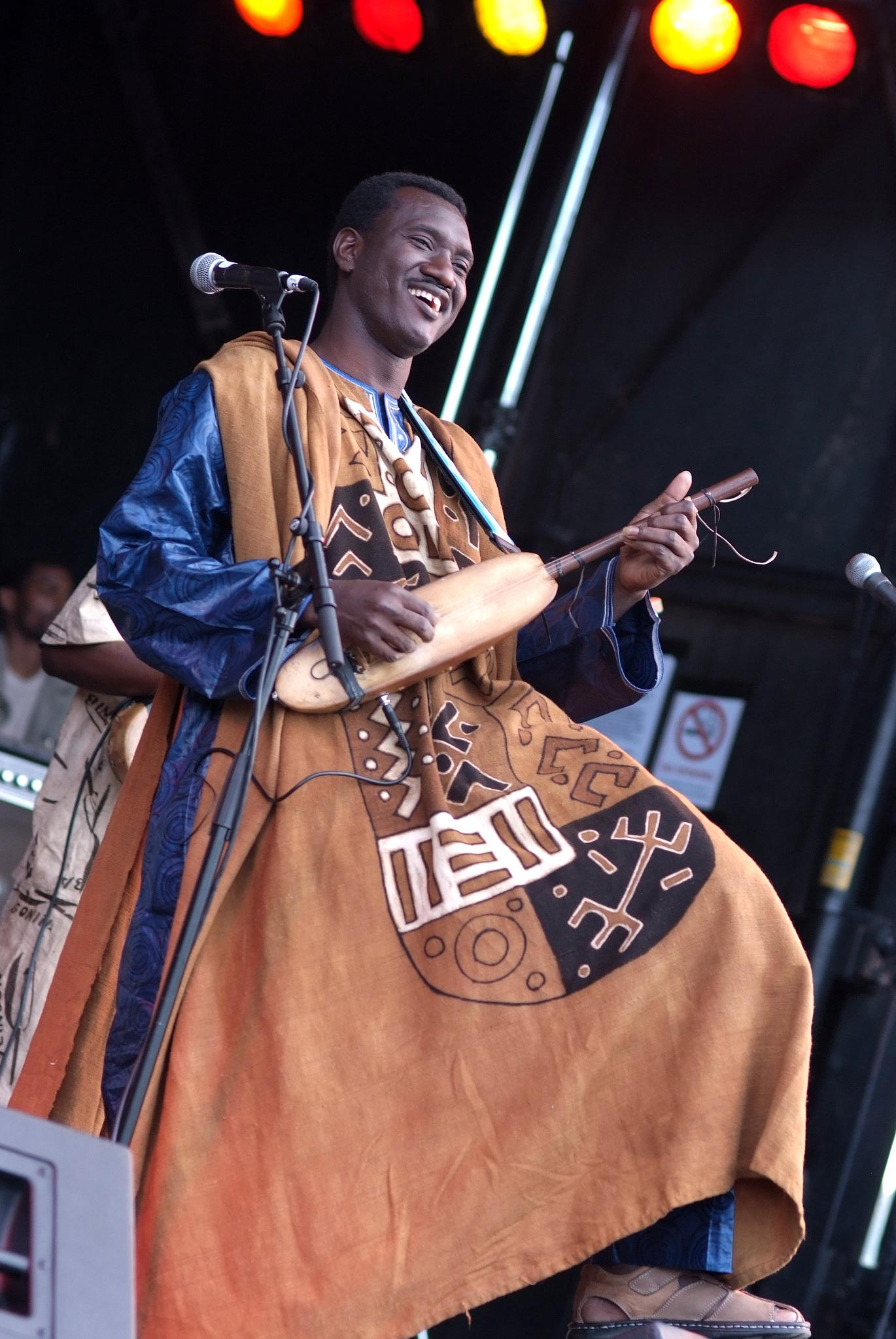
- Performing live in 2008

Background information
- Born: 1966 (age 59–60)
- Genres: Music of Mali; pop; world music
- Occupation: Musician
- Instrument: ngoni
- Years active: 1978–present
- Label: Outhere Records (Proper Music Distribution)

Bassekou Kouyate (born 1966) is a musician from Mali. His band is known as Ngoni ba.

== Life and career ==
He was born into the Kouyate family in Garana, Barouéli Cercle, 60 kilometres from Ségou, in 1966. At the age of 12, he started playing the ngoni. In the late 1980s he moved to the capital, Bamako.

Kouyate's debut album, Segu Blue, was released internationally in 2007 by Outhere Records and distributed in the U.K. by Proper Music Distribution. The album was produced by Lucy Durán. He has also appeared on a number of albums by Toumani Diabaté and has performed in several European countries. In 2010, Kouyaté toured with Béla Fleck.

Kouyate's wife, Amy Sacko, is also a successful solo artist and sings lead in his band. His father, Mustapha Kouyate, was a ngoni player and his mother Yagaré Damba was a praise singer. Kouyate, together with Amy Sacko and Ngoni ba, appeared at The 2013 Proms.

== Discography ==
=== Albums ===
- Bassekou Kouyate & Ngoni Ba: Segu Blue (Outhere Records, 2007)
- Bassekou Kouyate & Ngoni Ba: I Speak Fula (Outhere Records, 2009)
- Bassekou Kouyate & Ngoni Ba: Jama Ko (Outhere Records, 2013)
- Bassekou Kouyate & Ngoni Ba: Ba Power (Glitterbeat Records, 2015)
- Bassekou Kouyate & Ngoni Ba: Miri (Outhere Records, 2019)
- Bassekou Kouyate & Amy Sacko: Djudjon (One World Records, 2024)

=== Contributing artist ===
- The Rough Guide to Desert Blues (World Music Network, 2010)

== Filmography ==
- 2008: Throw Down Your Heart, by Sascha Paladino: Himself
- 2013: The Africa Express, by Renaud Barret and Florent de La Tullaye: Himself
- 2016: Easy Man, by Jasper Cremers and Dennis de Groot: Himself
- 2016: Mali Blues, by Lutz Gregor: Himself

== Awards ==
- 2008 – BBC Radio 3 Awards for World Music – Album of the Year & African Artist of the Year
