= Ramon Goose =

English Cuban-music guitarist

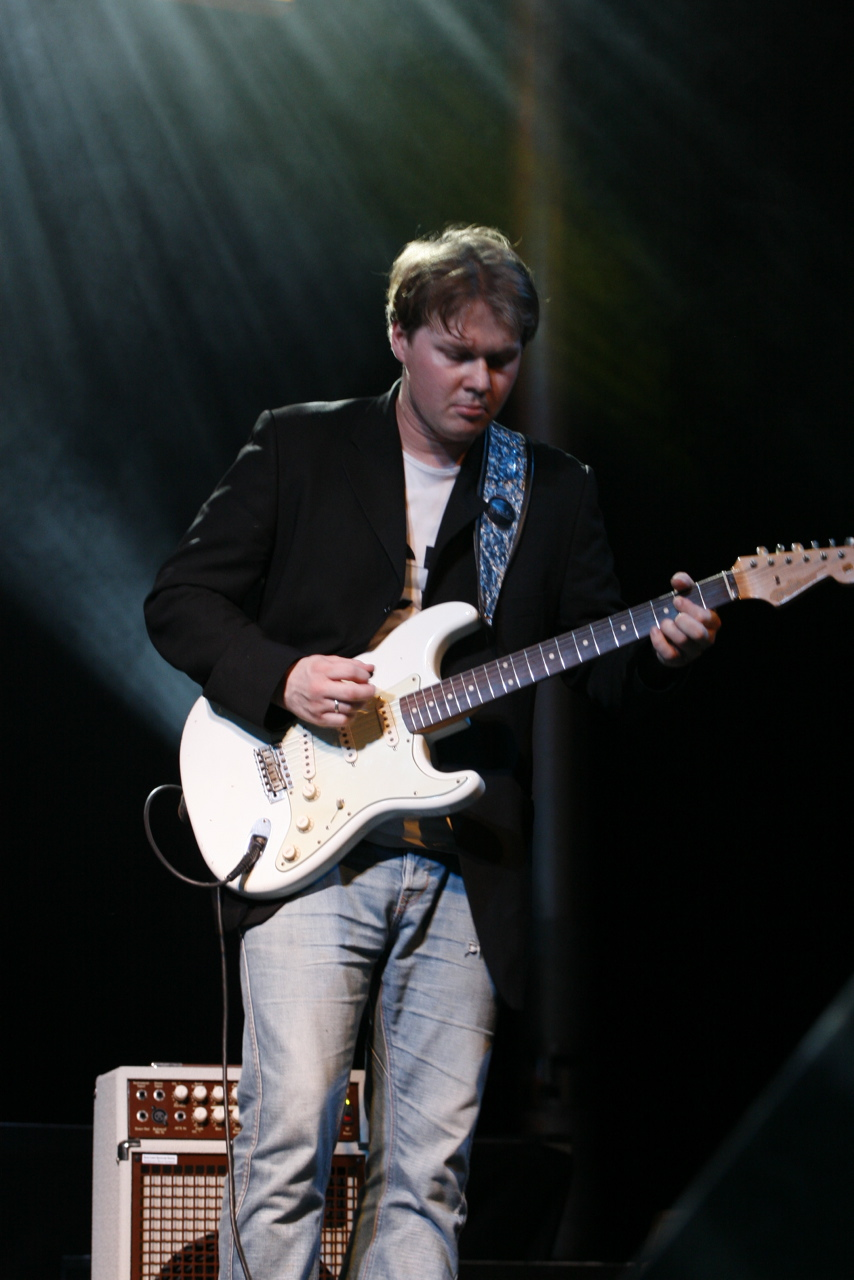
- Goose at the NuBlues Jazz Festival, Frankfurt, Germany, 28 October 2008

Background information
- Born: Colchester, Essex, England
- Genres: Cuban music, Son cubano, Blues, Latin rock
- Occupations: Musician, songwriter, record producer, music instructor
- Instruments: Vocals, guitar, n'goni
- Years active: 1990–present
- Labels: ARC Music, Metisse Music, Acoustic-Records, 21st Century Blues Records, Discovery Records, Dixiefrog Records, Black and Tan Records
- Website: ramongoose.co.uk

Ramon Goose (born 1975) is an English guitarist, singer and producer. Initially known for blues and for West African–blues fusion with the West African Blues Project and the hip hop blues band NuBlues, he has since 2023 worked chiefly in Cuban music, recording in Havana and Santiago de Cuba and forming the band The Compadres with Joaquín Solórzano, for twenty years a member of Compay Segundo's band. He is also known for his slide guitar playing, for producing albums for American blues artists, and for writing the first instructional book for the n'goni.

== Biography ==
Goose was born and raised in Colchester, Essex, England, born to an Argentine father and English mother. Goose was influenced by blues, tango, bolero, cumbia (having spent part of his childhood in Buenos Aires), jazz and West African music (citing artists such as Ry Cooder, Manuel Galban, Ali Farka Toure and Davey Graham as major influences to his style). He started out with British band NuBlues as guitarist, chief songwriter and producer. With NuBlues he made the album Dreams of a Blues Man (released on Dixiefrog Records in Europe, 21st Century Blues Records in the United States, and published by Metisse Music) and has toured all over Europe, with Eric Burdon, the Blind Boys of Alabama and others; performed with James Brown's bandleader Pee Wee Ellis; and worked with Chris Thomas King. After a short stint with American bluesman Eric Bibb, in 2006, Goose went on to produce, perform on and co-write critically acclaimed albums for other blues artists. His production for Mississippi blues artist Boo Boo Davis was voted Top Ten Blues Album in a MOJO magazine poll in 2006, and his production of Billy Jones (based in Arkansas) — both on Black and Tan Records — also received accolades from critics. Recent projects have included an album with Senegalese musician Diabel Cissokho, and production of the second NuBlues album, Snow on the Tracks. Goose ended 2009 with a tour with his own band, including four performances at maximum security prisons to test his new material, which he released on the album Uptown Blues in 2011. He has continued touring with his world music/blues band (including Cissokho) and performing with artists such as Daby Touré (from Mauritania), Noumoucounda Cissoko (from Senegal), Atongo Zimba (from Ghana) and the Algerian oud virtuoso Yazid Fentazi and English/Urdu singer Najma Akhtar.

In 2010, Goose formed a side project, the West African Blues Project, to further explore the link between blues and African music — a track of this project is featured on Rough Guide to African blues (World Music Network). In mid 2011, Goose met musician Jim Palmer backstage at WOMAD festival. where Palmer was performing with Baaba Maal. Joining with Modou Toure, (singer for Touré Kunda) Goose and Palmer formed the band Coconut Revolution; an album is expected in early 2013 from Coconut Revolution. In 2012, Goose started working on the Desert Rock, a unique musical project which evolved after he travelled to the Sahara and Dakar, combining his love of Berber and Mandinka rhythms and melodies with blues rock. In the summer of 2014 Goose showcased his new band, World Scatterings, which consists of a cast of musicians from around the world, drawing on elements of blues, folk and African music rhythms. In 2014, Goose released the album, Blues & Spirituals, on Acoustic Music Records. In 2016, Goose accepted the opportunity to perform at Buckingham Palace. The same year, he toured with The West African Blues Project across UK and Europe. Goose released, Long Road To Tiznit, which was recorded in Marrakesh and London, on 25 August 2017. After performing and recording 3 albums in Havana and Santiago de Cuba in 2023 Ramon formed his new Latin/Cuban/Rock influenced band The Compadres. In April 2025 Ramon released the single 'Porque' with the late Cuban bolero singer Nancy Maura. In Summer 2025 Ramon recorded an album with the 89 year old Cuban legend Alejandro Almenares, the last remaining original troubadour of Cuba's Trova style recording at EGREM studios in Santiago de Cuba.

== Band lineup ==
Ramon Goose & The Compadres	Ramon Goose, lead guitar, vocals; Kieffer Santander, percussion, drums; Joe Goose, bass guitar

== Discography ==
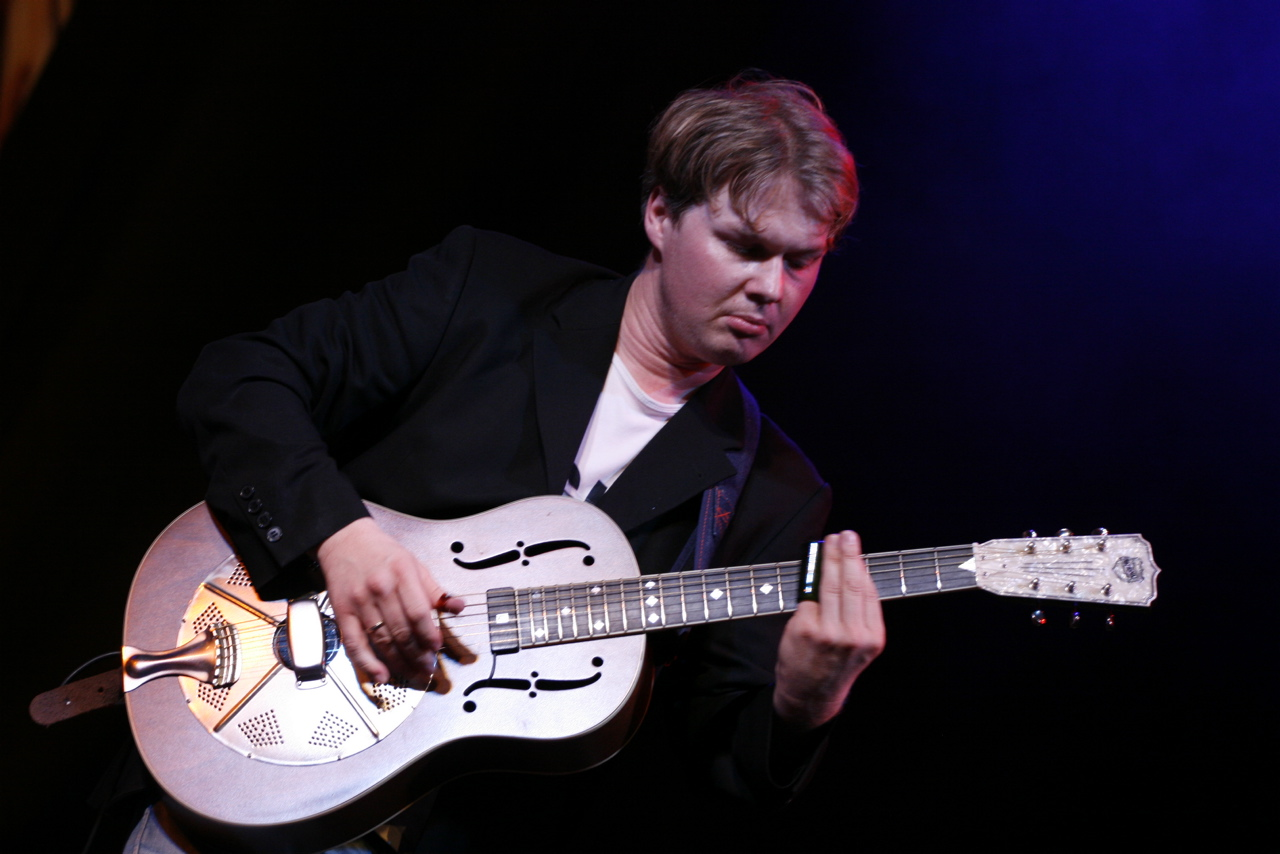
Goose playing slide guitar on a resonator guitar, 2006, Germany. Courtesy: Christian Sahm

=== Solo ===
- Mansana Blues, with Diabel Cissokho (2010), Dixiefrog Records
- Uptown Blues (2011), Music Avenue Records
- Blues and Spirituals (2014), Acoustic Music Records
- The West African Blues Project, with Modou Toure (2015), ARC Music
- Long Road to Tiznit (2017), World Music Network/ Riverboat Records
- Melencolia II E.P. (2021), Tekni Records
- Porque, with Nancy Maura (2025), Tekni Records

=== With The Compadres ===
- Ahora En Pekin, (2025), Tekni Records

=== With NuBlues ===
- Dreams of a Blues Man (2004), Dixiefrog/21st Century Records
- Snow on the Tracks (2008), Dixiefrog Records

=== Albums produced by Ramon Goose ===
- Boo Boo Davis, Drew, Mississippi (2005), Black and Tan Records
- Billy Jones, My Hometown (2006), Black and Tan Records

=== Select special appearances and compilations ===
- Putumayo Presents African Blues, various artists (Putumayo, 2012)
- Rough Guide to African Blues, various artists, (World Music Network, 2014)
- Rethink, Billy Hill and Ramon Goose (Rough Trade, 2015)
- Coffret FIP Vol.1, various artists (FIP, 2015)
- An African Journey - Music from Cairo to Cape Town, various artists (ARC, 2018)
- The Rough Guide To A World Of Guitar, various artists (World Music Network, 2019)
- Pure Africa, various artists (ARC, 2020)

=== Books authored by Goose ===
- Learn The Ngoni, A Beginners Guide to Learning the N'goni, Desert Road (2018)

== Guitars and amplifiers ==
- Ramon uses ESP Navigator Series Guitars. Chapter Guitars (based in London) built him the a Cuban style electric tres guitar, Coodercasters, Fender D'aquisto and a Seiwa Powersonic guitar.
- Ramon uses Custom by Cougar Mystic Blues amplifiers and Bill Krinard Filmosound Projector Amplifiers & also Marshall amps.
