= Doc Terry =

- Born: Terry Adail; December 14, 1921; Sunflower, Mississippi, U.S.
- Died: August 23, 2001 (aged 79) East St. Louis, Illinois, U.S.
- Genre: Electric blues
- Occupations: Musician, songwriter
- Instruments: Vocals, harmonica
- Years active: 1940s–1990s

Terry Adail (December 14, 1921 – August 23, 2001), known professionally as Doc Terry, was an American blues musician who started playing the harmonica at the age of 12, influenced by Sonny Boy Williamson I whom he would hear play at country picnics in Greenville, Mississippi. During his career, Terry played with blues musicians such as Muddy Waters, Howlin' Wolf, Yank Rachell and Henry Townsend.

== Biography ==
After serving in the United States Army during World War II in the Pacific theater, Terry returned to the U.S. and became active in the St. Louis blues scene in the late 1940s. During the 1950s he played in juke joints all around the St. Louis area. When Boo Boo Davis moved to St. Louis in the 1960s, he joined Terry's band for a time. In the 1970s, Terry formed his own record label called D.T.P. Records, named after his band, Doc Terry and the Pirates. Terry led the Pirates with vocals and harmonica playing, and was joined by Thomas Johnson on guitar, Nathaniel Thomas on drums, Peter Smorodin on bass, with Patti Thomas providing additional vocals. The Pirates performed mainly around the St. Louis area at venues that included: the USS President, Union Station Biergarten, Broadway Oyster Bar, Webster Grill and Blueberry Hill. In 1988, they were featured on a PBS television documentary about the St. Louis blues scene, which also included blues artists James Crutchfield, James DeShay and George McCoy.

== Discography ==
=== Singles ===
- "Rock With Doc" / "Who Do Blues"; D.T.P. Records TS71-74 / TS71-75
- "Things Can't Stay The Same" / "Dr. Boogie"; D.T.P. Records TS74-588 / TS-74-589
- "Running Blues" / "Down The Road I Go"; D.T.P. Records DTP-1421 (1971)

=== Compilation album tracks ===
- Chicago Blues; Various Artists; JSP CD 401 (1997)

"Dr. Boogie" / "Things Can't Stay The Same"

- Chicago Blues 2; Various Artists; JSP CD 405 (1998)

"Who Do Blues"

- The Best of Harmonica Blues; Various Artists; Wolf 120105 (2001)

"Born In The Delta"

- St. Louis Blues Today; Various Artists; Wolf 120941 (2015)

"Born In The Delta" / "A.C.D. Blues"

- Harpin' On It - A Blues Harmonica Anthology; Various Artists; JSP CD 811 (2017)

"Dr. Boogie" / "Things Can't Stay The Same"
