= Boo Boo Davis =

American electric blues musician

- Born: James Davis; November 4, 1943 (age 82); Drew, Mississippi, United States
- Genre: Electric blues
- Occupations: Musician, songwriter
- Instruments: Vocals, harmonica, guitar, drums
- Years active: 1950s–present
- Labels: Black & Tan Records
- Website: booboodavis.com

James "Boo Boo" Davis (born November 4, 1943) is an American electric blues musician. Davis is one of the few remaining blues musicians who gained experience singing the blues in the Mississippi Delta, having sung to help pass the time while picking the cotton fields.

== Biography ==
=== Early life ===
Davis was born in Drew, Mississippi, where he was raised in the heart of Mississippi Delta. Davis got the nickname Boo Boo from his father as a child; the name derives from his three uncles James, Boo-Jack and Davis. Davis's passion for music started at age five when his mother took him to church and he played the harmonica and sang. Blues musicians such as John Lee Hooker, Elmore James, Robert Pete Williams and Robert Petway visited the family home to rehearse blues songs with Davis' father, Sylvester Davis. When he was eighteen years old he began playing drums for the family band, Lard Can Band, because Davis did not possess a drum kit and was forced to play on a lard can. The band featured his multi-instrumental father, Sylvester Sr., his younger brother Sylvester Jr. on the guitar, and his sister Clara on vocals. The band played throughout the state of Mississippi, including a stint as the back up for B. B. King, who was unknown at the time.

=== Career ===
Davis moved north in the early 1960s and played all around the Illinois area until his older brother brought him to St. Louis where he sang and played drums with Doc Terry. After leaving Doc Terry's band, Davis started a band with Little Aaron who wrote the song, "East St. Louis", which later featured on Davis's album of the same name. Davis and Aaron backed up several blues legends such as Little Walter, Sonny Boy Williamson, Little Milton and Elmore James.

In 1972, Davis formed another family band called the Davis Brothers Band which played twice a week at a club in East St. Louis, Tabby's Red Room, for 18 years.

In 1999, Davis appeared on Arthur Williams' album Harpin' On It. In September of the same year he made his solo recording debut with Netherlands-based label Black and Tan Records. He made his first tour of Europe in 2000, performing in the Netherlands, Belgium, Switzerland, Germany, Austria, France and the UK. While in the UK, he recorded music for a BBC radio show hosted by The Blues Band's Paul Jones.

Davis's fourth album Drew, Mississippi (produced and co-written by British guitarist Ramon Goose) featured in the top 10 blues albums of 2006 according to Mojo. In 2007, Davis performed live on Canadian national radio station CBC Radio One.

Davis's song "I'm So Tired", was used in a television commercial for 5-Hour Energy and an episode of Sons of Anarchy.

== Discography ==
=== Albums ===
- East St. Louis (1999)
- Can Man (2002)
- The Snake (2004)
- Drew, Mississippi (2006)
- Name of the Game (2008)
- Ain't Gotta Dime (2009)
- Undercover Blues (2011)
- What Kind of Shit Is This? (2014)
- Oldskool (2015)
- One Chord Blues (2016)
- Tree Man (2019)
- Boo Boo Boogaloo (2023)

=== Compilation albums ===
- Keeping Music Alive (2005)
- Black & Tan Sampler, Vol. 2 (2007)
