= Fanta Sacko =

Malian musician

- Origin: Mali
- Genres: Bajourou
- Occupation: Singer

Fanta Sacko is a Malian musician, whose debut, self-titled LP launched the bajourou music genre. She has helped establish a female singing tradition in Mali, which makes that country unique in West Africa, where female popular musicians are not generally approved of.
