= Kotéba National du Mali =

Malian theatre company

Since its formation in 1969, the drama troupe Kotéba National du Mali has performed classic pieces of by Malian, African, and even European authors.

In 1979, in search of a form of theatrical expression true to its traditional Bambaran heritage, the group took the form of the koteba consisting of chants, dance, burlesque comedy and comic satires.

The group's mission is to promote theatre in general and that of Mali in particular by giving value to traditional forms of popular national theater.

Today, the Kotéba National is engaged in the adaptation of modern techniques and methods to preserve and reemphasize the dramatic expression of the Malian people.

== Repertoire ==
- 1969 : La Mort de Chaka (Seydou Badjan Kouyaté)
- 1970 : Une si belle leçon de patience (Mansa M. Diabaté)
- 1972 : La Grande Prédiction
- 1972 : La Diaspora noire
- 1972 : Nègres, qu’avez-vous fait ? (Alkaly Kaba)
- 1972 : Les Hommes de Backchich
- 1976 : Les Gens des Marais (Wolé Soyinka)
- 1979 : Au mystérieux pays de Kaïdara (Amadou Hampaté Ba)
- 1979 : Kotè Tulon I « Cè tè malo »
- 1979 : On joue la comédie (Senouvo Agbota Zinsou) Togo
- 1980 : Kotè tlon II « Angoisses paysannes »
- 1983 : Kotè tlon III « Fugula nafama et Bura Musa Jugu »
- 1986 : Bougounieri
- 1988 : Wari (Ousmane Sow)
- 1989 : Féréké nyamibugu
- 1991 : Ansigué (Abdoulaye Diawara)
- 1996 : La Prise de Sikasso (Dr Abdoulaye Diallo)
- 1998 : I Kofle (création collective)
- 1998 : De l’Éden au Mandé (Massa Makan Diabaté)
- 1998 : Samanyana Basi (super production)
- 1999 : Kun cèma turuni (création collective)
- 2000 : La Valeur d’un serment (Younouss Touré)
- 2000 : Mali Sadio (Fily Dabo Sissoko)
- 2001 : Kaïdara (Ousmane Sow et Gabriel Magma Konaté)
- 2002 : Politiki kèlè (Gabriel Magma Konaté)
- 2003 : Bakari jan et Bilisi (adaptation de Gabriel Magma Konaté)
- 2006 : Les Fous démocrates
- 2008 : Dugubakonoko

== Tours ==
At the national level

Numerous tours covering nearly all of Mali. Usually around ten showings monthly.

At the international level

- Participation at the festival de la jeunesse francophone 1974
- Participation at the festival Mondial du théâtre amateur (Monaco) 1981
- Tour of cultural exchange in Côte d'Ivoire 1981
- Participation at the festival international de théâtre pour le développement FITD, 3rd Edition (Ansigué).
- Participation at the festival international du théâtre pour le développement (La Prise de Sikasso et Les Aveugles voleurs)

== Awards ==
- Laureat of the 12th concourse of inter-African theater (living theater) 1982
