= Fanta Damba =

- Born: 1938 (age 87–88); Ségou, Mali
- Occupations: Singer, griot
- Years active: 1950s-1985

Mali flag

Fanta Damba (born 1938 in Ségou) is a Malian djelimuso (Bambara female Griot-singer) known to her fans as La Grande Vedette Malienne. Damba was a successful Mali musician born into the Jeli family, who are often called Griots. She began singing as a child while being surrounded by a family full of musicians. Damba began recording in her early twenties with Radio Mali. Fanta was one of Mali's most famous women from 1960 to 1970. In 1975, she became the first djelimuso to tour Europe solo and was also known for performing at the Mali national ensemble performance of the African Festival of Arts and Culture held in Lagos in 1977. She was rewarded for her talent by being named as a Ngara, which usually recognizes one as being a master musician. Many musicians aspire to be a Ngara, but very few held the title. In order for a Griot to be recognized as a Ngara, one must be considered to possess great courage, are skilled, experienced, disciplined and are a successful musician usually over the age of forty. It is considered a gift that most musicians are recognized as having at an early age. A Ngara also usually has a strong middle tone voice that can control the crowd with emotions. Mali women such as Fanta were known for their praise singing and did not play a variety of instruments unlike the men. She inspired other famous Mali musicians such as Yousou NDour, who went to visit Fanta and was so taken away by her music that he was inspired to write the song Wareff in relevance to Fanta's song Djadjiri. Female Mali musicians typically received more attention and gifts such as cars, houses, jewelry, and gold than male Mali musicians. They were represented through the media, concerts, markets, and were perceived as the stars. Fanta retired as a performer in 1985.

== Discography ==
- Première anthologie de la Musique malienne, volume 6. La tradition épique (1971), Bärenreiter-Musicaphon – LP
- La grande vedette malienne (1975), Songhoï Records – LP avec Batourou Sekou Kouyaté
- Hamet (1975), Songhoï Records – LP avec Batourou Sekou Kouyaté
- Ousmane Camara (1975), Songhoï Records – LP avec Batourou Sekou Kouyaté
- Sékou Semega (1977), Songhoï Records – LP avec Batourou Sekou Kouyaté
- Bahamadou Simogo (1980), Celluloid – LP
- Fanta Damba (1981), Sonodisc – LP
- Fanta Damba (1982), Sako Production – LP
- Fanta Damba (1983), Sako Production – LP
- Fanta Damba (1985), Disques Esperance – LP
- Fanta Damba du Mali Vol. 1 (2002), Bolibana – CD
- Fanta Damba du Mali Vol. 2 (2002), Bolibana – CD
- Fanta Damba du Mali Vol. 3 (2002), Bolibana – CD
