= L'Ensemble Instrumental National =

Malian orchestra

National Instrumental Ensemble of Mali Ensemble Instrumental National du Mali
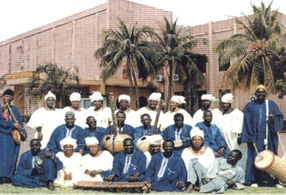

Background information
- Origin: Mali
- Genres: Traditional music, world music
- Years active: 1961-present
- Labels: Sono Africa, Mali Kunkan

l'Ensemble Instrumental National du Mali (English: National Instrumental Ensemble of Mali) is an orchestra of traditional Malian music and song.

It was established the day after the Independence of Mali in 1961. Its mission is to maintain and give value to the heritage of Malian forms of music and song.

== Repertoire ==
- Duga: (Hymn of bravery)
- Maliba: (Glory to Mali)
- Mamaya
- Soweto (a memory of Soweto)
- Sogo: (hymn for the hunters, symbols of honesty and bravery)
- Soundiata: (Mandingue Epic)
- Dâ Monzon: (Bambaran Epic)
- Sosso: (to encourage joy, happiness, and love)
- Taara: (homage to bravery)
- Sécurité: (homage to the army)
- Janjo: (homage to bravery)
- Musolu: (homage to women)
- Cedo: (homage to bravery)
- Bamba Niaré: Jatigiya (Hospitality)

== Tours ==
- 1961: Artistic tour in USSR
- 1964: Animation Salon International de POCORA/Pris (France)
- 1966: First World Festival of Negro Arts in Dakar (Senegal, FESMAN)
- 1969: Pan-African Arts Festival in Algiers (Algeria, PANAF)
- 1977: Second World Black and African Festival of Arts and Culture (FESTAC 77)
- 1978: Algeria
- 1979: Festival in Guinea (Conakry)
- 1979: France, Germany, Switzerland, and the Netherlands
- 1980: Niger
- 1983: China, Korea, and USSR
- 1986: Korea
- 1987: Festival in Libya
- 1996: Festival Republic of Congo (Brazzaville, FESPAM)
- 1997: New Orleans Jazz Festival (USA) and performance in New York
- 1999: 4th Annual Roots Festival à Banjul (Gambia)
- 2000: Malian Fair in Paris
- 2000: CAN at Accra (Ghana)
- 2001: Faire at the Gallery Fayette (Paris)
- 2002: Dakar (Senegal)
- 2003: Night of solidarity and integration (Ouagadougou)
- 2003: Smithsonian Folklife Festival in Washington, D.C.

== Prizes ==
- 1963: Medal for the Folklore at the Théâtre des Nations in Paris
- 1966: Gold medal (first prize) at the World Festival of Black Arts in Dakar
- 1969: Gold medal (first prize) at the Pan-African Arts Festival in Algiers (Algeria)
- 1995: Gold medal of Melody in Johannesburg (Johannesburg Biennale)

== Instruments ==
- Kora
- Balafon
- Flute
- N’Goni
- N’Polon
- Kamalen N’Goni
- Dundun
- Soku
- Djembé

== Discography ==
- One Album, 33 Days
- Epopée Mandingue
- Epopée Bambara
- Musolu
