= Les Balayeurs du désert =

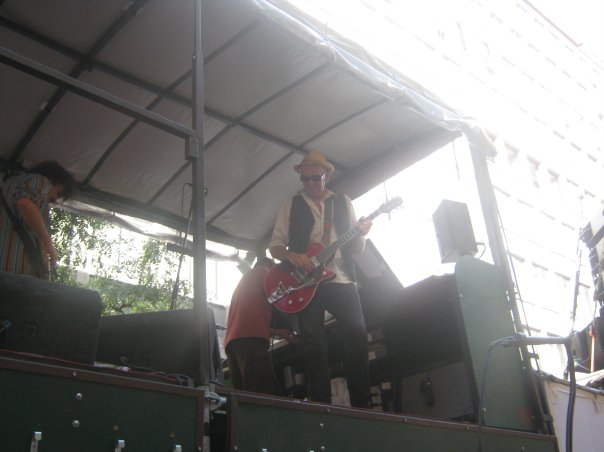
- Les Balayeurs du désert @ Santiago streets

Background information
- Origin: Nantes, France
- Genres: Ambient
- Years active: 1997 – present
- Label: Believe
- Members: Michel Augier; Fatoumata Diawara; Fred Tanari; Jean Michel Bourroux; Bruno Lerouzic; Gram Maby; Camilla Sagues; Marcela Paz
- Past members: Fred Simbolotti

Les Balayeurs du désert are a French ambient post-rock band. The group is composed of Michel Augier (composition, vocals, guitar), Fatoumata Diawara (vocals), Fred Tanari (keyboards, bass, vocals), Jean Michel Bourroux (drums), Bruno Lerouzic (pipes), Gram Maby (bass), Camilla Sagues (chorus) and Marcela Paz (chorus).

Les Balayeurs du désert have released three albums, and have also accompanied the Royal de Luxe theatre company providing music for several productions.

== Discography ==
- Chasseurs de girafes (2000)
- Jules Verne Impact (2005)
- Bazar musical interplanetaire (2009)
- La Pequeña (2011)
- Live à Guadalajara (2011)
