= Super Biton de Ségou =

Malian musical group

Super Biton de Ségou, Super Biton for short and also known as the Orchestre Régional de Segou and Super Biton National de Ségou, are an African jazz musical group. They were especially popular and influential in the 1970s, when they became the national orchestra of Mali, and in the first half of the 1980s. They formed in Ségou, Mali, in the 1960s, had up to 19 members at one point, but dwindled after 1986 after band leader Amadou Bâ left. After a hiatus, they re-formed with four new members and guitarist Mama Sissoko as band leader in 2001, and started playing the closing set at the Festival sur le Niger in Ségou each year.

== Background and style ==
Super Biton de Ségou was founded in the 1960s in Ségou. They are Mali's oldest dance band, and one of the oldest African orchestras.

Named after the leader of the Bamana kingdom, Bitòn Coulibaly, their music is based in the style of the Bambara people ("bambara jazz", incorporating a lot of brass instruments), but also touched by Fulani, Mandingo, and Somono cultures. It is heavily influenced by Cuban music, including the use of congas and bongo drums, and combines traditional and contemporary elements.

== History ==
Super Biton was created in the mid-1960s, with the members coming from several regional orchestras. They became known to the general public in Mali during the Youth Weeks ("Semaines de la Jeunesse"), where they won several prizes between 1964 and 1968. They broke into the scene in 1970, when they made a transition to incorporate more traditional elements – incorporating the "driving dance rhythms" of Bambara style – along with horns and guitars. The first Biennale culturelle, established by president Moussa Traoré in 1970, brought them national recognition. Other bands, such as Super Djata, followed their lead stylistically.

Original members included vocalists Mamadou Doumbia ("Percé"), Toussaint Siané, Papa Gaoussou Diarra ("Papus"), Aboubacar Kissa ("Cubain"); and horn player and band leader Amadou Bâ. Mama Sissoko, guitarist, joined in 1972 from the Kayes orchestra. They recorded several albums.

By the mid-1970s, Super Biton were hailed as Mali's first "national orchestra", and at one point had 19 musicians and a repertoire of over 200 songs. By 1977, they had released two albums under the name Super Biton National de Ségou. Owing to the cultural policy of the 1970s, they had a mandate to showcase the cultural heritage of the region. They were to represent not only the Bambara, but the Bobo people, and especially the hunters (known as Dozo). The songs had to be educational, and to encourage Malian young people to work and show bravery. Percé Doumbia, Toussaint Siané, and Abou Kissa went into the bush and recorded the voices of old women sing the ceremonial songs of marriage and female circumcision.

In 1976, being named "national orchestra" made them civil servants of the Malian state, and therefore residents for life. Subsequently, some of the original band members died, and some became disillusioned.

They played at the Angoulême Festival for several years. In 1986, the festival director organised a tour for the band, which included the jazz festival in Nancy, France as well as performances in West Germany and East Germany. After this, Amadou Bâ left the band, and some members left to pursue solo careers; Mamadou Percé Doumbia went to France.

In 2001, the Festival sur le Niger (Sur le Fleuve festival) instigated the recruitment of four new young musicians for Super Biton, and the group re-formed. Super Biton started playing as the closing act at the annual festival. The reformed line-up included original members Mama Sissoko (who took over from Bâ as band leader), Toussaint, Papus, Cubain, and the oldest surviving member of the group Mamadou Coulibaly ("Coulou"), along with new recruits.

== Recognition ==
The group is widely acclaimed and regarded as a major influence on subsequent musicians in Mali. Rough Guides' 1999 reference work, World Music, describes the band as "a pioneering 1980s roots band in the rocking Bamana tradition of Ségou".

It won the National Biennial competition in Mali in 1970, 1972, 1974, and 1976, before being put out of competition and being named national orchestra.

According to the Timbuktu Renaissance initiative, Super Biton is one of "two bands in particular [that] have left an indelible mark on the Malian musical landscape", the other being Rail Band, both "pioneers of the fusion of the traditional sounds and rhythms of Ségou and modern genres.

== Members ==
Mama Sissoko, who joined in 1972 from the Kayes orchestra, took over from Amadou Bâ as band leader when they re-formed in 2001.

The line-up has included:

- Amadou Bâ – trumpet, band leader (left 1987)
- Mamadou Doumbia – ("Percé") lead vocals
- Mama Sissoko – guitar (band leader in the 2000s)
- Papa Gaoussou Diarra ("Papus") – lead vocals (died 25 January 2015)
- Abou Touré – alto sax
- Toussaint Siané – lead vocals
- Aboubacar Kissa ("Cubain") (12 April 1952 – 12 April 2021) – lead vocal
- Mamadou Coulibaly ("Coulou") – lead vocals
- Mamadou 'Blick' Diarra ("Blick") – saxophone
- Dramane Diarra – bass
- Modibo Diarra ("Bebel") – keyboards
- Zoumana Diarra – guitarist, composer and instrument maker (possibly not long)
