= Bouba Sacko =

Bouba Sacko was a Malian contemporary guitarist.

== Biography ==
When Sacko started playing guitar in the 1960s, the concept of "artist guitarist" barely existed. Only griot artists must sing, dance or play guitariste in Mali. He wasn't a griot, but he changed this rule. He was one of the first nobles to play guitar. The famed praise musicians of West Africa's Mande people mostly worked with the Kora (21-string harp), Ngoni (spike lute) and wooden-slatted Balafon. Bouba's father, Ibrahim Sacko, was the director of the state-sponsored Instrumental Ensemble of Mali, so the traditional repertoire and lore of Mande griot heritage surrounded him from the start. Either way, Sacko stuck with the guitar, developing a powerful capacity to evoke traditional instruments using his axe. He died on December 26, 2011.
