= Soku =

Musical instrument from West Africa

Soku player for L’Ensemble Instrumental National in Bamako, Mali

A soku (Bambara: ߛߏ߬ߞߎ) is a traditional West African instrument used in a type of music called Wassoulou which originated in the Wasulu region of southwest Mali. It is a traditional fiddle, sometimes replaced by modernized versions of the instrument. Known as the n'diaraka or njarka in Songhai, and goje in Hausa, it is composed of a single string that usually wails the feminine vocal melody.
