= National Badema =

Malian orchestra

The National Badema is a Malian orchestra, formed in 1976 by former members of "les Maravillas du Mali”.

From the savanna in the south to the desert of the north, the Badema National's repertoire spans the diversity of Malian music. The orchestra's purpose is the revitalization of Malian musical heritage by the training, the supervision, and the production of albums for needy, up-and-coming musicians.

== Tours ==
- Foire Internationale of Dakar, Senegal
- Festival Panafricain de la Jeunesse of Tripoli, Libya
- Artistic Tour in Côte d'Ivoire
- 10th Festival of Guinea Conakry

== Instruments ==
The Badema employs traditional Malian instruments within the modern context. Even though its base lies with traditional rock instruments such as keyboards, guitars, and drums, the following instruments are employed by the Badema:

- balafon
- djembé
- Kamalen N’Goni
- soku (one-stringed violin)
- Tamani (talking drum)

== Discography ==
- National Badema du Mali 2004 OCLC 84649494
- Original Kasse Mady 1999 Sono CDS 7071 CD reissue
- Nama 1983 Syllart 38767-1 LP, initially released on Mali Kunkan / Ivoire Polydisc IP 8300 OCLC 634909465
- Tira Makan 1977 on Mali Kunkan (ref.KO 77.07.07) OCLC 658829068
