= Wassoulou music =

West African music genre

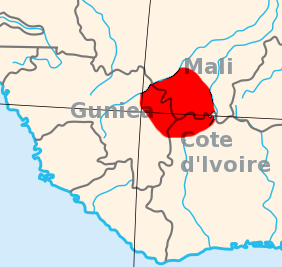
The Wassoulou region of West Africa

Wassoulou (Bambara: Wasolo) is a genre of West African popular music named for the Wassoulou cultural area.

Wassoulou music is performed mostly by women. Some recurring themes in the lyrics are childbearing, fertility, and polygamy. Instrumentation includes soku (a traditional fiddle sometimes replaced with modern imported instruments), djembe drum, kamalen n'goni (a six-stringed harp), karinyan (metal tube percussion) and bolon (a four-stringed harp). The vocals are often passionate and emphatic, and delivered in a call-and-response pattern.

Prominent Wassoulou artists include Nahawa Doumbia, Oumou Sangaré, Fatoumata Diawara, Coumba Sidibe, Dienaba Diakite, Kagbe Sidibe, Sali Sidibe, and Jah Youssouf.
