= Oumou Sangaré =

Malian singer (born 1968)

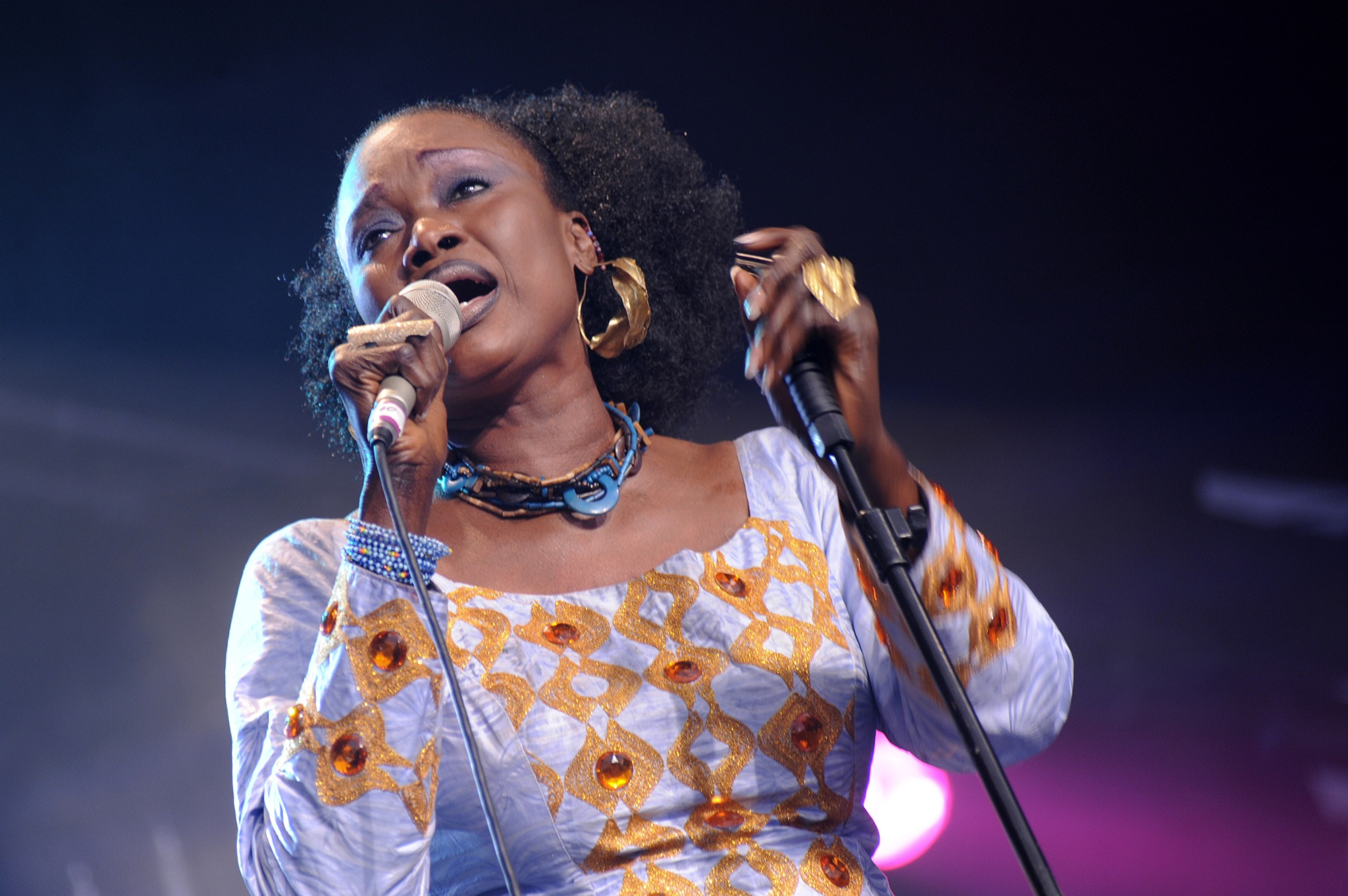
- Sangaré performing at the Cambridge Folk Festival in 2009

Background information
- Born: 25 February 1968 (age 58)
- Origin: Bamako, Mali
- Genres: Wassoulou
- Occupation: Singer
- Label: World Circuit
- Website: oumousangareofficial.com

Oumou Sangaré (Fula: umu sangare; born 25 February 1968) is a Malian Wassoulou singer of Fulani descent. She is often referred to as "The Songbird of Wassoulou". Wassoulou is a historical region south of the Niger River, where the music descends from age-old traditional song, often accompanied by a calabash.

== Early life ==
Sangaré was born in 1968 to singer Aminata Diakité and Sidiki Sangaré, both of whom originated from the Wassoulou region of Mali. In 1970, her father took a second wife and moved to Abidjan, Ivory Coast, leaving Sangaré, her mother and her siblings behind in Bamako, the Malian capital. Sangaré began singing in the streets to help her mother, leaving school at an early age to do so. Her career began in 1973 when at the age of five she won an inter-kindergarten singing competition in Bamako and performed before an audience of several thousands at the Omnisport stadium. At the age of 16, she went on tour with the percussion group Djoliba, touring in France, Germany, the Netherlands, the Caribbean, and elsewhere. Inspired by her reception on tour, Sangaré returned to Bamako and established her own musical group.

== Career ==
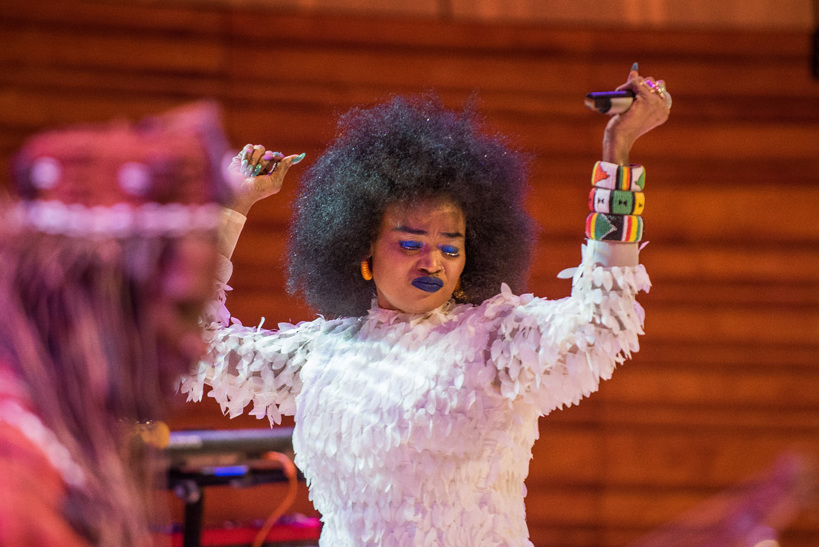
At WOMEX, 2017

Sangaré recorded her first album, Moussoulou ("Women"), for Malian producer Abdoulaye Samassa (Samassa Records), with Amadou Ba Guindo, a renowned maestro of Malian music. The album was very successful in Africa, with more than 200,000 copies sold.

With the help of Ali Farka Touré, Sangaré signed with the English label World Circuit. They re-released the album Moussoulou. At the age of 21, she was already a star.

Oumou Sangaré is considered an ambassador of Wassoulou; her music has been inspired by the music and traditional dances of the region. She writes and composes her songs, which often include social criticism, especially concerning women's low status in society.

Since 1990, she has performed at some of the most important venues in the world, including the Melbourne Opera, Roskilde Festival, Gnaoua World Music Festival, WOMAD, Oslo World Music Festival, and the Opéra de la Monnaie.

Many of Sangaré's songs concern love and marriage, especially freedom of choice in marriage. Her 1989 album Moussoulou was an unprecedented West African hit. In 1995, she toured with Baaba Maal, Femi Kuti, and Boukman Eksperyans. Other albums include Ko Sira (1993), Worotan (1996), and a 2-CD compilation Oumou (2004), all released on World Circuit Records. Sangaré supports the cause of women throughout the world. She was named an ambassador of the FAO in 2003 and won the UNESCO Prize in 2001 and was made a Commander of the Order of Arts and Letters of France in 1998.

Sangaré is featured prominently in Throw Down Your Heart, a 2008 documentary about world-renowned American banjo player Béla Fleck, and his exploration of the relatively unknown relationship between his instrument and the musical traditions in Africa.

Sangaré contributed vocals to "Imagine" for the 2010 Herbie Hancock album The Imagine Project, which also featured Seal, P!nk, India.Arie, Jeff Beck, Konono Nº1 and others.

In 2022, she was cast in her first acting role, playing the title character's grandmother in Maïmouna Doucouré's film Hawa.

== Personal life, politics and business ==
Sangaré is an advocate for women's rights, opposing child marriage and polygamy.

Sangaré is also involved in the world of business, including hotels, agriculture, and automobiles. She has launched a car, the "Oum Sang", manufactured by a Chinese firm and marketed in conjunction with her own company Gonow Oum Sang. She is the owner of the 30-room Hotel Wassoulou in Mali's capital, Bamako, a haven for musicians and her own regular performing space. "I helped build the hotel myself. I did it to show women that you can make your life better by working. And many more are working these days, forming co-operatives to make soap or clothes."

Sangaré has also been a goodwill ambassador for the United Nations Food and Agriculture Organization, but says she does not want to be a politician: "While you're an artist, you're free to say what you think; when you're a politician, you follow instructions from higher up."

She is a half-sister of Polish-born actor Omar Sangare.

== Discography ==
=== Solo albums ===
- Moussolou (1990)
- Ko Sira (1993) (released as Bi Furu in Mali)
- Worotan (1996), Nonesuch/Warner (released as Denw in Mali)
- Laban (2001)
- Oumou (2003)
- Seya (2009)
- Mogoya (2017)
- Acoustic (2020)
- Timbuktu (2022)

=== As contributing artist ===
- The Rough Guide to World Music (1994), World Music Network
- The Rough Guide to West African Music (1995), World Music Network
- Unwired: Africa (2000), World Music Network
- "Mood 4 Eva" - The Lion King: The Gift (2019), Parkwood

== Awards and recognition ==
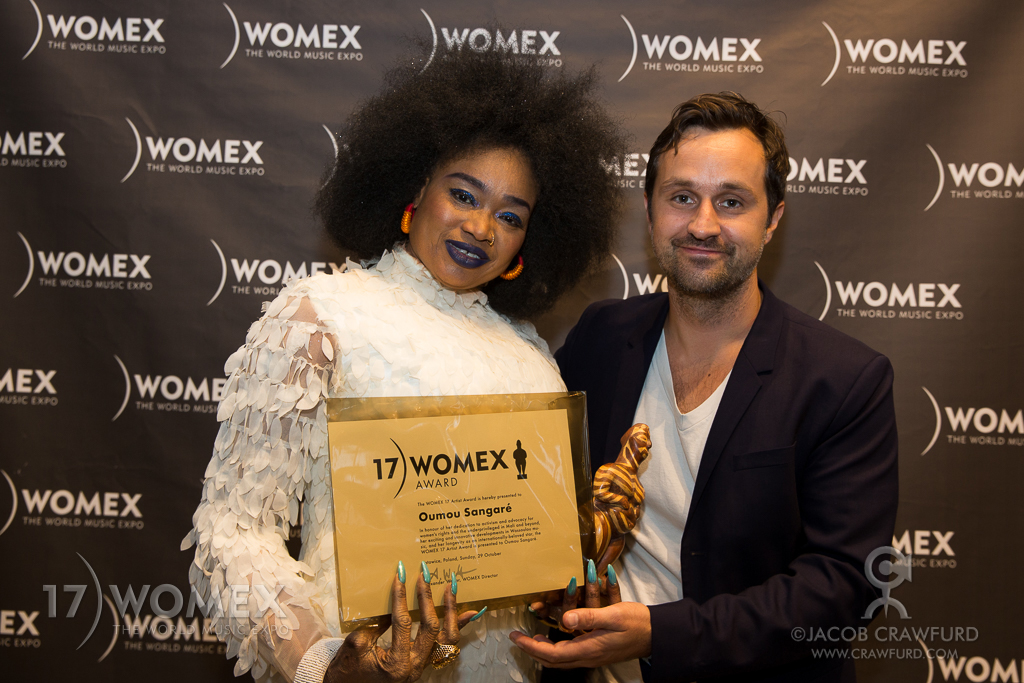
With her award at WOMEX 2017 in Katowice, Poland

- IMC-UNESCO International Music Prize (2001, performers category, jointly awarded to Gidon Kremer) for her contribution to "the enrichment and the development of music as well as for the cause of peace, for the understanding among peoples and international cooperation".
- On 16 October 2003, Sangaré was named Goodwill Ambassador of the Food and Agriculture Organization of the United Nations (FAO).
- In 2010, Sangaré's album Seya was nominated for a Grammy Award for Best Contemporary World Music Album.
- In 2011, Sangaré won a Grammy for Best Pop Collaboration With Vocals, with Herbie Hancock, Pink, India Arie, Seal, Konono Nº1 and Jeff Beck, for 'Imagine'.
- In October 2017, Sangaré won the Artist Award at WOMEX 2017 in recognition of her music and for her advocacy for women's rights.
- In April 2019, Oumou Sangaré was celebrates as a winner of the Aga Khan Music Awards for her Distinguished and Enduring Contributions to Music. She served as a member of the Aga Khan Music Awards' Master Jury in 2025.
- In 2024 she was awarded the Rolf Schock Prize.
