= Bajourou =

Malian pop music genre

Bajourou (meaning 'big strings' or 'big tune') is the name given to a strain of Malian (Mali) pop music usually played at weddings and social gatherings. Though now predominantly electric, its roots were in 60s acoustic music that borrowed patterns from the kora and the donsongoni (a hunting harp/guitar) and transferred them to acoustic guitars. Lyrics moved away from the usual Manding praise songs to more secular, romantic concerns, mainly sung by women like Fanta Sacko who did much to develop and spread the music.

== Bibliography ==
- Charry, Eric S. (2000). Mande Music: Traditional and Modern Music of the Maninka and Mandinka of Mali. Chicago: University of Chicago Press.
- Coelho, Victor (2003). The Cambridge Companion to Music. Cambridge: Cambridge University Press.
- Conrad, David (2001). Somono Bala of the Upper Niger. Leiden: BRILL.
- Eyre, Banning (2000). In Griot Time: An American Guitarist in Mali. Philadelphia: Temple University Press.
