= Ngoni (instrument) =

Traditional West African guitar

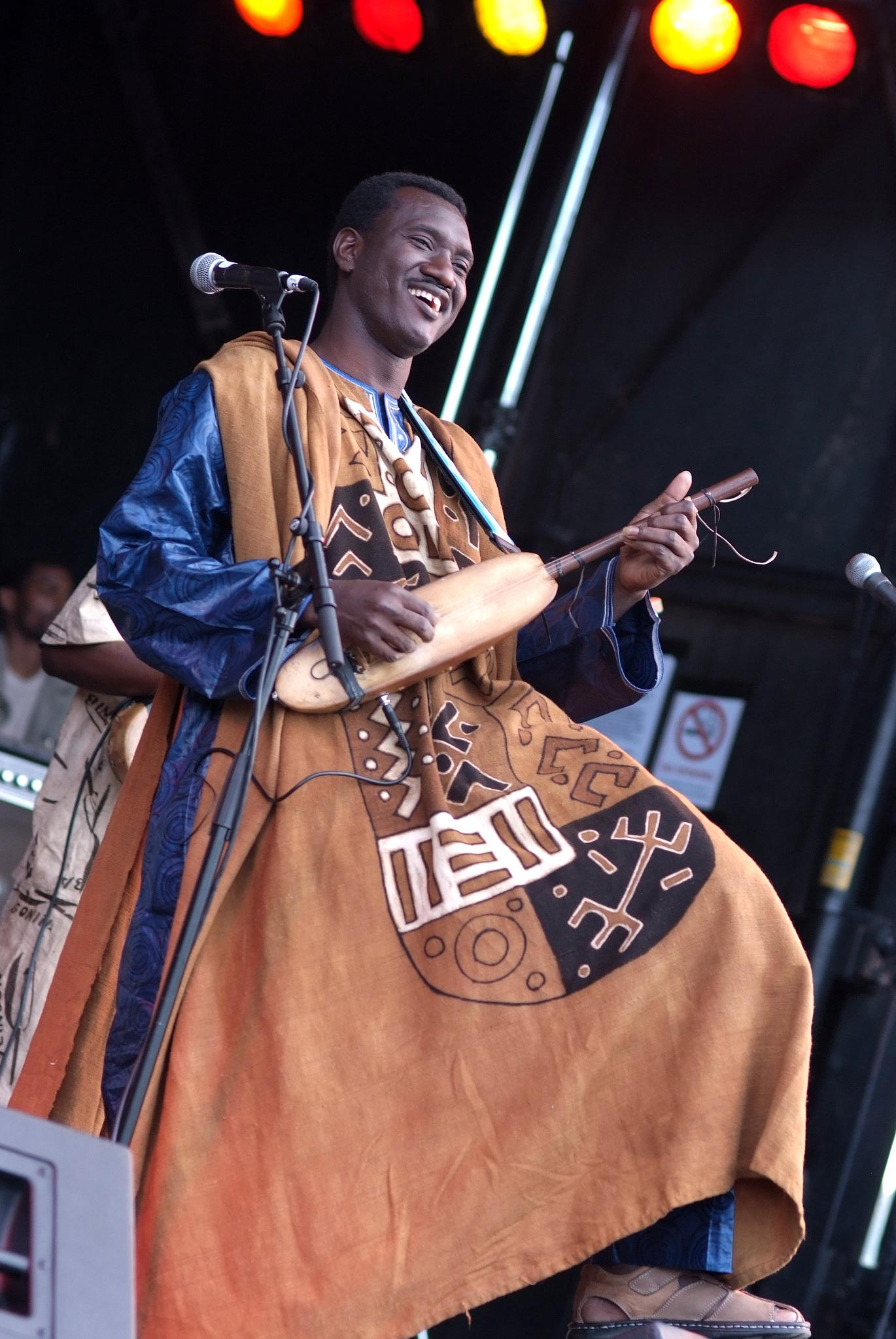
Bassekou Kouyate performing on a jeli ngoni

The ngoni (also written ngɔni, n'goni, or nkoni) is a traditional West African string instrument. Its body is made of wood or calabash with dried animal (often goat) skin head stretched over it. The ngoni, which can produce fast melodies, appears to be closely related to the akonting and the xalam. This is called a jeli ngoni as it is played by griots at celebrations and special occasions in traditional songs called fasas in Mandingo. Another larger type, believed to have originated among the donso (a hunter and storyteller caste of the Wassoulou cultural region) is called the donso ngoni. This is still largely reserved for ceremonial purposes. The donso ngoni, or "hunter's harp," has six strings. It is often accompanies singing along with the karagnan, a serrated metal tube scraped with a metal stick. The donso ngoni was mentioned by Richard Jobson in the 1620s, describing it as the most commonly used instrument in the Gambia. He described it as an instrument with a great gourd for a belly at the bottom of a long neck with six strings.

The ngoni is known to have existed since at least 1352, when Ibn Battuta, a Moroccan traveller reported seeing one in the court of Mansa Musa. It is believed to have evolved into the banjo in North America after enslaved Mandé were brought there. Battuta also reported the balafon. A book written by English musician Ramon Goose about the ngoni describes its known history, tunings and a beginner's guide to playing the instrument.

== Kamale ngoni ==
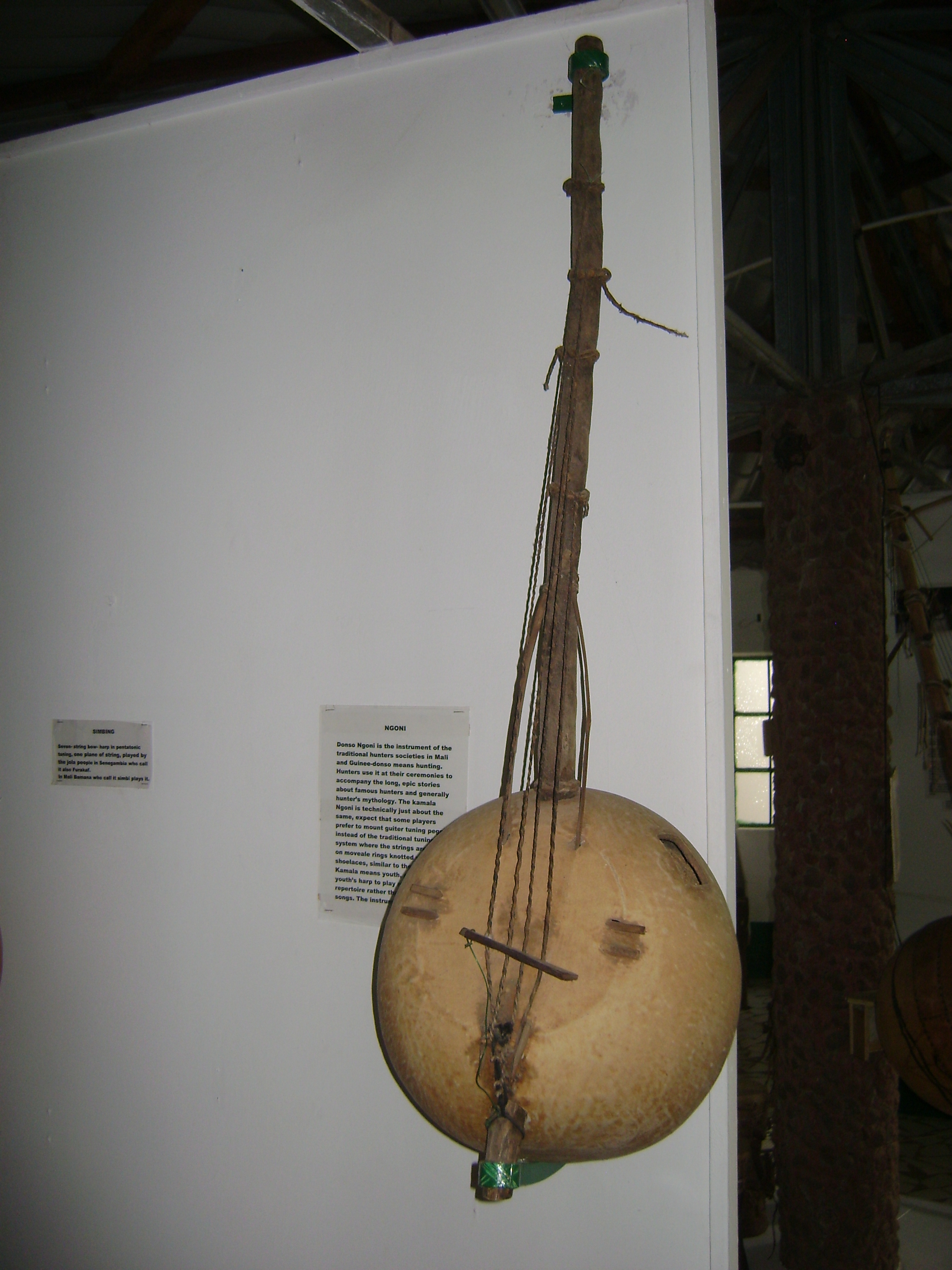
The donso ngoni (hunter's harp, shown) is similar to the kamale ngoni, but has fewer strings.

The smaller kamale ngoni or "young man's harp" is claimed to be invented by the musician Alata Brulaye around the 1950s and 1960s in Mali. It became popular in the Wassoulou region and contributed to the rise of Wassoulou music in the 1970s and 1990s.

Musicians traditionally tune this harp using pentatonic scales. There are however exceptions, such as Adama Yalomba, who are exploring new horizons and applying heptatonic scales transforming and influencing the younger generation. The kamale ngoni is smaller than, and tuned a fourth higher than, the traditional pentatonic donso ngoni, which is a predecessor of the kamale ngoni. Both the kamale ngoni and donso ngoni resemble and share their basic design with the Manding kora, but the kora has a wider range (often up to four octaves) with many more strings tuned diatonically, while the kamale ngoni and donso ngoni have ranges of around an octave (or slightly more, in the case of the kamale ngoni), and are tuned pentatonically. During decades both harps followed similar organology using a resonance body made of calabash rather than wood such as the traditional lute ngoni. This West African harp was initially played using only six strings but later that number was increased to eight, ten, twelve, fourteen, sixteen and eighteen strings.

== Notable players ==
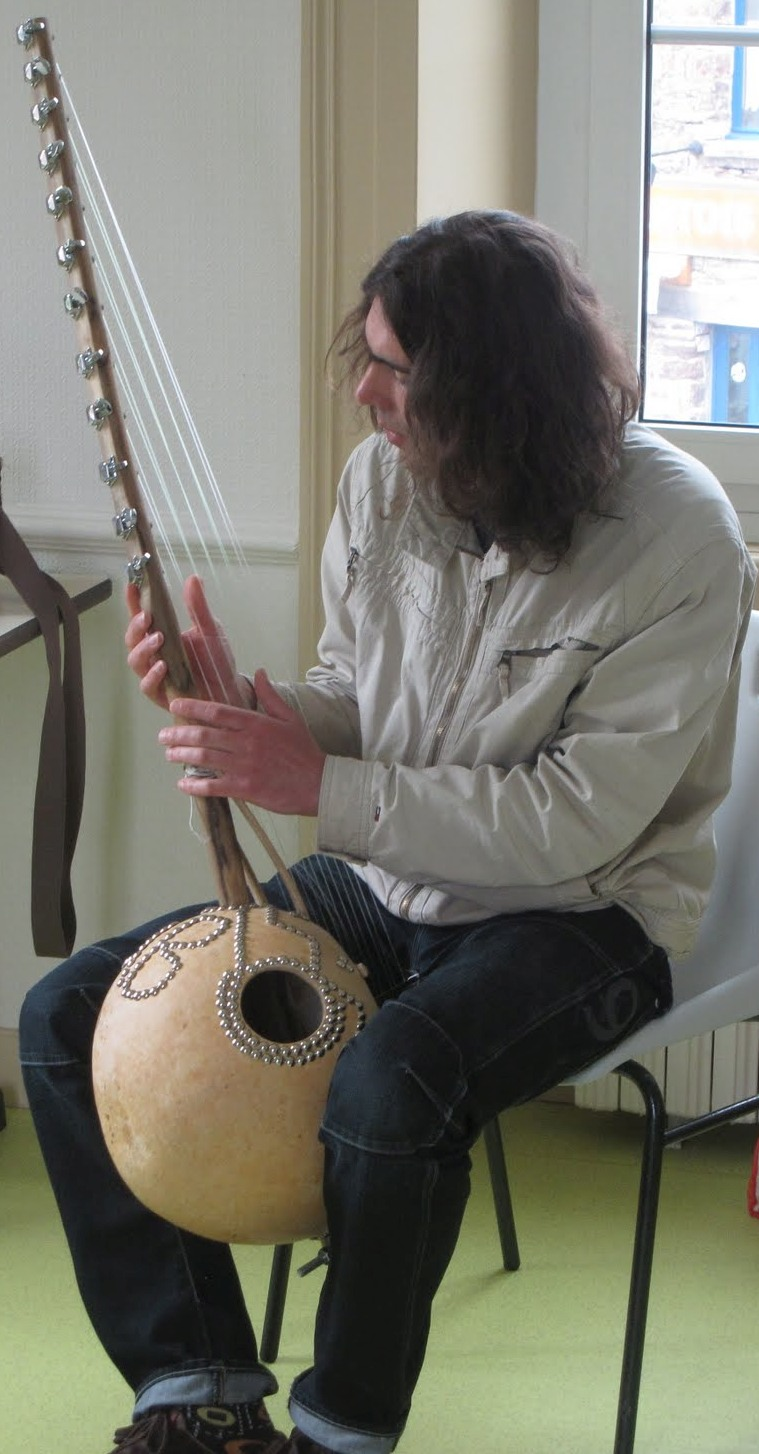
Kamele ngoni belonging to Abou Diarra

- Issa Bagayogo
- Cheick Hamala Diabaté, a Grammy nominated, internationally touring artist who also plays the banjo
- Mamah Diabaté from Rokia Traoré Band
- Adama Dicko, played a.o. with Tata Pound and Transglobal Underground
- Dicko Fils
- Mamadou Sidibé - Malian Musician
- Moriba Koïta († 2016), played with most West-African Stars
- Abdoulaye Kone from Sidi Touré Band
- Andra Kouyaté, played with his brother Bassekou Kouyate, Rokia Traoré and Tiken Jah Fakoly
- Bassekou Kouyaté, prominently with his band named Ngoni ba
- Mamadou Kouyaté, player of the little-known bass ngoni, part of Trio-Da-Kali, recorded with the Kronos Quartet, played with Roswell Rudd, Toumani Diabaté, Bassekou Kouyaté a.o., appeared at The 2013 Proms
- Ko Kan Ko Sata
- Fina Ahimsa plays kamale ngoni
- Siân Pottok plays kamale ngoni
- Yoro Sidibe plays donso ngoni
- Youssoupha Sidibe
- Baba Sissoko
- Justin Adams
- Banzumana Sissoko
- Ramon Goose
- Don Cherry, American jazz musician
- Leni Stern, American jazz guitarist who incorporates ngoni into all her current projects, including with the Mike Stern Band
- William Parker
- Joshua Abrams

== See also ==
- Xalam
- Ngoni people
