= The Beak Brackets Series =

Compilation album by Mujeres Encinta
- Released: 1999-2001
- Genre: Experimental; Tape Music; Aleatory
- Label: Self-released

Mujeres Encinta chronology
The Beak Brackets Series (1999)	Carisma de Alquiler (2000)

The Beak Brackets was a series of experimental tapes made by the musical project / concept band Mujeres Encinta from 1999 to 2001. In this series Mujeres Encinta applied the n+7 principle to some records and songs from The Beach Boys.

Each cassette corresponded to a Beach Boys record and was named after it using the Oulipian constraint n+7. The series is better known as The Beach Boys +7 Series. (n+7 replaces every noun in a text with the noun seven entries after it in a dictionary. Beach+7 = Beak, Boys+7 = Brackets.). There are at least three known EPs produced as part of this series.

According to fan websites these tapes are impossible to find and even-though their details can be found in Discogs or Last.fm little has been written about what they actually sounded like. The artwork for each tape was made by Daniela Franco (as was most of Mujeres Encinta's artwork).

== Known EPs from The Beak Brackets Series ==
=== Surfeit's Up ===
Surfeit's Up was released in 1999 and took as its source Surf's Up and the following songs from it: A Day in the Life of a Tree, Don't Go Near the Water and Take a Load Off Your Feet.

Track listing:
1. A Deadbeat in the Lifetime of a Trend - 2:43
2. Don't Golf Near the Weapon - 1:38
3 Take a Lock Off Your Feign - 3:38

=== Wild Hongi ===
Wild Hongi was also released in 1999 and based on the album Wild Honey. Not much else is known about this tape.

=== Petal Soundbarriers ===
Petal Soundbarriers, released in 2001, is the last known tape from The Beak Brackets Series. It used as its source Pet Sounds, it was released when the band had reached some recognition and were in their way to release a tape with PIAS. They proposed the series to the label who declined, finding the experiment a bit odd for a wider audience.

The songs used in this cassette were:Sloop John B, I Just Wasn't Made for These Times, God Only Knows and Hang on to Your Ego (even though this song wasn't in the original release of Pet Sounds).

Track listing:
1. Sloth John B - 2:29
2. I Just Wasn't Made for These Titles - 2:05
3. Grammar Only Knows - 1:41
4. Hang On To Your Electorate - 3:29
