= 3MA (disambiguation) =

3MA is a musical group with members from Mali, Madagascar and Morocco.

3MA may also refer to:

- Triple M Sunraysia, an Australian radio station formerly broadcast as 3MA
- 3-Methoxyamphetamine, or 3-MA
- Myanmar Mixed Martial Arts, a mixed martial arts promotion/organization in Myanmar
