= Driss El Maloumi =

Moroccan composer and oud player

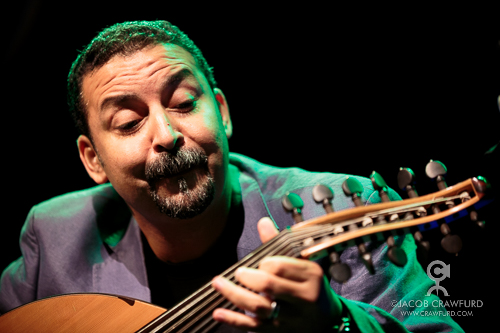
- Driss El Maloumi

Background information
- Born: 25 May 1970 (age 55)
- Origin: Agadir, Morocco
- Genres: Arabic music, Berber music, African popular music
- Occupations: oud player; composer; singer
- Years active: 1990–present
- Website: Official webpage

Driss El Maloumi (born 25 May 1970) is a Moroccan composer and performer on the oud, the Arabic short-necked lute. He is mainly known for playing solo or in trio formations under his own name, for his long-standing cooperation with Catalan musician and musical director Jordi Savall, as well as for being a member of the group 3MA, comprising three popular African string instrumentalists.

== Life and artistic career ==
El Maloumi was born in Agadir, in southern Morocco, and comes from a Berber family. After studying Arabic literature at Ibn Zohr University in Agadir, he finished his academic studies with a thesis on the philosophical approach to musical expression in artistic discourse. At the same time, he devoted himself to practical training on the oud and to his studies in both Arabic and Western classical music. In the early 1990s, he won several national awards for the oud, for example the Prix d'Honneur from the National Conservatory of Music in Rabat. Apart from his work as musician, he directs the conservatory of music in Agadir.

In several of his musical projects dedicated to musical affinities between Europe and the Mediterranean, musical director Jordi Savall invited Driss El Maloumi to his ensemble Hespèrion XXI to represent Middle Eastern musical traditions with his oud playing.

With his solo performances, El Maloumi has presented his own compositions, as well as the occasional Berber folk tune. Further, he has been invited to play with international musicians coming from backgrounds as varied as jazz, Indian music or the historical music of Al-Andalus. He also appears with his own trio, including two percussionists from Agadir, and was invited to play at the Institut du Monde arabe in Paris in 2013. In 2014, he participated at WOMEX festival in Santiago de Compostela, Spain, and the following year, at the International Africa Festival in Würzburg, Germany.

In 2023, his album Aswat (Sounds) was distinguished with the German Record Critics’ Award in the category Traditional Ethnic music. This album was by online magazine World Music Central for its "brilliant call and response interaction" between El Maloumi's oud and "captivating North Africa and Middle Eastern percussion."

El Maloumi also composed orchestral versions of his music for oud, percussion and symphony orchestra, titled Tafassil (Details). For 30 November 2023, the Driss El Maloumi Trio, accompanied by the Austrian Tonkünstler orchestra, are scheduled to perform at the prestigious Musikverein concert hall in Vienna.

== 3MA African string trio ==
Since 2008, El Maloumi has been a member of 3MA musical group, an award-winning trio of African string instruments, playing their own contemporary compositions. The other members are kora player Ballaké Sissoko from Mali and Rajery from Madagascar on valiha.

In his review of 3MA's first album, entitled 3MA - Madagascar, Mali, Maroc, British music critic Charlie Gillett named their music "satisfyingly unclassifiable", and world music magazine Songlines, where the album reached the highest position in its world music charts, qualified the trio's style as "African Chamber Music".

Apart from their own albums, the musicians of 3MA have also participated in the musical project The Routes of Slavery. They were invited to join their compositions, relating to the history of the slave trade from Africa, by the artistic director of this project, Jordi Savall, with whom Driss El Maloumi has played the oud on numerous albums.

== Discography ==
Solo or with his own trio

- Maroc: L'âme Dansée (Buda Records, 2003)
- Makan (Contre-jour, 2013)
- Aswat (Contre-jour, 2023)

with Jordi Savall's Hespèrion XXI

- Orient — Occident, 1200-1700 (2006) and several other albums
- The Routes of Slavery, DVD and 2 CDs with booklet, (2016)

with 3MA

- 3MA (2008), Transglobal World Music Charts in January 2008
- Anarouz (2017), Songlines Music Awards 2019

on CD "Songlines Top of the World" (2014)

- Douceur pour 2 'R', from his album Makan

== Awards ==
- 2016: Chevalier des Arts et des Lettres

== See also ==
- 3MA musical group
- Music of Morocco
