= Dudu Phukwana and the "Spears" =

Studio album by Dudu Pukwana and the "Spears"
- Released: 1969; 2020
- Recorded: 1968 and 1969
- Studio: Sound Techniques, London
- Genre: Cape jazz
- Label: Quality; LTJ-S 232; Matsuli Music; MM115
- Producer: Joe Boyd (1969 release); Chris Albertyn and Matt Temple (2020 reissue)

Dudu Pukwana chronology
Dudu Phukwana and the "Spears" (1969)	In the Townships (1974)

Dudu Phukwana and the "Spears" is the debut album by South African saxophonist Dudu Pukwana and his band, the "Spears." Produced by Joe Boyd, it was recorded in 1968 at Sound Techniques in London, and was initially released on vinyl in 1969 by Quality Records, a subsidiary of the Trutone label. In 2020, the album was remastered and reissued by Matsuli Music as a double-LP set with nine previously unissued tracks that were recorded in 1969, and that feature a number of guest artists such as Fairport Convention's Richard Thompson and Simon Nicol.

Pukwana's name was misspelled on the album cover despite the fact that the master tape boxes bear the correct spelling. Identification of personnel on the recordings was largely based on educated guesses by liner note author Richard Haslop, as session notes could not be located.

== Reception ==
Professional ratings
Review scores
Source	Rating
Financial Times	5/5 stars
Jazz Journal	4/5 stars
Tom Hull – on the Web	B+
UK Vibe	5/5 stars

Regarding the 2020 reissue, Jazz Journal's Brian Morton wrote: "The South African influence on British jazz is immeasurable and still evolving. The reappearance of this now-remote LP marks a moment for new reflection on a complex legacy, and a story criss-crossed by hope, tragedy, great longing and an irrepressible zest for life and music."

In a review for Financial Times, David Honigmann called the original release "one of the unheralded classics of South African jazz," and described the additional tracks as "a happily discovered treasure."

Tyler Wilcox of Aquarium Drunkard commented: "A total blast of positive vibrations from way back in the 1960s... Pukwana is rightly the star here and his playing is luminous and joyful throughout; you can't listen to this collection without it improving your mood considerably."

Writing for UK Vibe, Brian Homer noted the album's "compelling historical and cultural value," and remarked: "If anyone thinks that no jazz these days can make you feel good and want to get up and dance then they had better listen to this record... All the music is impressive, insistent and infectious... It's worthy of being a museum piece except that the music is too alive and vital for that."

In an article for New Frame, Gwen Ansell called the tracks on the original release "a delight for 2020 ears," and noted that "in the incomplete jigsaw puzzle that is South African jazz history, every reissue adds a vital missing piece." She stated that the music "tell[s] of the formative years of a brilliant composer: songs such as 'Kuthwasi Hlobo' stick in the memory, heralding the simultaneously nostalgic and hopeful power of In the Townships, created six years later."

== 2020 reissue track listings ==
Disc 1

1. "Pezulu (Way Up)" – 5:54
2. "Thulula (Fill It Up)" – 3:20
3. "Kuthwasi Hlobo (Spring)" – 3:37
4. "Half Moon" – 3:40
5. "Yini Njalo (Stick Around)" – 2:16
6. "Kwa Thula (Thula's Place)" – 3:41
7. "Joe's Jika (Joe's Groove)" – 3:46
8. "Nobomvu (Red Head)" – 5:02
9. "Qonqoza (Knock)" – 4:42
10. "Phola (Cool It!)" – 3:31

Disc 1 personnel

Confirmed:

- Dudu Pukwana – alto saxophone
- Bob Stuckey – organ and bass pedals
- Louis Moholo – drums

Likely:

- Teddy Osei – tenor sax
- Mongezi Feza – trumpet
- Phil Lee – guitar
- Chris McGregor – piano
- Harry Miller – bass

Possible:

- Dudu Pukwana – tenor sax and piano
- Jonas Gwangwa – trombone
- Remi Kabaka – drums or percussion
- Jimmy Scott – percussion
- Tunji Oyelana – drums or percussion

Disc 2

1. "Pezulu (Extended Take)" – 6:23
2. "Pezulu (Alternate Take)" – 5:47
3. "Studio Interlude" – 0:17
4. "Half Moon" – 3:39
5. "Zulu Liyaduduma" – 3:32
6. "Sibuyile (Take One)" – 2:29
7. "Sibuyile (Take Two)" – 2:24
8. "Church Mouse" – 2:46
9. "Untitled (Andromeda)" – 2:49

Disc 2 personnel

Confirmed:

- Dudu Pukwana – alto saxophone
- Mongezi Feza – trumpet
- Richard Thompson – guitar
- Simon Nicol – guitar
- Bob Stuckey – organ and bass pedals
- Harry Miller – bass
- Louis Moholo – drums
- Joe Mogotsi – vocals

Likely:

- Teddy Osei – tenor sax
- Phil Lee – guitar
- Chris McGregor – piano
- Mamsie (Mthombeni) Gwangwa – vocals

Possible:

- Dudu Pukwana – tenor sax
- Jonas Gwangwa – trombone
- Remi Kabaka – drums or percussion
- Jimmy Scott – percussion
- Tunji Oyelana – drums or percussion
