= Mujeres Encinta =

Musical group

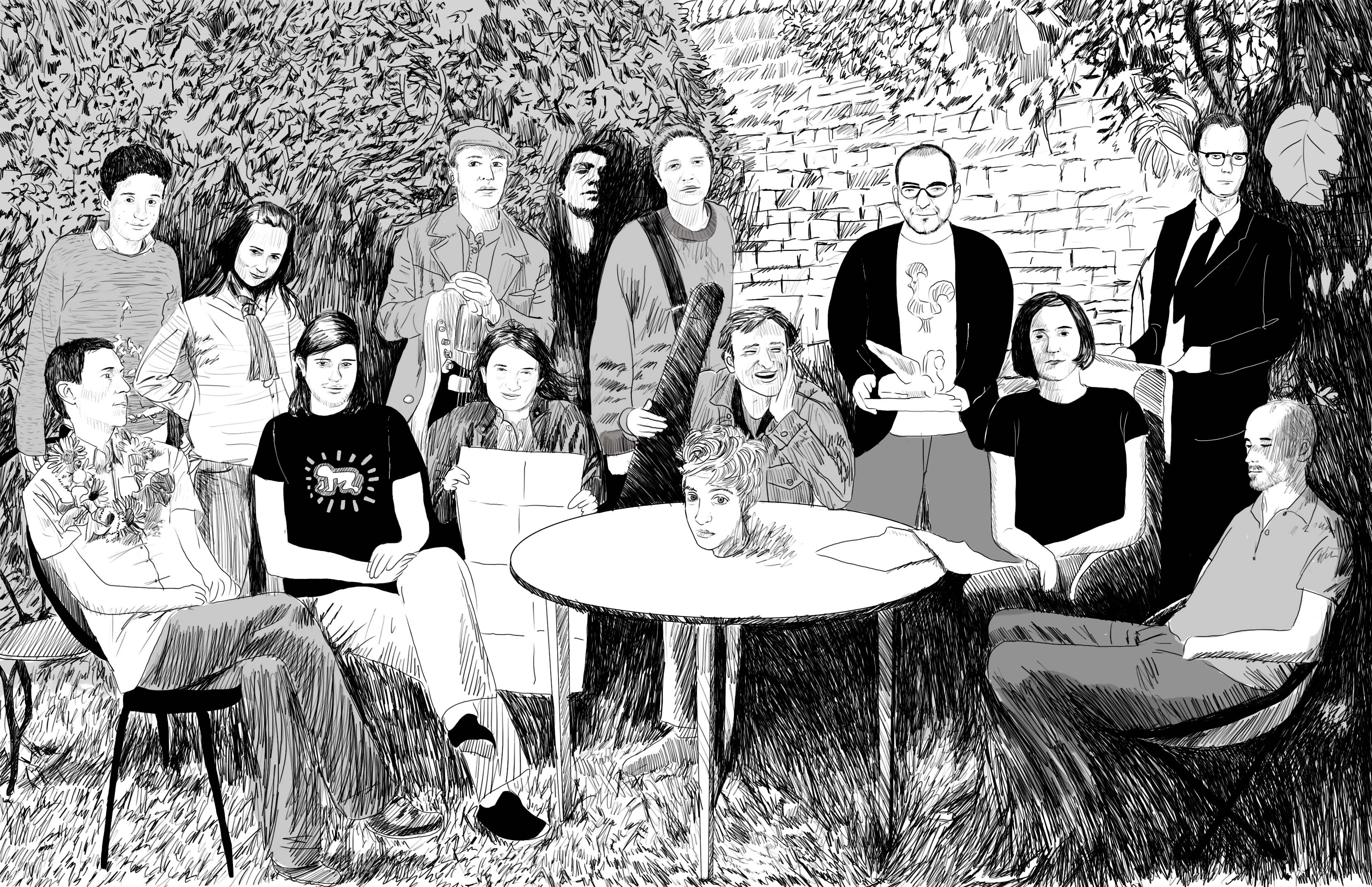
- Mujeres Encinta by José Manuel Hortelano-Pi (based on the collage of the Oulipo made by Robert Massin).

Background information
- Origin: Brighton, Madrid, Mexico, Paris, San Francisco
- Genres: Experimental, alternative dance, indie pop
- Years active: 1999-2002
- Labels: PIAS

Mujeres Encinta was a short-lived musical project / concept band known for recording only on cassette. They sang in English, Spanish and French and wrote most of their songs in collaboration. The wide range of background and musical styles of its members was both conducive for their originality and richness as a project, as well as one of the main reasons for their break-up. Despite the fact that they released cassettes with known labels, they remain an obscure band known mainly to artsy crowds.

== Lineup ==
Mujeres Encinta was also known for their many fluctuating international members. The line-up often changed according to the city where the band was playing or recording and the availability of its members. Most of them were already part of other bands.

The following musicians were, at some point between 1999 and 2002, members of Mujeres Encinta: M. C. Schmidt from Matmos, Ros Murray bassist with Electrelane, Genís Segarra from Spanish indie pop bands Astrud and Hidrogenesse, visual artist Daniela Franco, Camilo Lara from Instituto Mexicano del Sonido, Eduardo Leal de la Gala bassist with Wreckless Eric and Les Tétines Noires, Beto Cabrera, former drummer of the Mexican band Zoé, Oulipian member and reviews editor for The Believer, Daniel Levin Becker, and French cellist Vincent Ségal. As well as several members of bands from the Spanish Indie Pop scene such as Espanto and Las Pulpas.

== Discography ==
Mujeres Encinta released a number of cassettes and singles, some self-released, others across a variety of labels. They were a prolific band and, given the fact that all of their recordings were analog and on limited edition, their tapes are hard to find and keep track of.

=== Albums ===
- 2000: It Was Delicious Losing You
- 2001: Carisma de Alquiler.
- 2002: We have won! Haven't we?

=== EP/Singles ===
- 1999: Surfeit's Up (The Beak Brackets Series)
- 1999: Wild Hongi (The Beak Brackets Series)
- 2001: Petal Soundbarriers (The Beak Brackets Series)
- 2001: Noa Noa
