= Vincent Ségal =

French cellist and bassist

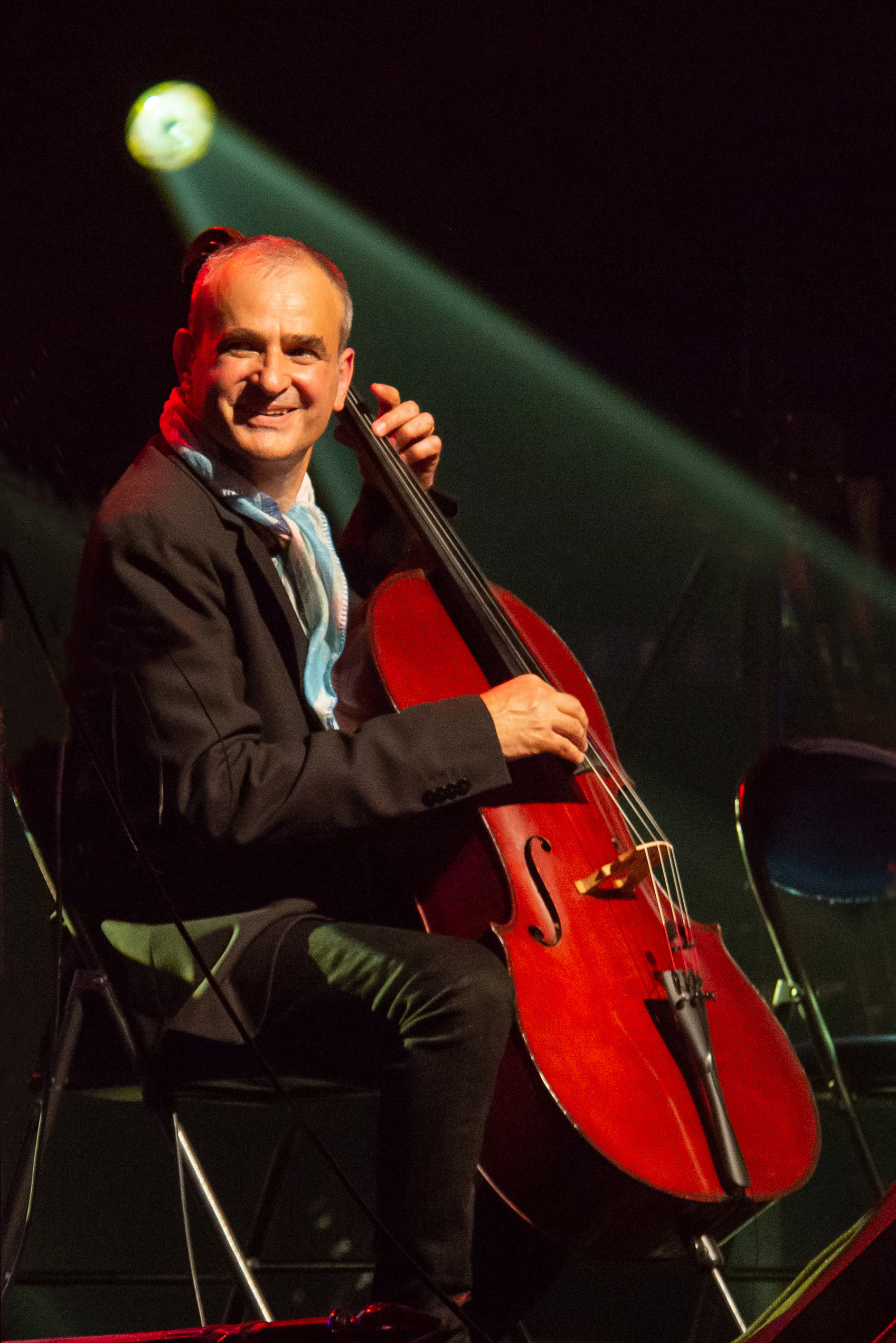
Ségal performing in 2021.

Vincent Ségal (born 1967 in Reims, France) is a French cellist and bassist.

He studied at the National Music Academy of Lyon and the Banff Centre for the Arts in Canada. He is mainly known for the variety of his collaborations and unusual projects. He has worked with Steve Nieve, Elvis Costello, Cesária Évora, Blackalicious, Carlinhos Brown, the French reggae band Tryo, Franck Monnet, the experimental project Mujeres Encinta, Georges Moustaki or with Alexandre Desplat in the O.S.T. of Lust, Caution and other of his films.

In 1986 he and Cyril Atef and formed the band Bumcello, a downtempo electronica duo that won the Victoires de la Musique award and was named Electronic artist of the year 2006. He played on every Matthieu Chedid (-M-) album. In 2009 he worked with Sting on his album If on a Winter's Night.... In October of the same year he recorded, in the studio of Salif Keïta in Mali, the album Chamber Music with Ballaké Sissoko

== Discography ==
=== As leader ===
- 2002: T-Bone Guarnerius
- 2007: Cello

With Bumcello

- 1999: Bumcello
- 2001: Booty Time
- 2002: Nude for Love
- 2003: Get Me (live)
- 2005: Animal sophistiqué
- 2008: Lychee Queen
- 2012: Al

=== Collaborations ===
With Ballaké Sissoko

- 2009: Chamber Music
- 2015: Musique de Nuit
- 2023: Les Égarés

With -M-

- 1997: Le Baptême
- 1999: Je dis aime
- 2003: Qui de nous deux

With Mujeres Encinta

- 1999: Wild Hongi (The Beak Brackets Series)
- 2001: Carisma de Alquiler

With Dick Annegarn

- 1999: Adieu verdure
- 2000: Au cirque d'hiver (label Tôt ou tard)

With Blackalicious

- 2002: Blazing arrow
- 2005: The Craft

With Piers Faccini

- 2003: Leave No Trace
- 2014: Songs of Time Lost

With others

- 1996: Olympic Gramofon with Olympic Gramofon
- 1997: Cabo Verde by Cesaria Evora
- 1997: AlphaGamabetiZado by Carlinhos Brown
- 2000: Bliss by Vanessa Paradis
- 2002: Climax by Alain Bashung
- 2003: Black Orpheus (Neptune) by Keziah Jones
- 2003: Cruel Smile by Elvis Costello
- 2004: Zenzile & Jamika meet Cello by Zenzile
- 2004: Douze fois par an by Jeanne Cherhal
- 2006: Libido by Brigitte Fontaine
- 2006: Navega by Mayra Andrade
- 2007: 33 1/3 by Susheela Raman
- 2009: If on a Winter's Night... by Sting
- 2010: Comme la rencontre fortuite... with Jean-Jacques Birgé
- 2010: Révélations with Jean-Jacques Birgé
- 2011: Dans tous ses états with Jean-Jacques Birgé and Antonin-Tri Hoang
- 2013: Dans tous les sens du terme with Jean-Jacques Birgé and Antonin-Tri Hoang
- 2013: Dépaysages Côté Court with Jean-Jacques Birgé, Antonin-Tri Hoang and Jacques Perconte
- 2018: The Journey with Lionel Loueke
- 2020: Pique-nique au labo by Jean-Jacques Birgé
- 2021: She Walks in Beauty by Warren Ellis and Marianne Faithfull
