= Lucy Durán =

British ethnomusicologist, record producer and radio presenter

Lucy Durán is a British ethnomusicologist, record producer and radio presenter. In the 1980s, Durán worked as a curator at the British Library National Sound Archive. She joined SOAS University of London in 1993, and is Professor of Music with special reference to Africa and Cuba, in the School of Arts. She is the daughter of Spanish composer and civil war veteran Gustavo Durán and the sister of poet Jane Duran and author Cheli Duran.

She was the regular presenter of BBC Radio 3's world music programme World Routes for its duration on air from 2000-2013, and featured programmes about traditional music recorded on location in countries as diverse as Madagascar, Equatorial Guinea, Paraguay and Albania.

Durán is the record producer of over twenty albums, featuring leading African musicians including Malian Kora player Toumani Diabaté: Kaira, Djelika, Songhai 2, New Ancient Strings (Toumani Diabate with Ballaké Sissoko), and Toumani & Sidiki [Grammy nominated]; Kulanjan (with Taj Mahal and Toumani Diabaté) cited in 2008 by Barack Obama as his favourite listening while campaigning for US President; Malian singer Kasse Mady Diabaté Kassi Kasse [Grammy nominated]; and ngoni player Bassekou Kouyaté Segu Blue, and I Speak Fula [Grammy nominated]. Other artists she has produced include singer-songwriter Manecas Costa from Guinea Bissau: Paraiso di Gumbe, and the 2017 collaboration between the Malian group Trio Da Kali with the Kronos Quartet. The album Ladilikan which she co-produced with Nick Gold and David Harrington, released on World Circuit Records, received international critical acclaim and many awards. Her latest release is Foronto Afroaxaca, featuring Afromexican music from the Costa Region of Oaxaca, Mexico, recorded on location in 2016 for the Mexican label Xquenda, a unique project to raise awareness of the little known community of Mexicans of African descent on the Pacific coast.

From 2009–2012 she was the director of a film-based project funded by a grant from the Arts and Humanities Research Council, entitled Growing into Music. She filmed and directed three documentaries in Mali and Guinea about how children from jeli (griot) families in Mali learn musical skills and knowledge informally through oral transmission. One of the films, The Voice of Tradition: Bako Dagnon and her family in 2015 was awarded 'Best AHRC-funded film since 1998'. Her most recent film is Tegere Tulon: Handclapping Songs of Mali, featuring the process of researching and creating new composition by the singer Hawa Kassé Mady Diabaté, filmed on location in Mali by Moustapha Diallo (Macina Films). It was commissioned by the Kronos Quartet for their "Fifty For The Future" project, designed to create new repertoire for string quartet, and premiered at the Kronos Quartet festival in San Francisco Jazz Center, on 1 June 2019. Durán was inducted into the Kronos Hall of Fame in the same month.

Durán has been research consultant on many documentary and fiction films for television and the big screen, including the BBC Under African Skies: Mali, and Bamako Beat (broadcast on the BBC in 1990). She was advisor to Roots (the remake of the TV series for the History Channel and BBC 4) on Mandinka language, culture and music, also creating several original compositions for the early sequences of the series including the "Slave Rebellion" song on board the slave ship, and the "Mandinka Ringshout". Durán was music consultant for The Boy Who Harnessed The Wind by director Chiwetel Ejiofor (Netflix, 2019).

Durán's academic publications include many articles and book chapters covering aspects of Mande music, including the kora and women singers of Mali.
