= Matsuli Music =

South African independent record label

Matsuli Music is an independent record label based in London that specialises in the reissue and archival release of jazz and related South African music. The label is known for issuing previously unavailable or little-known material but has also released a limited number of contemporary recordings.

The label has generally released a small number of titles, often accompanied by newly commissioned liner notes and historical documentation. Releases have appeared on vinyl, as well as digitally, with a significant proportion of sales occurring outside South Africa.

== Notable releases ==
=== Archival releases ===
- African Songbird by Sathima Bea Benjamin with Dollar Brand.
- Inhlupeko: Distress by The Soul Jazzmen.
- Live in Lesotho by Hugh Masekela & Company.
- Dudu Pukwana and the "Spears" by Dudu Pukwana and the "Spears".
- Batsumi by Batsumi.
- Sangoma by Malombo.

=== New releases ===
- One Night on Earth: Music from the Strings of Mali by Derek Gripper.
- Tolika Mtoliki by The Brother Moves On.
- After the Night, the Day Will Surely Come by Kyle Shepherd.
- A Dance More Sweetly Played by the Kyle Shepherd Trio.
- Ballaké Sissoko & Derek Gripper by Ballaké Sissoko and Derek Gripper.
