= Chamber Music (Ballake Sissoko and Vincent Segal album) =

2009 album by Ballaké Sissoko and Vincent Segal

Chamber Music is an album by Ballaké Sissoko and Vincent Segal. It was released in 2009 by the French label No Format! and in 2011 by the U.S. label Six Degrees Records. The result of a close collaboration between the two friends and musicians, it melds Sissoko's traditional kora playing with Segal's trip hop infused approach to the classical cello.

Chamber Music has been described as a work of quiet beauty and soulful simplicity.

== Background ==
Hailing from a long tradition of Malian kora players, Sissoko has worked with renowned musicians such as Toumani Diabaté and Taj Mahal. He met the French born Segal by chance, and the two began jamming together, uncertain of what kind of music might result. As a former member of the French National Orchestra, Segal's Western classical training does not prevent him from exploring a wide variety of extended techniques, rendering his cello a flexible partner to Sissoko's kora. A childhood spent in the Pigalle district of Paris surrounded by immigrant communities exposed Segal to African music from an early age. As such, he possesses a natural sensitivity to Sissoko's West-African style.

An open improvisational spirit marks the otherwise composed works of Chamber Music, with each musicians contributing individual compositions as well participating in a joint endeavor of sonic exploration. In previous collaborations as in this one, both Sissoko and Ségal emphasize the modern adaptability of their respective instruments, Sissoko through his preference for eclectic collaborations over solo endeavors and Segal through his work with the dub/trip hop Bumcello.

== Recording Details ==
The album was recorded over the course of three sessions at Salif Keita's Studio Mouffou in Bamako. No overdubs were used, and while most of the tracks feature only Sissoko and Segal, musical contributions were made by Awa Sangho on vocals, Mahamadou Kamissoko on ngoni, Fassery Diabaté on balafon, and Demba Camara on bolon.

== Critical reception ==
There is a general consensus among critics that the collaboration between Sissoko and Segal has successfully merged their culturally distinct musical visions into a rousing hybrid. Chamber Music holds up on the strength of its creators' ability to understand each other's musical languages without resorting to overwrought instrumental embellishments or electronic manipulation. The minimalism of the arrangements serves to showcase each musician's sensitivity to the points of convergence between their respective instruments. Although such a collaboration is neither unusual nor groundbreaking at this point in the history of musical hybrids, a pairing that may have seemed awkward at first manages to produce spellbinding results. Altogether, Chamber Music strikes a fine balance in which the musical cultures of West Africa and Western Europe meet on equal terms.

== Track listing ==
All songs composed by Ballaké Sissoko except 2, 5 and 6 composed by Vincent Segal

1. "Chamber Music" - 5:31
2. "Oscarine" - 5:41
3. "Houdesti" - 8:52
4. "Wo Yé N'Gnougobine" - 5:51
5. "Histoire de Molly" - 5:31
6. "'Ma-Ma' FC" - 5:12
7. "Regret-À Kader Barry" - 3:45
8. "Halinkata Djoubé" - 5:08
9. "Future" - 3:15
10. "Mako Mady" - 6:06

== Personnel ==
- Ballaké Sissoko – kora
- Vincent Segal – cello

Guests:

- Lead vocal on "Regret" – Awa Sanagho
- Ngoni on "Houdesti" – Mahamadou Kamissoko
- Balafon on "Houdesti" – Fassery Diabate
- Bolon on "Oscarine," "Halinkata Djoubé," and "Mako Mady"; karignan on "'Ma-Ma' FC," "Regret-À Kader Barry" – Demba Camara
