= Derek Gripper =

South African classical guitarist (born 1977)

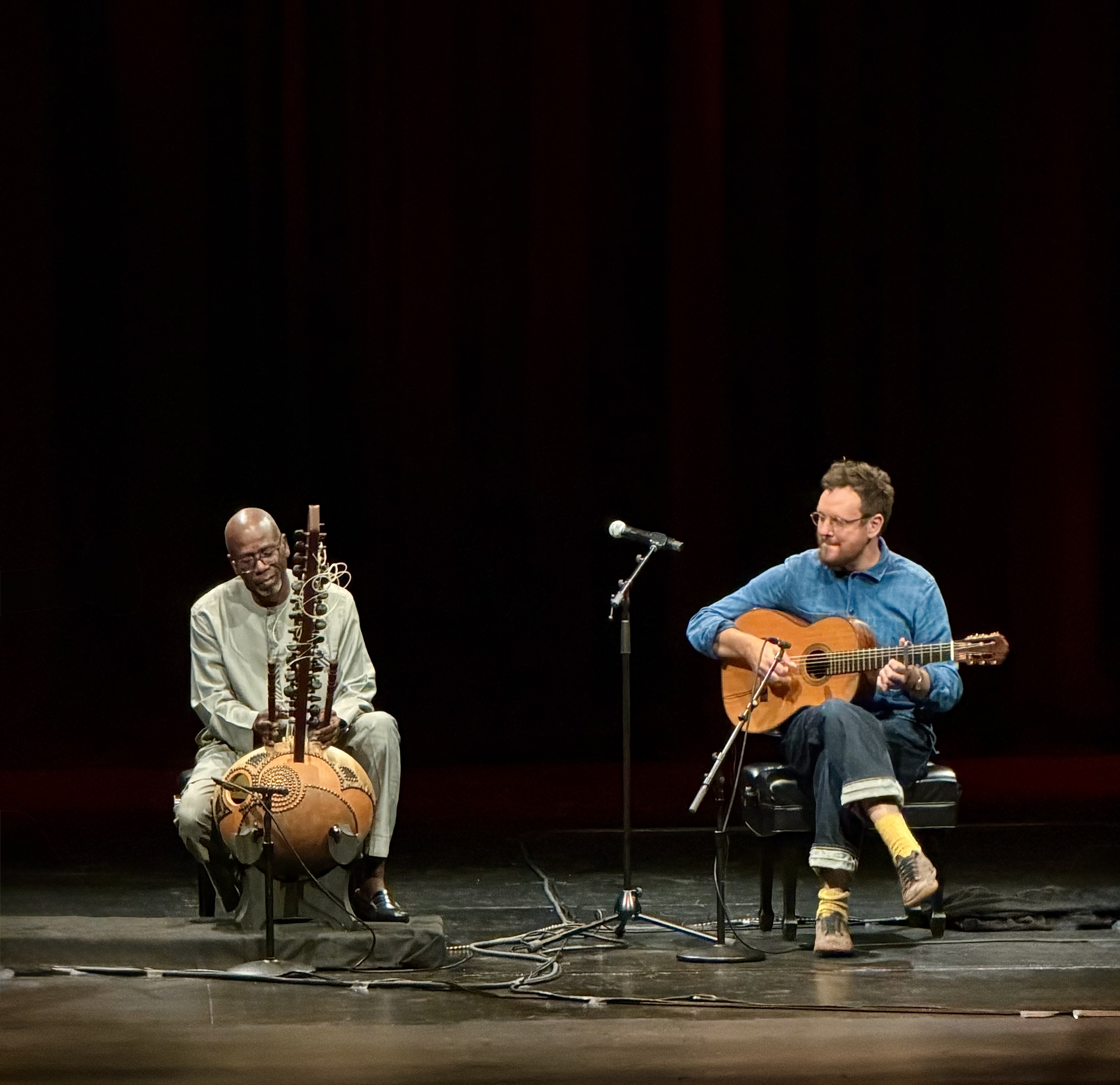
- Gripper performing with Sissoko (2026)

Background information
- Born: November 14, 1977 (age 48); Cape Town, South Africa
- Education: South African College of Music; University of Cape Town
- Genres: World; Blues; Malian folk
- Occupation: Guitarist
- Labels: Platoon; New Cape Records; Matsuli Music

Derek Gripper (born November 14, 1977) is a South African classical guitarist. He is known for transcribing West African music made for the 21-string kora to the six-string guitar, with a focus on the traditional music of Mali. He has collaborated extensively with notable musicians including John Williams, Toumani Diabaté, and Ballaké Sissoko.

== Early life and education ==
Gripper was born in Cape Town in 1977. He began his formal musical training on the violin at age six and studied classical music for thirteen years. As a teenager, he became interested in guitar and bass and began playing in bands around Cape Town.

He attended the South African College of Music at the University of Cape Town, where he studied classical guitar. At age nineteen, at a teacher's behest, he learned Andrés Segovia's transcription of the Bach Partita for Violin No. 2 and played the Chaconne for Carlos Bonell and Nikita Koshkin. Bonell impressed upon Gripper the idea of using the guitar to express a broad range of sound, including from different instruments. He was also introduced to the 8-string music of Paul Galbraith by Jonathan Leathwood.

After college, he traveled to southern India to study Carnatic music.

== Career ==
After an encounter with the late Alex van Heerden, a jazz trumpeter from Cape Town, Gripper started studying playing techniques from cultures outside of South Africa. In 2002, the two released their first recording, Sagtevlei, developing a new style of melodic and improvisational Cape music dubbed "avant-goema" by the press.

In 2009, he began studying traditional Malian compositions for kora and discovered he could play complex, virtuosic compositions by Toumani Diabaté without omitting original notes by using techniques from the Spanish vihuela, a lute from the Renaissance. He began to make arrangements of Diabaté's music in 2012.

Beginning in the late 2000s, he undertook the task of producing full guitar transcriptions of kora repertoire. He developed techniques to reproduce the instrument's simultaneous bass, accompaniment, and melodic lines on the guitar.

Gripper met Ballaké Sissoko in Paris in 2022. Despite not sharing a common language, the two began performing and improvising together across dozens of concerts and engagements internationally. He has also contributed to research on ethnomusicology in South Africa and West Africa.

=== Style ===
Gripper's approach involves rendering the kora's interlocking rhythmic and melodic structures on a six-string classical guitar while retaining the cyclical forms and contrapuntal textures of the original repertoire.

The Financial Times described Gripper's guitar technique as creating a dialogue between instruments rather than a substitution, noting the clarity with which distinct musical lines are articulated. Songlines has similarly emphasised the restraint of his playing, highlighting an avoidance of virtuosic display in favour of fidelity to source material. Reviewers have also noted the influence of Western classical guitar traditions, Brazilian music, and minimalist approaches to structure and repetition, contributing to a style frequently described as precise and restrained.

== Critical reception ==
Gripper's recordings have received attention in international music criticism for their technical precision and serious engagement with African musical traditions. Reviewing his solo album One Night on Earth: Music from the Strings of Mali, critics noted both the complexity of the kora repertoire he transcribed and the musicality with which he executed it. Banning Eyre described the album as "astounding, not just for its technical brilliance, but its musicality".

The collaborative album Ballaké Sissoko and Derek Gripper was warmly reviewed in publications such as Financial Times, Le Monde, and the Mail & Guardian.

== Discography ==
=== Albums ===
- Blomdoorns (2003).
- One Night on Earth: Music from the Strings of Mali (2015).
- Libraries on Fire (2016).
- A Year of Swimming (2020).
- Billy Goes to Durban (2021).
- Sleep Songs for My Daughter (2022).
- Ballaké Sissoko and Derek Gripper (with Ballaké Sissoko, 2024).
