= Francesca Beard =

Malaysian writer and performance poet

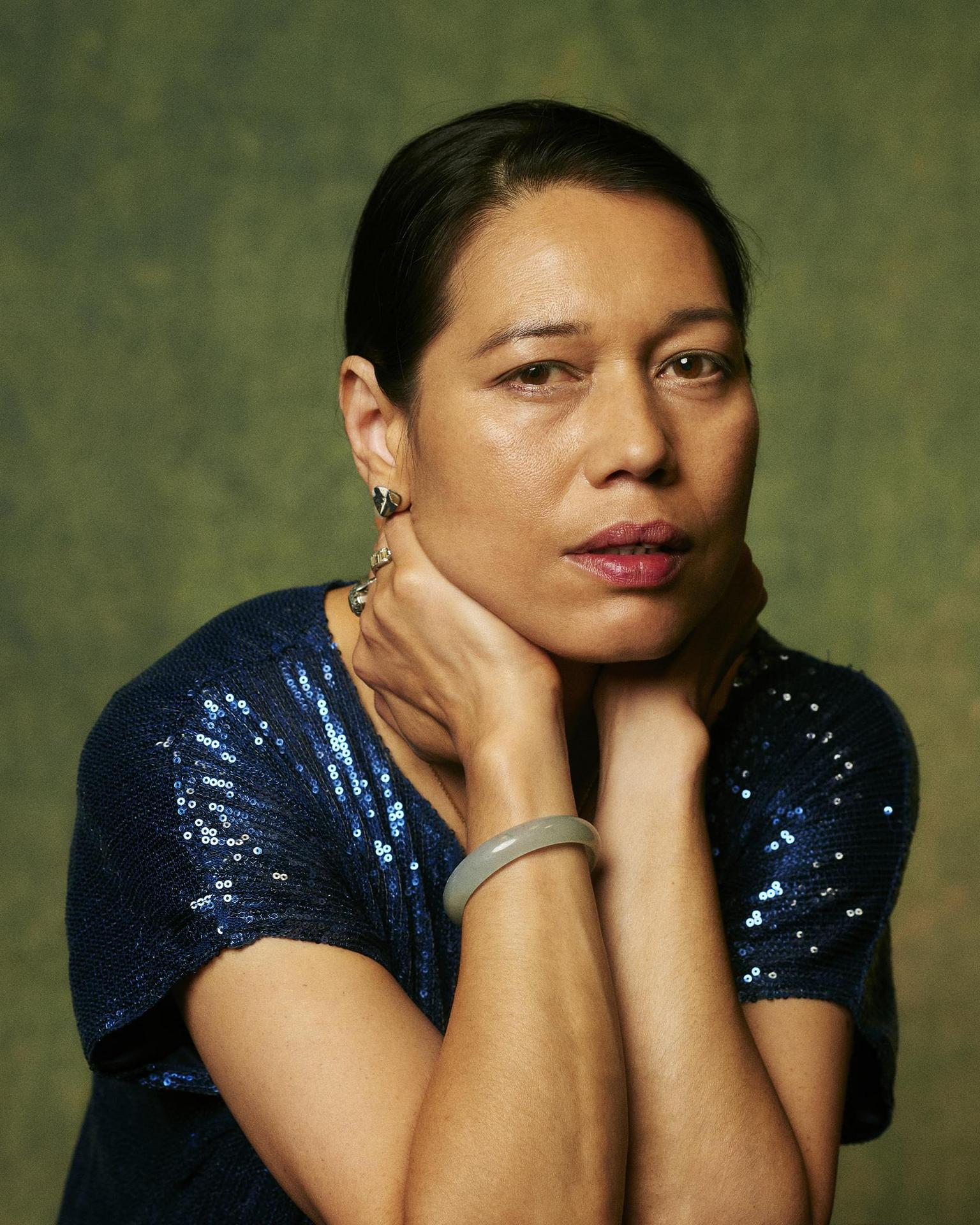
Francesca Beard for the Museum of Colour photographed by Derrick Kakembo 2022

Francesca Beard (born 1968) is a Malaysian writer and performance poet. Born in Kuala Lumpur, she has been based in London for much of her adult life and cites the city as a major inspiration in her work. She has represented contemporary British literature all over the world, from Azerbaijan to Bulgaria to Colombia, in all sorts of venues, from a Moscow library to a Melbourne jazz club.

She has a one-woman show, Chinese Whispers, produced by Apples and Snakes, Britain's foremost performance poetry organisation, directed by Arlette Kim George, with lighting by Flick Ansell, costumes by Hardy Bleckman of Maharishi and original visuals by Jason Larkin. Long-time collaborator Piers Faccini composed the music for the show. Faccini and Beard were co-founders of musical collective "Charley Marlowe", which disbanded in 2002. Faccini went on to release the successful album Leave No Trace, on LaBel Bleu, and is working on a second album.

Francesca Beard runs regular workshops and masterclasses in schools and organisations in Britain and abroad. She has been writer-in-residence for the Tower of London, Hampton Court Palace and the Metropolitan Police, and run workshops for many institutions, including the British Library, the National Theatre and the Natural History Museum. In May 2005, her first radio play, The Healing Pool, was broadcast on BBC Radio 4 and London Live.

As a playwright, her work was showcased in Pentabus Theatre's production of Open White Spaces at the 2006 Edinburgh Fringe Festival. She has had a short play on at the Royal Court Theatre and was one of the fifty "most promising new writers in Britain" currently on attachment to the Royal Court and the BBC. She developed a new project, working title, London Tales, with B3 Media, supported by Arts Council England.

In 2018, she is touring her new one-woman show How to Survive a Post-Truth Apocalypse around the UK. It was developed from the show A Lie, a collaboration between Francesca Beard and Hannah Jane Walker, and with support from Apples and Snakes, Improbable theatre, Cambridge Junction and Roundhouse. The tour was supported by Arts Council England.

She is the mother of two girls.
