= Kulanjan =

Studio album by Taj Mahal & Toumani Diabaté
- Released: August 1999
- Recorded: April 1999
- Studios: John Keane Studios, Athens, Georgia
- Genres: Blues, world music
- Label: Hannibal
- Producers: Joe Boyd, Lucy Durán

Taj Mahal chronology
Blue Light Boogie (1998)	Kulanjan (1999)	The Best of Taj Mahal (2000)

Toumani Diabaté chronology
New Ancient Strings (1999)	Kulanjan (1999)	Jarabi: The Best of Toumani Diabaté (2001)

Kulanjan is a 1999 album by blues artist Taj Mahal and Malian kora-player Toumani Diabaté.

Mahal had first visited Mali in 1979, and the title of the album comes from the track "Kulanjan" from the 1970 album of kora music, Ancient Strings, by Toumani Diabaté's father Sidiki Diabaté. Mahal and Toumani Diabaté had first met in 1990, and in 1999, Toumani Diabeté selected six virtuoso Malian musicians and took them to record the album with Mahal in Athens, Georgia.

The album was described by New Statesman as "a rousing set of eclectic grooves, calling on ragtime, barrelhouse blues and even rock'n'roll".

Kulanjan was named album of the year by Folk Roots magazine, and President Barack Obama recommended the album in a survey for the Borders book chain.

Taj Mahal followed the album with a tour accompanied by West African musicians, linking his American blues sound to traditional West African rhythms and tracing the origins of blues to West Africa, Mahal is also convinced that Mali's Mande griot (musician) clan were his ancestors.

Professional ratings
Review scores
Source	Rating
AllMusic	4/5 stars
Robert Christgau	A−
The Hindu	(very favorable)
The Penguin Guide to Blues Recordings	3/4 stars
Rolling Stone	4/5 stars

== Track listing ==
1. "Queen Bee" (Mahal)
2. "Tunkaranke (The Adventurer)" (Mahal, Diabaté)
3. "Ol' Georgie Buck" (Mahal)
4. "Kulanjan (The Long-Crested Hawk-Eagle)" (Diabaté)
5. "Fanta" (Mahal, Diabaté)
6. "Guede Man Na (Guede Was Here)" (Diabaté)
7. "Catfish Blues" (Mahal)
8. "K'an Ben (Let's Get Together)" (Diabaté)
9. "Take This Hammer" (Mahal)
10. "Atlanta Kaira" (Diabaté)
11. "Mississippi-Mali Blues" (Diabaté)
12. "Sahara" (Mahal)
