= Piers Faccini =

English singer (born 1970)

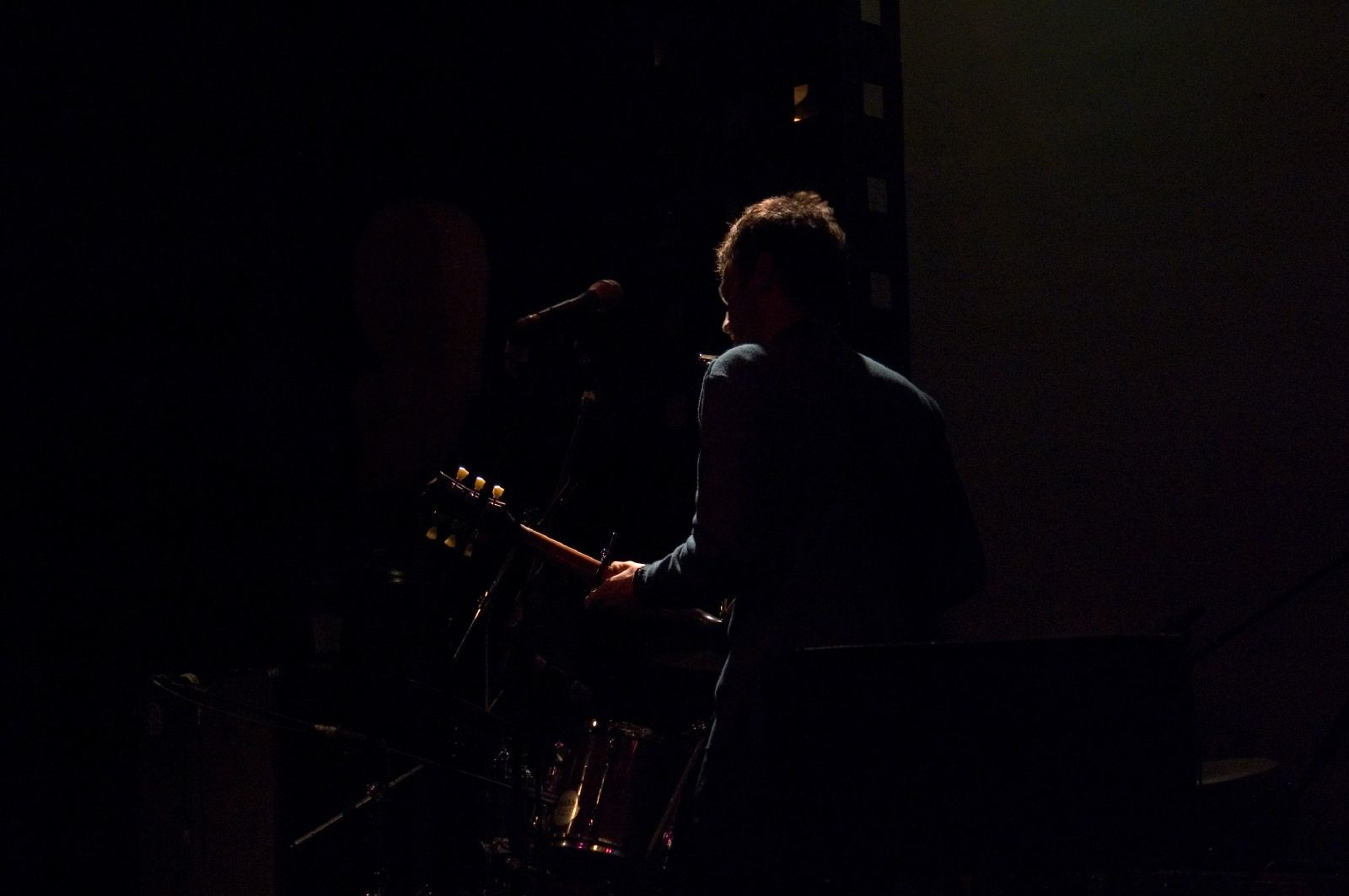
- Faccini performing in 2006

Background information
- Born: 28 April 1970 (age 55–56)
- Origin: London, England
- Genres: World music, Folk music
- Occupations: Singer, songwriter
- Years active: 1996–present
- Labels: Beating Drum, Bleu Electric, Everloving Records, Tôt ou tard, Six Degrees Records

Piers Damian G. Faccini (born 1970) is an English singer, painter, and songwriter.

== Biography ==
Piers Faccini was born in London, England, to an Italian father and an English mother. His family moved to France when he was five years old. His brother is the writer Ben Faccini.

Faccini first appeared on the music scene in London in 1997, co-founding Charley Marlowe with performance poet Francesca Beard, percussionist Frank Byng and guitarist Luc Suarez; the band split in 2001 when Faccini decided to pursue a solo career. His first solo album, Leave no Trace, was released in 2004 by French Independent label Label Bleu. His second album, Tearing Sky, was released by Los Angeles label Everloving Records in 2006; it was produced by JP Plunier, and featured Ben Harper, who Faccini toured with between 2006 and 2008. His third album was released by the French independent record label Tot ou Tard in 2009 and was co-produced by Faccini and Renaud Letang. His fourth album, My Wilderness, was released in late 2011 on Six Degrees Records in the United States and on Tot ou Tard in Europe. His fifth album, Between Dogs and Wolves (2013), and sixth album, I Dreamed an Island (2016), were released on his own label Beating Drum.

Faccini has collaborated over the years with many musicians and singers including Rokia Traore, Busi Mhlongo, Ben Harper, Ballake Sissoko, Vincent Segal, Camille, Francesca Beard, Patrick Watson, Dawn Landes and Ibrahim Maalouf, amongst others. In March 2011, he contributed to the Patagonia Music Collective, contributing to the UK-based Environmental Justice Foundation.

Faccini has also produced several albums for other artists, most notably Ela by Brazilian cellist and singer Dom La Nena, Northern Folk by Jenny Lysander and Terre de Mon Poeme by Yelli Yelli. Faccini is also a poet and children's author, publishing his first book of poetry, No One's Here, in 2016, and a children's book/cd, La Plus Belle des Berceuses, in 2017, which he also illustrated and was published by the French publisher Actes Sud.

In 2009, his album Two Grains Of Sand was nominated for the French independent music award Le Prix Constantin and was voted album of the year by the listeners of French national radio France Inter. His album with the cellist Vincent Segal, Songs of Time Lost, was in NPR's top ten world music albums of 2014; it was also included in Songlines' top 10 albums of 2014 as well as in their Greatest World Music Albums of the last five years list.

His seventh studio album, Shapes Of The Fall, was released on 2 April 2021. The 13 tracks were co-produced by Piers Faccini and Fred Soulard.

In February 2025 he released Our Calling, a collaboration with Malian musician Ballaké Sissoko.

== Discography ==
Title	Year	Peak chart positions	
Title	Year	BEL Heat	FRA
This Could Be You (with Charley Marlowe)	2000	—	—
Leave No Trace	2004	—	—
The Streets of London EP	2005	—	—
Tearing Sky	2006	—	86
Two Grains of Sand	2009	—	82
My Wilderness	2011	1	47
Between Dogs and Wolves	2013	—	112
Songs of Time Lost	2014	—	126
Desert Songs EP (with Dawn Landes)	2016	—	—
I Dreamed an Island	2016	—	129
Shapes Of The Fall	2021	—	—
Our Calling (with Ballaké Sissoko)	2025		
