= 3MA =

African music group

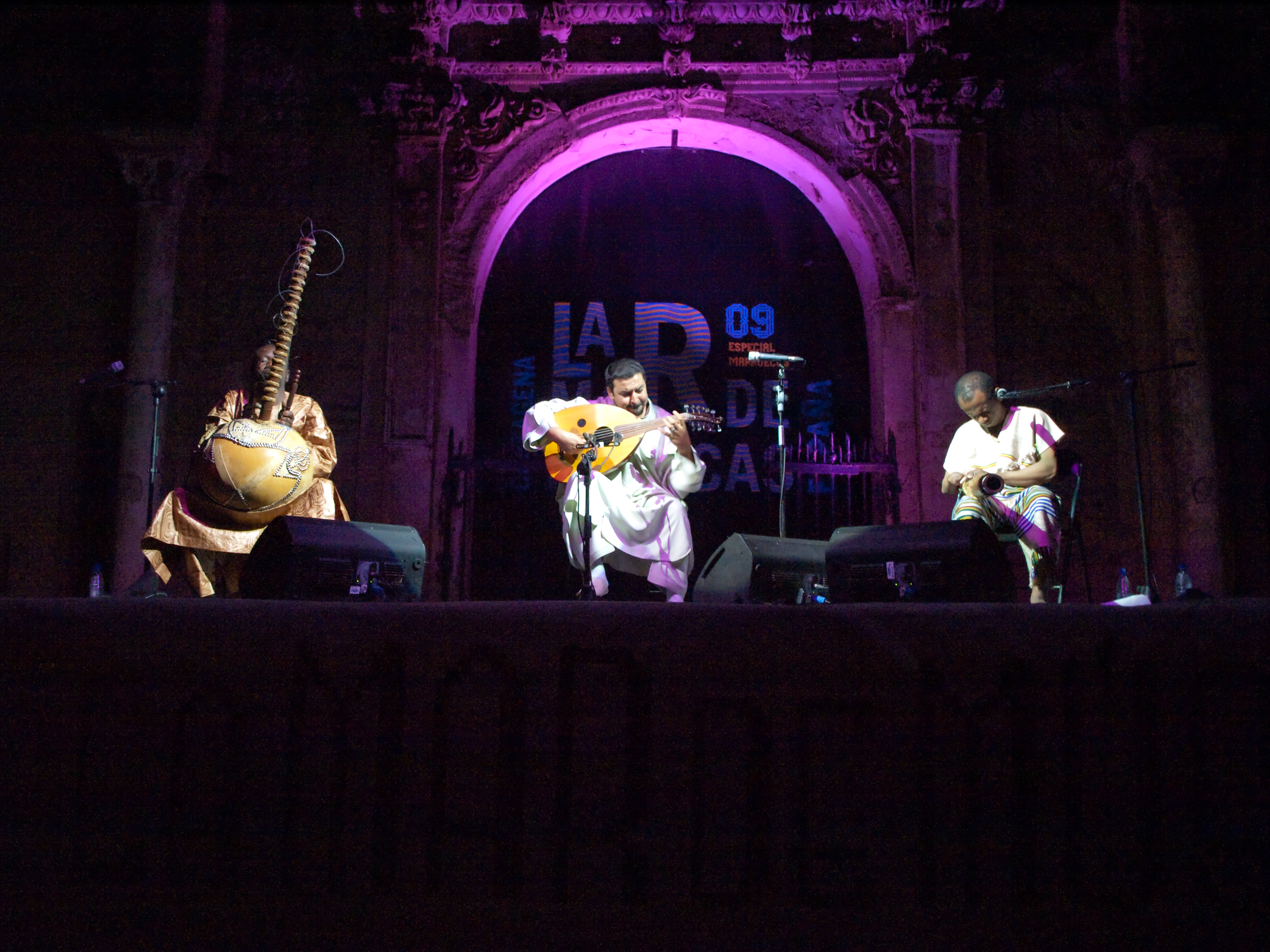
- 3MA performing in Cartagena, Spain

Background information
- Origin: Mali, Morocco, Madagascar
- Genre: African popular music
- Instruments: kora, oud, valiha
- Years active: 2008-present
- Labels: Contrejour Records, Six Degrees Records
- Members: Ballaké Sissoko, Driss El Maloumi, Rajery
- Website: Six Degrees Records - 3 MA

3MA is a contemporary African music group, consisting of three players of different string instruments: Ballaké Sissoko from Mali on kora, Driss El Maloumi from Morocco on oud and Rajery from Madagascar on valiha. The band takes its name from the first two letters of each member's country of origin in French: Madagascar, Mali, and Maroc.

== Artistic career ==
The idea for an innovative African group of exclusively string instruments, with no percussion or rhythm section, was born during a first meeting in 2006 in Agadir, between Moroccan oud player and composer Driss El Maloumi and Rajery, a Madagascan musician using an 18-stringed tubular zither called valiha. To add a third instrument with an even wider sound range, they imagined that their instruments would be well matched with a kora, the traditional Malian instrument with 21 strings and a large calabash as a resonator. A few months later, they met in Madagascar, and Ballaké Sissoko, a leading kora player, joined them for a series of workshops and concerts, sponsored by the local French Institute. In an interview with nonprofit media organization NPR, Sissoko said: "I created the chromatic kora with two and half octaves for this project, to dialogue better with other instruments."

In his positive review of the group's first album, entitled 3MA - Madagascar, Mali, Maroc, British music critic Charlie Gillett called their music "satisfyingly unclassifiable", and world music magazine Songlines, which included the album in its Top of the World selection, qualified the trio's style as "African Chamber Music".

Apart from their own albums, 3MA have also participated in the musical project called The Routes of Slavery. They were invited to join their compositions, relating to the history of the slave trade from Africa, by the artistic director of this recording for audio and video, Jordi Savall, with whom Driss El Maloumi has played the oud on numerous albums.

Anarouz is the trio's second album, published almost ten years after the first recording. Apart from the mainly instrumental pieces, it presents the musicians also singing in their respective languages (Bambara, Malgache and Arabic).

== Discography ==
- 3MA (2008), Transglobal World Music Charts in January 2008
- Anarouz (2017), Songlines Music Award 2019 (nominated)
- with Jordi Savall and other musicians: The Routes of Slavery, DVD and 2 CDs with booklet, (2016)
