= Myanmar Mixed Martial Arts =

- Trade name: 3MA
- Type: Private
- Industry: Mixed martial arts
- Founded: 2023 Sep 17
- Founders: Anton
- Area served: Myanmar
- Key people: Anton

Myanmar Mixed Martial Arts (popularly known as 3MA) is a mixed martial arts (MMA) promotion based in Myanmar.The organization stages MMA events, provides competitive opportunities for MMA fighters, and operates fighter development programs.3MA events feature fighters from different regions of Myanmar, as well as Myanmar fighters training abroad and international fighters competing in Myanmar. The promotion also distributes event-related content and live broadcasts through social media and online media platforms

== History ==
3MA was founded in 2023 by Anton to promote mixed martial arts in Myanmar. The organization holds regular fight events featuring various weight classes.3MA was established with the aim of developing mixed martial arts in Myanmar and providing a structured platform for local MMA fighters to compete. The promotion has featured fighters with backgrounds in mixed martial arts as well as traditional and combat sports, including Lethwei and Bando. Fighters from different ethnic and regional backgrounds have participated in its events.As its event series developed, 3MA expanded opportunities for both established fighters and emerging athletes. The organization also introduced development activities intended to provide inexperienced fighters with opportunities to gain competitive experience

== 3MA 10 ==
3MA10 was a 3MA MMA event held on 6 September 2026 in Yangon, Myanmar. The event featured MMA bouts across different weight classes. One of the featured bouts was a 60 kg matchup between Sar Law La and Gin Pu. Other fighters who participated in the event included Nay Htet Aung, Khant Si Thu, Khun Soe Moe Naing and Zan Zan Min Htet. The event produced results including technical knockouts, submissions and a no contest

== 3MA 11 ==
3MA11 was held on 4 October 2026 at 3MA Arena in Hlegu Township, Yangon Region, Myanmar. The event featured fighters from different parts of Myanmar, as well as fighters with international training or competition experience. The announced matchups included: • Toe Lone vs. Myat Min Thu • Kyar Lay vs. Min Khaung Kyaw Htun • Khun Soe Moe Naing vs. Wai Yan Shine • Toe Thet vs. Thway Htet Aung • Augustine Van vs. Wanna Kyaw • Min Myat Thu vs. Salai John Hmauk • Zaw Dula Mashi vs. Lar Gabouk Htoo • Win Zaw vs. Sa Htee Shue The bout between Mg Chay and Hein Si Thu Oo was removed from the card because of an injury sustained by Mg Chay. Before the event, 3MA conducted official weigh-ins and faceoffs. The event was also broadcast through 3MA’s online media platforms and partner media channels.

== 3MA HS ==
3MA HS (3MA Hard Sparring) is a fighter development program operated by 3MA. The program is intended to provide opportunities for developing fighters and athletes with limited competition experience to participate in training and sparring activities. Activities associated with 3MA HS include tryouts and hard sparring sessions. The program is intended to help identify developing fighters and provide them with experience that may prepare them for participation in professional MMA competitions

== Fighters ==
3MA events have featured fighters from different regions and ethnic backgrounds in Myanmar. Participants have included fighters from backgrounds associated with Chin, Kachin, Rakhine, Mon, Pa-O and other communities. Some fighters have also had previous experience in Lethwei, Bando and other traditional combat sports. Notable fighters who have participated in 3MA events include Augustine Van, Zaw Dula Mashi, Salai John Hmauk, Kyar Lay, Toe Lone and Toe Thet

== Pre-event activities ==
3MA promotes its events through a series of pre-event activities and media content.These activities include the publication of fight cards, fighter profiles, player messages, faceoffs, weigh-ins and countdown announcements. Following events, 3MA also publishes fight highlights, winner announcements and bout-related content through its social media platforms.

== Events ==
The following is a list of events held by 3MA:

Event	Date	Venue	Location
3MA 11	Oct 4 2026	3MA Arena	Yangon, Myanmar
3MA 10	Sep 6 2026	3MA Arena	Yangon, Myanmar
3MA 9	July 26 2026	3MA Arena	Yangon, Myanmar
3MA 8	Dec 7 2025	3MA Arena	Yangon, Myanmar
3MA 7	July 27 2025		Yangon, Myanmar
3MA 6	Dec 22 2024		Yangon, Myanmar
3MA 5	Oct 20 2024		Yangon, Myanmar
3MA 4	Aug 25 2024		Yangon, Myanmar
3MA 3	Jan 21 2024		Yangon, Myanmar
3MA 2	Nov 4 2023		Yangon, Myanmar

== Media and broadcasting ==
3MA distributes information about its events through social media and online media platforms. Depending on the event, live broadcasts have been made available through 3MA’s Facebook and YouTube channels, as well as the Facebook, YouTube and television platforms of media partners. In addition to live broadcasts, 3MA publishes promotional and informational content including fighter profiles, matchup announcements, fight cards, highlights and event results

== Fighter development ==
One of the objectives of 3MA’s fighter development activities is to provide opportunities for emerging athletes to gain experience in mixed martial arts. Programs such as 3MA HS allow developing fighters to participate in organized sparring and tryout activities and to gain experience in a competitive environment. The development program is intended to identify potential fighters and prepare them for future participation in 3MA professional competitions

== Objectives ==
3MA’s activities focus on the development of mixed martial arts in Myanmar and the creation of competitive opportunities for local fighters. The organization also aims to provide opportunities for emerging fighters and young athletes to develop their skills and gain experience in MMA competition.

== See also ==
- Mixed martial arts
- Lethwei
- Bando
