= Banning Eyre =

Guitarist, writer, and photographer

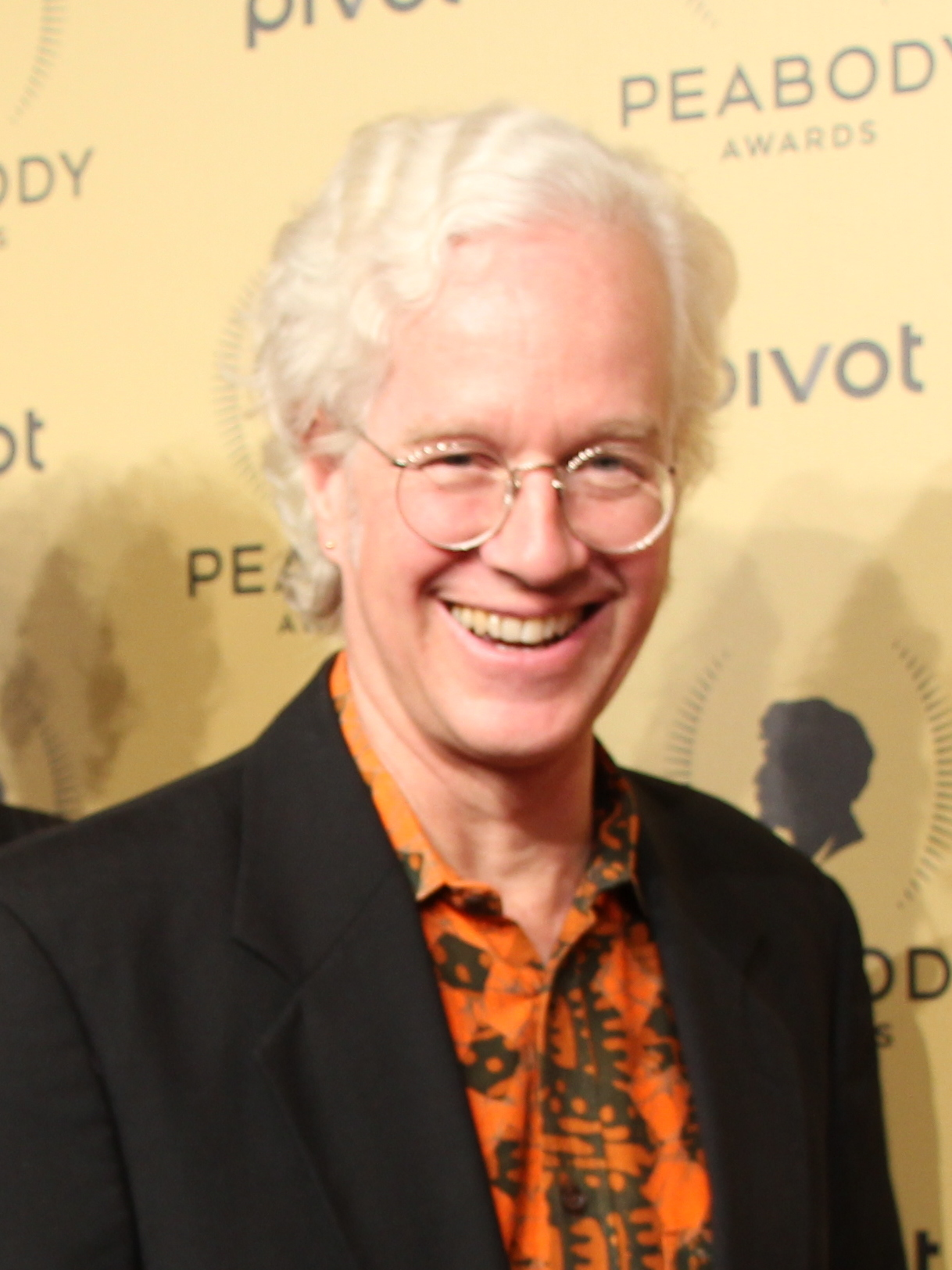
Banning Eyre

Banning Eyre is an American guitarist, musicologist, writer, photographer, and producer specializing in the music of Africa. He has produced the Peabody Award-winning radio show Afropop Worldwide and is author of several books on African music including AFROPOP! An Illustrated Guide to Contemporary African Music (with Sean Barlow), In Griot Time, An American Guitarist in Mali, Lion Songs: Thomas Mapfumo and the Music That Made Zimbabwe, the instructional guide Guitar Atlas: Africa, and a report on censorship in Zimbabwe for the Danish human rights organization Freemuse entitled Playing With Fire, Fear and Self-Censorship in Zimbabwean Music.

He also contributed to the Cambridge Companion series volume on the guitar.

Eyre lives in Brooklyn, New York.
