= Ballaké Sissoko =

Malian player of the kora (born 1968)

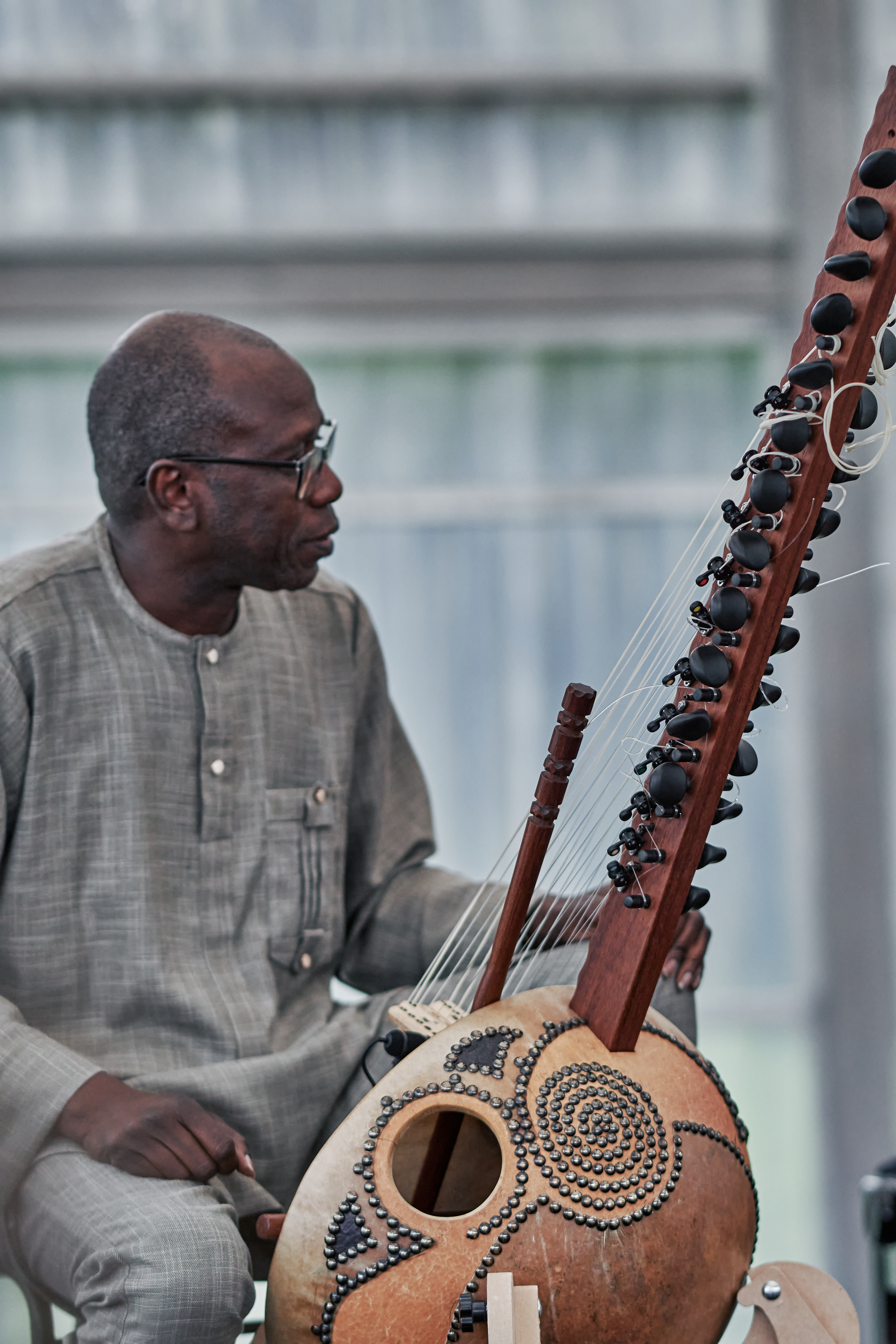
- Sissoko in 2023

Background information
- Born: 1968 (age 57–58)
- Origin: Mali
- Genres: World
- Instrument: Kora
- Labels: Indigo Records, Six Degrees Records
- Formerly of: Mande Tabolo

Ballaké Sissoko (born 1968) is a Malian player of the kora. He has worked with Toumani Diabaté and Taj Mahal, and is a member of the group 3MA with Driss El Maloumi and Rajery.

== Biography ==
Ballaké's father, Djelimady Sissoko, was a notable musician from the Gambia in his own right who moved to Mali and was funded by the government to be part of the national orchestra. Sissoko started playing music at a young age, as most born into the jeli or griot caste do. In 1981, when he was 13, Sissoko's father died, and he took his father's place within the Ensemble Instrumental National du Mali. He also performed with several prominent female singers before coming to fame through his duet with Toumani Diabaté in 1999. In 2000, he formed the trio Mande Tabolo with a ngoni player and a balafon player.

His 2005 album, Tomora, features Toumani Diabaté on kora, singers Alboulkadri Barry and Rokia Traoré and Fanga Diawara, violin soloist of the Mali National Instrumental Ensemble.

His record Chamber Music released in October 2009 was the result of a collaboration with Vincent Ségal, a classical cellist known for his work with Bumcello, and was released by French label No Format! and the U.S. label Six Degrees Records.

He released a solo album, At Peace, in 2013. Cellist Vincent Ségal produced the album and plays on several tracks.

In 2023, Sissoko premiered a Concerto for Kora by the Lebanese composer Zad Moultaka at the Radio France concert hall in Paris.

Since 2022, Sissoko has collaborated in duo concerts with South African guitarist Derek Gripper, who has transcribed kora music for performance on the classical guitar. In 2024, the duo released the album Ballaké Sissoko & Derek Gripper on Matsuli Music.

== The broken kora affair ==
On returning from a 2020 US tour, Sissoko checked in his €5000 custom-made kora at the airport in New York for the flight back to Paris. On his arrival he discovered that the instrument had been dismantled by U.S. Customs and Border Protection agency. According to Sissoko's manager, Corinne Serres: "Even if all the components that had been dismantled remained intact, it would take weeks for a kora of this calibre to return to its former state of resonance." The customs agency, however, denied opening the kora case, which should not have triggered an alarm in the security scanners.

Sissoko's 2021 album Djourou, also released by No Format, takes its name from these events.

== Discography ==
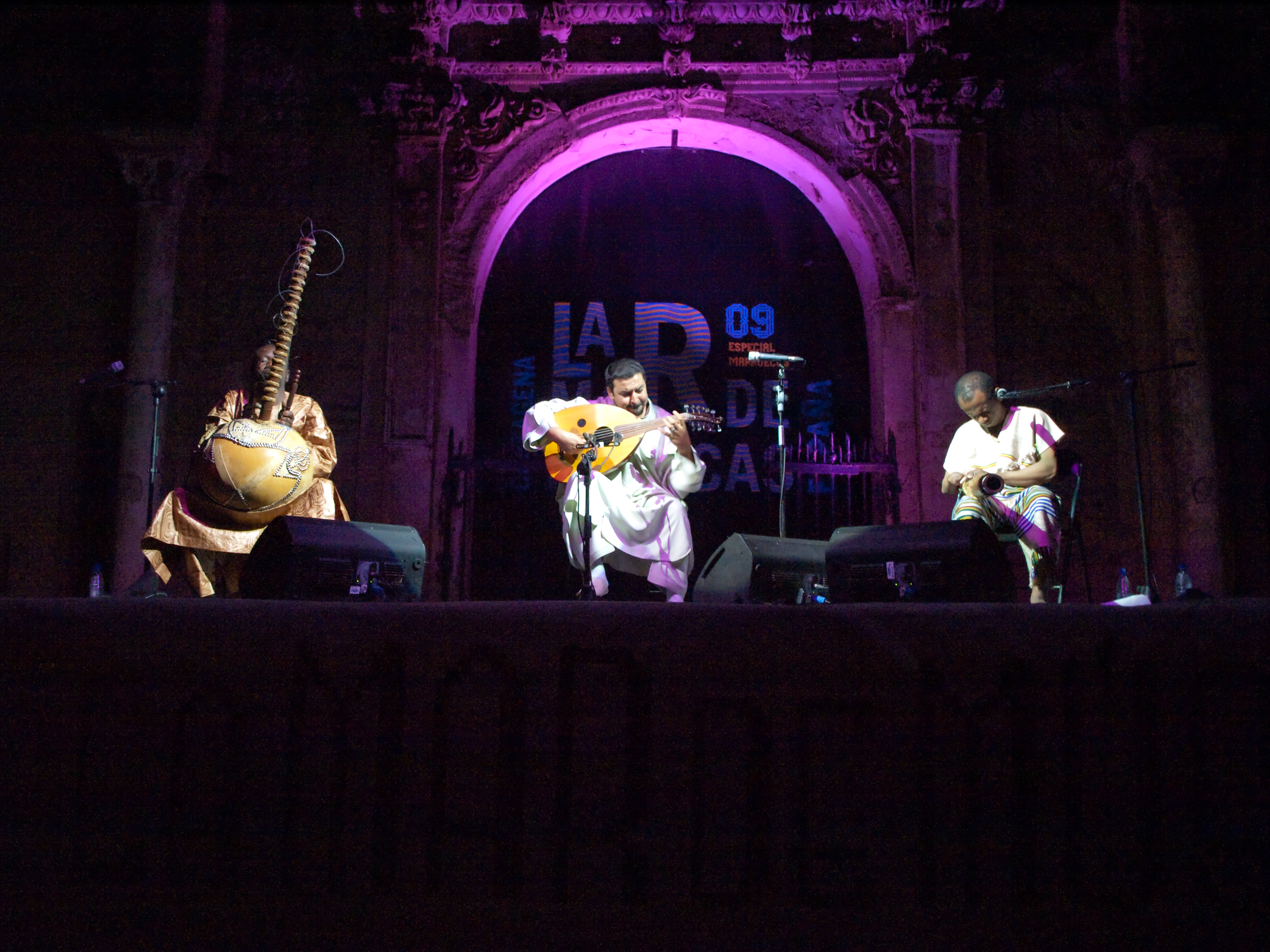
Sissoko (left) performing with 3MA, Cartagena, Spain in 2009

- 1998 - Kora Music from Mali Kora-Solo album (bibiafrica records)
- 1999 - New Ancient Strings, with Toumani Diabaté (Hannibal-Ryko)
- 2000 - Déli (Label Bleu/Indigo)
- 2003 - Diario Mali (Label Ponderosa), with Ludovico Einaudi
- 2005 - Tomora (Label Bleu/Indigo)
- 2009 - Chamber Music (No Format!/Six Degrees), with Vincent Segal
- 2011 - Humbling Tides (Talitres Records / No Format!), with Stranded Horse
- 2013 - At Peace
- 2015 - Musique de Nuit, with Vincent Segal
- 2017 - Anarouz, with Driss al Maloumy (oud) and Rajery (valiha), featuring string instruments from Mali, Morocco, and Madagascar
- 2019 - Sissoko & Sissoko, with Baba Sissoko on ngonis, tama, and vocals
- 2021 - Djourou
- 2021 - A Touma
- 2023 - Les Égarés, with Vincent Segal (cello), Emile Parisien (saxophone) & Vincent Peirani (accordion)
- 2024 - Ballaké Sissoko and Derek Gripper
- 2024 - Bamako*Chicago Sound System, with Nicole Mitchell
- 2025 - Our Calling, with Piers Faccini
