= Carisma de Alquiler =

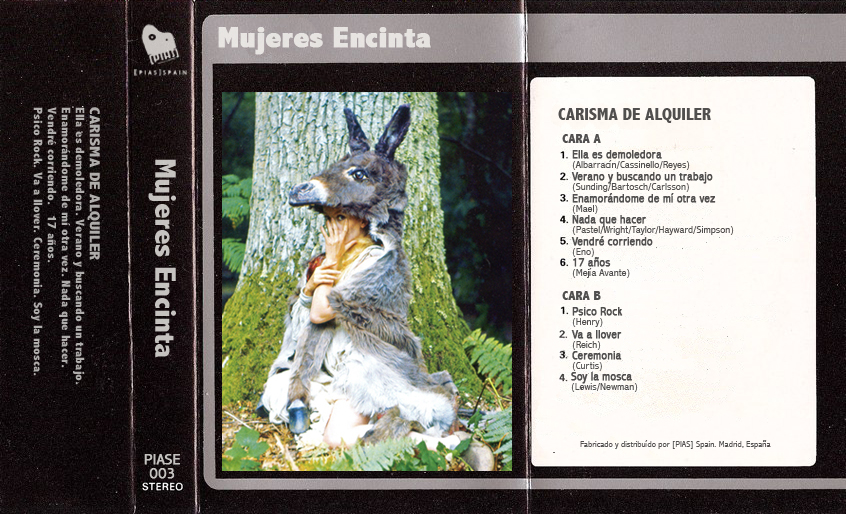

Compilation album by Mujeres Encinta
- Released: 2001
- Genre: Covers; Compilation
- Length: 47:02
- Label: [PIAS] Spain

Mujeres Encinta chronology
It Was Delicious Losing You (2000)	Carisma de Alquiler (2001)	We have won! Haven't we? (2002)

Carisma de Alquiler is a covers compilation by concept band Mujeres Encinta. It was released on a limited edition cassette only in Spain in 2001 by [PIAS] Spain. The cassette contained Spanish versions from a wide range of songs by Sparks, Eggstone, Brian Eno, Steve Reich, Pierre Henry and a couple of Spanish bands.

== Track listing ==
1. "Ella Es Demoledora" (Farmacia de Guardia) – 2:02
2. "Verano Y Buscando Un Trabajo" (Eggstone) – 3:40
3. "Enamorándome De Mí Otra Vez" (Sparks) – 3:10
4. "Nada Que Hacer" (The Pastels) – 3:45
5. "Vendré Corriendo" (Brian Eno) -4:02
6. "17 años" (Los Ángeles Azules) 3:00
7. "Psico Rock" (Pierre Henry) - 2:50
8. "Va A Llover" (Steve Reich) – 9:50
9. "Ceremonia" (Joy Division / New Order ) – 4:10
10. "Soy La Mosca" (Wire) – 3:15
- Spanish versions of all songs by Mujeres Encinta
