= Daniela Franco =

Mexican conceptual artist and writer

daniela franco
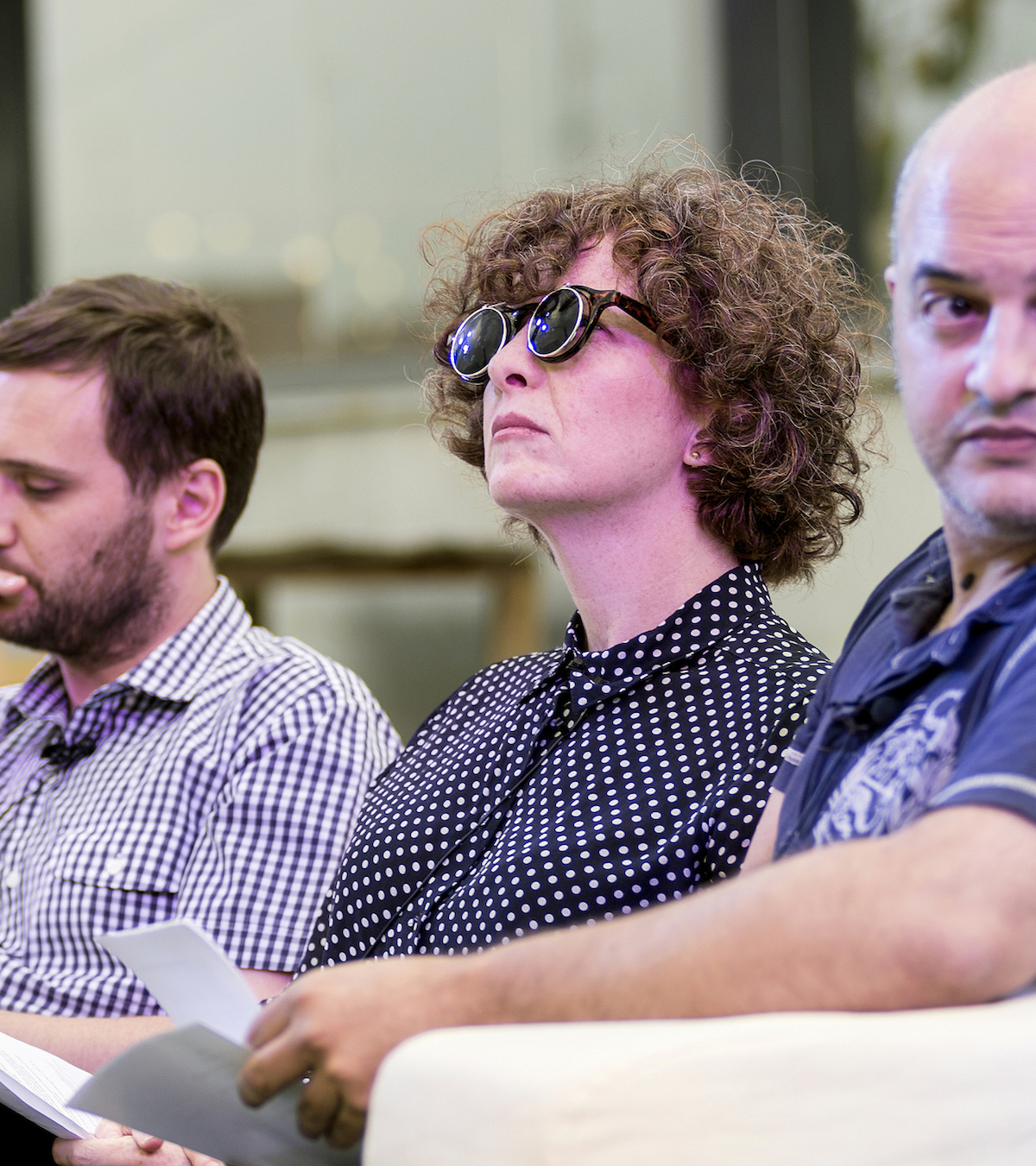
- daniela franco at the Centro de Arte 2 de Mayo in Madrid, 2014.
- Born: 1974; Guanajuato, Mexico
- Education: San Francisco Art Institute, École nationale supérieure des Beaux-Arts
- Known for: Conceptual art, multimedia art, narrative art
- Awards: Fulbright Scholar, Member of SNCA
- Website: danielafranco.com

Daniela Franco (whose artistic name is stylized in lower caps: daniela franco) is a French-Mexican conceptual artist and writer of Syrian origin who lives and works in Paris. Her body of work is interdisciplinary and explores intersections between experimental writing, pop music and visual art through the creation of archives, temporary fictions and video. She is a San Francisco Art Institute and École nationale supérieure des Beaux-Arts alumna as well as a Fulbright scholar. Her projects have received support and grants from the Rockefeller Foundation, the Mexican National Council for Culture and Arts and Colección Júmex.

== Projects ==
franco's first projects were done in video, using images and sounds from a poetical construction stand, for their form, euphony and rhythm. In On n’attend que toi (2003), she illustrated Harry Mathews's poem Jack's Reminders to the King of Karactika with a series of travel images and Ian Monk's voice in off. daniela franco's work is often based on sets of self-imposed constraints much like the French literary group Oulipo whose members have often collaborated in franco's projects.

Her latest work has been done in the form of interdisciplinary and collaborative projects of fiction and archiving that also question the role of authorship. In 2010 she created face B, an on-line archive for the contemporary art museum La Maison Rouge in Paris. Face B archives LP covers selected by music critic Alex Ross, magazines like The Wire, Vice, Les Inrockuptibles, and McSweeney's, fashion designer agnès b., UbuWeb, the music label Alga Marghen, Oren Ambarchi, Clive Graham, the Oulipo, Philip Andelman for Colette, etc.

Sandys at Waikiki is an artist book published in 2009 by Editorial RM. It is the result of the fictional search for the Sandys, a family that lived in California in the 1940s and 1950s. Having found the Sandys' slides at a flea market, daniela franco reconstructed their lives, inviting others to offer clues in the form of poems, letters and even an eyewitness testimony. Sandys at Waikiki includes texts by Enrique Vila-Matas, Sean Condon, André Alexis, Emmanuel Adely, Juan Villoro, Fabio Morábito, Marius Serra, and members of the Oulipo like Jacques Jouet, and Marcel Bénabou among other writers.

daniela franco writes about music and art for websites and magazines like Letras Libres or La Tempestad. She has translated Roy Spivey by Miranda July and Referential by Lorrie Moore (both originally published by The New Yorker) for the magazine Letras Libres. She has also interviewed and translated poet Kenneth Goldsmith.

daniela franco is represented by Saenger in Mexico City.
