= Rajery =

Musician

- Also known as: Rajery
- Born: Germain Randrianrisoa
- Occupation: Musician
- Instrument: Valiha

Rajery, born Germain Randrianrisoa, is a player of the valiha from Madagascar who founded the modern valiha orchestra. As an infant, he lost all the fingers on one of his hands; subsequently, he became a self-taught valiha player.

== Biography ==
Rajery was born in 1965 in the northern part of Madagascar. As a teenager, he was teased by his peers for his interest in playing the valiha, an instrument that usually requires extensive use of both hands. However, due to his handicap, he developed a unique musical technique and style. At this time, there was no method of obtaining formal instruction in playing the valiha. Rajery worked to solve this problem through his authorship of the book The Secret of the Valiha, which also included a system of musical notation. Since 2006, Rajery has been a member of the musical trio 3MA, with which he tours and records.

== Discography ==
- Dorotanety (Indigo, Label Bleu, 1999)
- Fanamby (Indigo, Label Bleu, 2001)
- Anarouz (Six Degrees Records, 2017, as a member of 3MA)
