= List of acronyms: J =

This list contains acronyms, initialisms, and pseudo-blends that begin with the letter J.

For the purposes of this list:

- acronym = an abbreviation pronounced as if it were a word, e.g., SARS = severe acute respiratory syndrome, pronounced to rhyme with cars
- initialism = an abbreviation pronounced wholly or partly using the names of its constituent letters, e.g., CD = compact disc, pronounced cee dee
- pseudo-blend = an abbreviation whose extra or omitted letters mean that it cannot stand as a true acronym, initialism, or portmanteau (a word formed by combining two or more words).

(a) = acronym, e.g.: SARS – (a) severe acute respiratory syndrome
(i) = initialism, e.g.: CD – (i) compact disc
(p) = pseudo-blend, e.g.: UNIFEM – (p) United Nations Development Fund for Women
(s) = symbol (none of the above, representing and pronounced as something else; for example: MHz – megahertz)

Some terms are spoken as either acronym or initialism, e.g., VoIP, pronounced both as voyp and V-O-I-P.

(Main list of acronyms)

- J – (s) Joule

== J0–9 ==
- J1 – (s) Joint [Manpower &] Personnel Directorate
- J2 – (s) Joint Intelligence Directorate
- J2EE – (i) Java 2 Platform, Enterprise Edition
- J2ME – (i) Java 2 Platform, Micro Edition
- J2SE – (i) Java 2 Platform, Standard Edition
- J3 – (s) Joint Operations Directorate
- J4 – (s) Joint Logistics Directorate
- J5 – (s) Joint Strategic Plans & Policy Directorate
- J6 – (s) Joint Information Technology Directorate (Command, Control, Communications & Computer Systems)
- J7 – (s) Joint Operational Plans & Interoperability Directorate
- J8 – (s) Joint Force Structure, Resources, & Assessment Directorate
- J9 – (s) Joint Public Affairs Directorate (Civilian-Military Cooperation)

== JA ==
- ja – (s) Japanese language (ISO 639-1 code)
- JA – (s) Japan (FIPS 10-4 country code)
- Jabodetabek – (p) Jakarta, Bogor, Depok, Tangerang, Bekasi (urban agglomeration of Jakarta)
- JAFT – (s) Just A Field Test
- JAG – (a) Judge Advocate General Corps (military law)
- JAL – (p) Japan Airlines
- JALLC – (a) Joint Analysis and Lessons Learned Centre (NATO)
- JAM – (s) Jamaica (ISO 3166 trigram)
- JAMA – (i) Journal of the American Medical Association
- JAOA- (i) Journal of the American Osteopathic Association
- JANET
  - (p) Joint Academic Network
  - (a) Just Another Non-Existent Terminal or Joint Air Network for Employee Transportation or Janet Airlines, a highly classified air shuttle service for the USAF, serving Area 51 and the Tonopah Test Range
- JANUS
  - (a) Joint Academic Network Using Satellites (UK)
  - Joint Army Navy Uniform Simulation
  - (p) Joint Army-Navy Staff
  - Just ANother Useless Simulation (Note: The U.S. Army Janus simulation is not an acronym)
- JAS
  - (i) Japan Air System, defunct Japanese airline
  - Japanese Agricultural Standard
  - Jericho Appreciation Society, former professional wrestling stable
  - Journal of Applied Statistics
- JATO – (a) Jet-Assisted Take-Off
- jav – (s) Javanese language (ISO 639-2 code)

== JB ==
- JB – (i) Junior Branch
- JB – (i) Jail Bait
- JBFSA – (i) Joint Blue Force Situational Awareness
- JB- Justin Bieber

== JC ==
- JCATS – (a) Joint Conflict And Tactical Simulation ("djay-catts")
- JCDB – (i) Joint Common Data Base
- JCDS – (i) Joint Chiefs of the Defence Staff
- JCIDS – (i) Joint Capabilities Integration and Development System
- JCIET – (i) Joint Combat Identification Evaluation Team
- JCL – (i) Job Control Language
- JCMOTF – (a) Joint Civil-Military Operations Task Force
- JCP – (a) Java Community Process
- JCS – (i) Joint Chiefs of Staff
- JCW – (i) Juggalo Championship Wrestling

== JD ==
- JD
  - (i) Jack Daniel's (whiskey)
  - Julian day
  - Juris Doctor (Latin, "doctor of jurisprudence")
- JDAM – (a/i) Joint Direct Attack Munition ("djay-dam")
- JDBC – (i) Java Data Base Connectivity
- JDCC – (i) UK Joint Doctrine and Concepts Centre, now the Development, Concepts and Doctrine Centre (DCDC)
- JDEM – (i) Joint Dark Energy Mission
- JDK – (i) Java Development Kit
- JDL – (i) Jewish Defense League
- JDM
  - (i) Japanese domestic market, referring specifically to automobiles and parts
  - Java Data Mining
  - Joint design manufacturing

== JE ==
- JE – (s) Jersey (FIPS 10-4 territory code)
- JEB
  - (a) James Ewell Brown (Stuart)
  - John Ellis Bush
- JEDP – (i) Jahwist, Elohist, Deuteronomist, Priestly (according to the documentary hypothesis, the sources of the Torah)
- JEE – (i) Java Platform, Enterprise Edition
- JEFX – (p) Joint Expeditionary Force eXperiment
- JEPD
  - (i) Jahwist, Elohist, Priestly, Deuteronomist
  - Jointly Exhaustive, Pairwise Disjoint
- JET – (a) Joint European Torus
- JEZ – (a) Joint Engagement Zone

== JF ==
- JFACC – (i) Joint Force Air Component Commander
- JFACTSU – (a) U.K. Joint Forward Air Controller Training and Standards Unit
- JFC – (i) Joint Force Commander
- JFCOM – (p) U.S. Joint Forces Command ("jiff-comm")
- JFET – (i/a) Junction Field-Effect Transistor ("jay-fett")
- JFHQ-NCR – (i) Joint Force Headquarters National Capital Region
- JFK – (i) John Fitzgerald Kennedy or the airport named after him.
- JFLCC – (i) Joint Force Land Component Commander
- JFMCC – (i) Joint Force Maritime Component Commander
- JFO – (i) Journal of Field Ornithology
- JFSOCC – (i) Joint Force Special Operations Component Commander
- JFTX – (i) Joint Field Training Exercise
- JFF- Jamaica Football Federation

== JH ==
- JH – (i) Japan Highway Public Corporation
- JH – (s) Jharkhand (Indian state code)

== JI ==
- JI – (i) Joint Implementation
- JIB – (a) Joint Information Bureau
- JIC – (a) Joint Intelligence Centre
- JINI – (a) Java Intelligent Network Infrastructure
- JITC – (i) Joint Interoperability Test Command
- JIVE – (a) Joint Institute for VLBI (Very Long Baseline Interferometry) in Europe

== JJ ==
- JJAP – (i) Japanese Journal of Applied Physics

== JK ==
- JK – (i) Jedi Knight – Just Kidding – (s) Spanair (IATA airline designator) – Jammu & Kashmir (Indian state code)

== JL ==
- JL – (s) Japan Airlines (IATA airline designator)
- JLA – (i) Justice League of America

== JM ==
- JM – (s) Jamaica (FIPS 10-4 country code; ISO 3166 digram)
- JMD – (s) Jamaican dollar (ISO 4217 currency code)
- JMS – (i) Java Message Service

== JN ==
- JN – (s) Jan Mayen Island (FIPS 10-4 territory code)
- JNI – (i) Java Native Interface
- JNLP – (i) Java Network Launch Protocol

== JO ==
- JO – (s) Jordan (FIPS 10-4 country code; ISO 3166 digram)
- JOA – (a/i) Joint Operations Area
- JOD – (s) Jordanian dinar (ISO 4217 currency code)
- Jofa – (p) Jonssons fabriker (Swedish, "Jonsson's Factories")
- JOPES – (a) Joint Operations Planning and Execution System
- JOR – (s) Jordan (ISO 3166 trigram)
- JOTS – (a) Joint Operations Tactical System
- JSP – (a) Joint Services Publication

== JP ==
- JP – (s) Japan (ISO 3166 digram) – (i) Justice of the Peace
- JPEG – (a) Joint Photographic Experts Group ("jay-peg")
- JPL – (i) Jet Propulsion Laboratory
- jpn – (s) Japanese language (ISO 639-2 code)
- JPN – (s) Japan (ISO 3166 trigram)
- JPY – (s) Japanese yen (ISO 4217 currency code)

== JQ ==
- JQ – (s) Jetstar (IATA airline designator) – (i) Johnny Quick – (s) Johnston Atoll (FIPS 10-4 territory code) – (i) Jonny Quest – Joshua Quagmire

== JR ==
- JRA – (i) Japanese Red Army – Joint Rear Area
- JRDF – (i) Joint Rapid Deployment Forces
- JRE – (i) Java Runtime Environment
- JREF – (i) James Randi Educational Foundation
- JROC – (i) Joint Requirements Oversight Council
- JROCM – (i) JROC Memorandum
- JRRF – (i) Joint Rapid Reaction Force
- JRSAI – Journal of the Royal Society of Antiquaries of Ireland

== JS ==
- JSAB − (a) Just Shapes & Beats ("djus-sab")
- JSAF – (a) Joint Semi-Automated Forces ("jay-saff")
- JSAP – (i) Japan Society of Applied Physics
- JSCSC – (i) Joint Services Command and Staff College
- JSD – (i) juris scientiae doctor (Latin, "doctor of science of law")
- JSDF – (i) Japan Self-Defense Forces
- JSEAD – (i) Joint Suppression of Enemy Air Defence (see SEAD)
- JSF – (i) Joint Strike Fighter
- JSIMS – (p) Joint Simulation System
- JSOA – (i) Joint Special Operations Area
- JSOTF – (i) Joint Special Operations Task Force
- JSP – (i) JavaServer Page
- JSR – (i) Java Specification Request
- JSS – (i) Joint Support Ship Project
- JSTARS – (p) Joint Surveillance Target Attack Radar System ("djay-starz")

== JT ==
- JT – (s) Johnston Atoll (ISO 3166 digram; obsolete 1986) – (i) Junior Technician (RAF) -- Jizz trumpet (Vulgar slang)
- JTAG – (p) Joint Test Action Group ("djay-tag")
- JTAGS – (p) Joint Tactical Ground Station ("djay-tagz")
- JTC – (i) Joint Training Confederation
- J-TENS – (a) Joint-Tactical Exploitation of National Capabilities
- JTF – (i) Joint Task Force
- JTFEX – (p) Joint Task Force Exercise
- JTIDS – (p) Joint Tactical Information Distribution System ("djay-tidz")
- JTLS – (i) Joint Theater Level Simulation
- JTMD – (i) Joint Theatre Missile Defence
- JTN – (s) Johnston Atoll (ISO 3166 trigram; obsolete 1986)
- JTRS – (a/i) Joint Tactical Radio System ("jitters")

== JU ==
- JU – (s) Juan de Nova Island (FIPS 10-4 territory code)
- JUGFET – (p) JUnction Gate Field-Effect Transistor
- JUICE – (p) JUpiter ICy Moon Explorer
- JUO – (i) Joint Urban Operations

== JV ==
- jv – (s) Javanese language (ISO 639-1 code)
- JV – (i) Joint Venture – Junior Varsity
- JVM – (i) Java virtual machine

== JW ==
- JW – (i) Jehovah's Witnesses
- JWARS – (p) Joint Warfare System (simulation)
- JWP – (i) Joint Warfare Publication
- JWST – (i) James Webb Space Telescope

== JY ==
- JY – (s) Japanese Yen

== JZ ==
- JZ – (i) Joint Zone
