= Jammu and Kashmir =

Jammu and Kashmir may refer to:

- Jammu and Kashmir (union territory), a region administered by India as a union territory since 2019
- Jammu and Kashmir (state), a region administered by India as a state from 1947 to 2019
- Jammu and Kashmir (princely state), a princely state of British India that existed from 1846 to 1947
- Azad Jammu and Kashmir, colloquially known as Azad Kashmir, a region administered by Pakistan as an autonomous administrative division
- Kashmir, the northernmost geographical region of the Indian subcontinent

== See also ==
- Kashmir conflict
- Aksai Chin
- Trans-Karakoram Tract
- Gilgit-Baltistan
- Ladakh
- Jammu (disambiguation)
- Kashmir (disambiguation)
- JK (disambiguation), common abbreviation
