= JRA =

JRA may refer to:

- JRA, the IATA airport code for West 30th Street Heliport
- Japan Racing Association – horse-racing
- Japanese Red Army
- Jeff Reine-Adélaïde, French footballer
- Jewish Relief Agency
- Joint Replacement Aircraft
- Johannesburg Roads Agency, South African based road agency
- The Journal of Roman Archaeology
- Juvenile rheumatoid arthritis
- Juvenile Rehabilitation Administration
- Juvenile Restoration Act
- Jamtland Republican Army – the name of the humorous independence movement of the Republic of Jamtland
