= JSP =

JSP may refer to:

== Computing ==
- Jackson structured programming
- Jakarta Server Pages, server-side Java.
- Java stored procedure (SQL/JRT)

== Organisations ==
- The Japanese School in Perth
- Jewish Settlement Police, an organization established in Mandatory Palestine in 1936.
- JSP Records, a record label.
- JSP Limited, a British-based PPE equipment manufacturer.

=== Politics ===
- Japan Socialist Party, a political party existed from 1945 to 1996 in Japan.
- Jai Samaikyandhra Party, a political party in India.
- Jana Sena Party, a political party in India.
- Jan Suraaj Party, a political party in India.

== Other uses ==
- Japanese Surrendered Personnel
- Jacketed, soft point, a soft-point bullet
- Jesup station (Amtrak station code), a train station in Georgia, US.
- Joint Schools Project, a 1960s "New Maths" project for schools in West Africa and later in the British Caribbean.
- Joint Service Publication, a UK MoD document.
- The Joseph Smith Papers, the published volumes of all of Joseph Smith's writings.
- Joseph Smith Papyri, Egyptian papyrus fragments.
