= J70 =

J70 may refer to:

- J/70, a keelboat
- LNER Class J70, a British steam locomotive class
- Metabiaugmented truncated dodecahedron
- Toyota Land Cruiser (J70), a Japanese off-road vehicle

== See also ==
- Chengdu J-7 mk 0 "Fishcan", Chinese jet fighter plane series variant of the MiG-21
- J7 (disambiguation)
- 70 (disambiguation)
- J (disambiguation)
