= JT =

JT may refer to:

== Arts and media ==
- Jakobstads Tidning, a Finland-Swedish newspaper
- Jimma Times, owner of the Ethiopian newspaper Yeroo
- Jornal da Tarde, a Brazilian newspaper from São Paulo
- JT (James Taylor album), 1977
- J.T. (Steve Earle & The Dukes album), 2021
- J.T. Lambert, a character in the American television sitcom Step by Step
- J.T. Martin, a character in the TV sitcom Silver Spoons
- JT LeRoy, a literary persona created in the 1990s by American writer Laura Albert
- J.T. Yorke, a character in Degrassi: The Next Generation

== Businesses and organizations ==
- Japan Tobacco, a large tobacco corporation
- Jersey Telecom, the Jersey telephone company
- JT, the IATA airline designator for Lion Air

== People ==
=== In arts and entertainment ===
- James "J.T." Taylor (born 1953), lead singer of the band Kool and the Gang
- JT the Bigga Figga (born 1971), a hip-hop artist and producer
- JT the Brick (born 1965), an American talk radio host
- J. T. Brown (disambiguation)
- JT Hodges (born 1977), country music singer
- JT Longoria, former member of the band Adler's Appetite
- JT Money (born 1972), American rapper
- J. T. Smith (disambiguation)
- J. T. Thomas (disambiguation)
- J. T. Walsh, American actor
- J. T. Wedgwood (1782–1856), an English line engraver
- Jerry Trainor (born 1977), American actor and comedian sometimes known as JT
- Justin Timberlake (born 1981), American singer and actor also known as JT
- JT (rapper) (Jatavia Johnson, born 1992), American rapper

=== In sport ===
- J. T. Compher (born 1995), American ice hockey player
- J. T. Miller (born 1993), American ice hockey player
- J. T. O'Sullivan (born 1979), American football player
- J. T. Realmuto (born 1991), American baseball player
- J. T. Snow (born 1968), American baseball player
- J. T. Southern (born 1964), American former professional wrestler
- J. T. Thatcher (born 1978), American football player
- JT Woods (born 1999), American football player
- Jayson Tatum (born 1998), American basketball player
- Jesse Taylor (born 1984), mixed martial artist also known as JT Money
- John Tavares (born 1990), Canadian ice hockey player
- Johnathan Thurston (born 1983), Australian rugby league footballer
- Jonathan Taylor (born 1999), American football player
- Justin Thomas (born 1993), American golfer

=== In other fields ===
- Javier Torres Félix (born 1960), Mexican drug lord also known for his alias J.T.
- J. T. Knott Jr. (born 1926), American politician
- J. T. Knott III (born 1951), American lawyer
- J.T. Larson (born 2001), American politician
- Justin Trudeau (born 1971), 23rd Prime Minister of Canada

== Science and technology ==
- Haplogroup JT (mtDNA), a human mitochondrial DNA haplogroup
- JT (visualization format), a 3D data format

== Other uses ==
- Junior technician, an airman rank
- Juneteenth
- , symbol for the Tōkaidō Main Line operated by the East Japan Railway Company, and the Itō Line
- "Javelin throw" athletics abbreviation in track and field
