= JTLS =

JTLS may refer to:

- Joint Technical Language Service, a British translation service
- Joint Theater Level Simulation, a civil/military and humanitarian assistance/disaster relief simulation
