= Gopal Kanji =

British statistician (1938–2010)

Gopal Kishore Kanji (1938 – 28 May 2010) was a British statistician.

== Early life and education ==
The son of a professor of psychology, Kanji was born in Patna, India in 1938. He obtained a bachelor's degree in mathematics and a master in statistics from Patna University.

== Career ==
Kanji moved to the UK in 1960 to join the statistics department of the University of Sheffield as a research assistant, where he later became an assistant lecturer. In 1966 he moved to the Sheffield College of Technology and remained there when it merged with other institutions to become Sheffield City Polytechnic in 1969 and Sheffield Hallam University in 1992, eventually being promoted to professor and serving as head of the Department of Applied Statistics.

In 1974 he founded a departmental journal called the Bulletin in Applied Statistics (BIAS), which later became the Journal of Applied Statistics, and remained editor until the end of 2007. He became interested in quality control and quality management in the 1980s and founded a second journal in 1990, originally named TQM Journal, later retitled Total Quality Management and Business Excellence.

He retired from Sheffield Hallam University in 2001 to concentrate on his own company offering consultancy and training.

== Personal life ==
Kanji married in 1966 and had two children and 4 grandchildren. He died of lung cancer on May 28, 2010.

== Books ==
- 100 Statistical Tests (SAGE, 1993; 3rd edition 2006) ISBN 9781847878267
- 100 methods for total quality management (with Mike Asher; SAGE, 1996) ISBN 9780803977471
- Measuring Business Excellence (Routledge, 2002; 3rd edition 2015) ISBN 9781134514816
- Management with Measurement: Can't Measure Can't Manage (with Parvesh K. Chopra, Wisdom House, 2010) ISBN 9781842901045
