= Erald Briscoe =

- Also known as: Englishman
- Origin: United Kingdom
- Genres: Reggae
- Instruments: Vocals, bass guitar
- Years active: Late 1970s–present
- Label: Mighty Roots

Erald Briscoe, also known as Englishman, is a British-born reggae musician who has recorded as a solo artist and has also played bass guitar in several bands, including Ras Michael's Sons of Negus, the Shango Band (with whom he also sings), and JFC.

== Biography ==
Briscoe was born and raised in the UK, and as a teenager was a member of the London-based Revelation Reggae Band, taking initial inspiration from players such as Paul McCartney, Stanley Clarke and Robbie Shakespeare. He then joined Ras Michael's band, with which he toured Europe. In the late 1980s he began releasing records under the name Englishman, with debut album Fighting to Survive released in 1986. backed by the Roots Vibration Band, he became popular in the United States, and he has been based for most of his life in Washington, DC.

== Discography ==
- Fighting to Survive (1986), Mighty Roots
- My African Sister (1986), Mighty Roots
- Check For the Youth (1987), Mighty Roots
- Meditations of South Africa (1987), Mighty Roots
- Roots Vibration in a Combination Stylee (1987), Mighty Roots - Englishman & Maccabee
- Man Machine Music (1989), Mighty Roots
- Shango Charisma (1992), Ras
- One Vibration (1995)
- Turning Point (1995)
- On Target (1996) - Englishman & Maccabee
- Wisdom of Steel (1999), Black Liberty
- 13 Joints!!!! (2001)
- Live in LA, Mighty Roots

Compilations

- Check For the Best (1990), Mad Dawg

=== with the Shango Band ===
- Keep It Real (2006)
- Wise Shepherd (2007), Mighty Roots
