= JFC =

JFC may refer to:

== Association football ==
- Jamshedpur FC, Jharkhand, India
- Jersey Football Combination, Jersey (league)
- Juventus FC, Turin, Italy

== Food businesses ==
- JFC International, a Japan-based supplier
- Jollibee Foods Corporation, a Philippine manufacturer

== Military ==
- Joint Force Command Brunssum, Netherlands
- Joint Force Command Naples, Italy
- Joint Force Command Norfolk, Virginia, US
- Joint Forces Command, UK (now Strategic Command)

== Music ==
- Jean F. Cochois, German DJ
- JFC Reggae Band, Arlington, Virginia, US

== Other uses ==
- Java Foundation Classes, of the programming language
- Profane form of Jesus H. Christ

== Slang ==
- Just Fucking Crazy
- Jesus Fucking Christ
