= 4J =

4J or 4-J may refer to:

- 4J Studios, a Scottish video game developer
- Somon Air's IATA code
- Eugene School District 4J
- 4J Road, a section of Wyoming Highway 50
- 4J, the production code for the 1975 Doctor Who serial The Android Invasion

In aircraft:

- TA-4J, a model of Douglas A-4 Skyhawk
- F-4J Phantom, see McDonnell Douglas F-4 Phantom II
- F-4J Phantom II, see List of McDonnell Douglas F-4 Phantom II variants
- F-4J(UK), see McDonnell Douglas F-4 Phantom II non-U.S. operators
- L-4J, a model of Piper J-3

== See also ==
- J4 (disambiguation)
