= JQS =

JQS may refer to

- Journal of Quaternary Science
- Journal of Qur'anic Studies
- Java Quick Starter, a component of the Java software platform

== See also ==
- JQ (disambiguation)
