= 7J =

7J or 7-J can refer to:

- 7J, code for Lake Oswego School District
- 7J, IATA code for Tajik Air
- MD 7J, see Maryland Route 7
- 7J, code for No. 7 (Belgian AF) Squadron RAF, see List of RAF Squadron Codes
- 7J, the production code for the 1988–89 Doctor Who serial The Greatest Show in the Galaxy

== See also ==
- J7 (disambiguation)
