= J4 =

J4/J04, J-4/J-04 or J.4/J.04 may refer to:

== In science and academia ==
- ATC code J04 Antimycobacterials, a subgroup of the Anatomical Therapeutic Chemical Classification System
- Janko group J4, in mathematics
- S/2003 J 4, a natural satellite of Jupiter
- J04 : acute laryngitis and tracheitis ICD-10 code
- Square cupola, Johnson Solid number 4

== In military ==
- Mikoyan-Gurevich MiG-17, Chinese designation of this Soviet-made aircraft is J-4
- HMAS J4, an Australian Royal Navy submarine which saw service during World War I
- Junkers J 4, a 1917 German sesquiplane format warplane
- J4F was the U.S. Navy's designation for the Grumman Widgeon seaplane.

== In transportation ==
- Airmak J4, an Italian microlight aircraft design
- Auster J-4, a 1946 British single-engined two-seat high-wing touring monoplane
- Morris Commercial J4, van made from 1960 to 1974 under the marques of Morris initially, and later, Austin and BMC
- County Route J4 (California), a road in the United States
- GS&WR Class J4, a Great Southern and Western Railway Irish steam locomotive
- JAC J4, a subcompact car
- Malaysia Federal Route J4, a major road in Johor, Malaysia
- Peterson J-4 Javelin, glider
- Piper J-4, a 1939 trainer aircraft
- Buffalo Airways International Air Transport Association code
- GNR Class J4, a class of British 0-6-0 steam locomotives
- Washington Metropolitan Transit Authority route J4, a bus route that connected College Park, Maryland and Bethesda, Maryland

== In consumer electronics ==
- Nikon 1 J4, mirrorless interchangeable lens camera
- Samsung Galaxy J4, a smartphone made by Samsung

== Other ==
- Jaws: The Revenge, also known Jaws 4
- Jarvan IV, a champion in League of Legends

== See also ==
- 4J (disambiguation)
