= Jas =

JAS or Jas may refer to:

== People ==
- Abbreviation of James (name)
- Jas Arora, Indian model and actor
- Jas Binag, Indo-British model and actor
- Jas H. Duke (1939–1992), Australian poet
- Jas Elsner (born 1962), British art historian and classicist
- Jas Gawronski (born 1936), Italian journalist and politician
- Jas Mann (born 1971), British musician

== Places ==
- Jás, a village in Romania
- Jas, Loire, a commune in France
- Jinnah Antarctic Station, operated by Pakistan
- Syrian Arab Republic, Arabic transliteration of Jumhūrīyah al-ʻArabīyah as-Sūrīyah

== Other uses ==
- JAS (band), a Peruvian rock band
- JAS 39 Gripen, a Swedish multirole combat aircraft
- JAS Motorsport, an Italian engineering company and auto racing team
- Japan Air System, a Japanese airline
- Japanese Agricultural Standard
- Jenkins Activity Survey
- Jericho Appreciation Society, a professional wrestling stable
- Journal of Applied Statistics, a statistics research journal
- The Journal of Asian Studies
- Journal of the Atmospheric Sciences
- Judge–advisor system
- New Caledonian Javanese language, ISO 639-3 code
- Industrigruppen JAS, a Swedish industrial consortium
- July, August, September, a 3-month season period
- Jamā'at Ahl as-Sunnah lid-Da'wah wa'l-Jihād, also known as Boko Haram

== See also ==
- Jace, given name
- Jayce, given name
