= JFC (reggae band) =

JFC Reggae Band, featuring Stephen Samuel
- Stephen Samuel

Background information
- Also known as: JFC Reggae Band
- Origin: Arlington, Virginia, United States
- Genres: Reggae, Calypso, Soca
- Years active: 2005–present
- Labels: Independent
- Members: Stephen Samuel- Lead Vocals, Robin Armstrong - Guitar & Vocals, Earl Carter- Guitar & Vocals, David McDavitt- Drums & Percussion, Worrel "Kango" David - Keyboards, Erald "Englishman" Briscoe- Bass, Trevor Specht - Saxophone
- Website: Myspace Profile

JFC is a reggae, calypso, and soca band based in Arlington, Virginia in the Northern Virginia / Washington, D.C. area. Starting as an active band in 2005, their music is produced independently.

== Biography ==
JFC is a multi-cultural roots reggae/soca/calypso band with members from Jamaica, Trinidad and Tobago, and the USA. Fronted by Trinidad's Stephen Samuel (Prime Minister's Cultural Entourage), JFC plays Caribbean dance rhythms, writing songs with positive messages.

Stephen Samuel began his musical career in his homeland of Trinidad circa 1960, playing soca & calypso. He was a mainstay in the showcase Calypso tents at Trinidad and Tobago Carnival in the 1970s - 1980s. Throughout the 1980s-1990s, Samuel fronted reggae & caribbean bands for the Carnival Cruise Lines.

In 2005, after a hiatus from music, Samuel formed the band JFC, attracting local musicians Earl Carter (Marcus Johnson, Experience Unlimited, P. Diddy), and Glenn Arnett (Peaches & Herb). 2008 saw the addition of African drum teacher David McDavitt(Chopteeth), and bassist Englishman (Itals, Ras Michael's Sons of Negus, Shango Band). In 2010 guitarist Robin Armstrong (Culture), and saxophonist Trevor Specht (Chopteeth), joined JFC. In 2011, keyboardist Worrel "Kango" David (Passion Reggaem TR7, DKGB, Heat Wave) joined JFC.

== Members ==
- Stephen Samuel (lead vocals)
- Worrel "Kango" David(keyboard)
- Robin Armstrong (guitar/vocals)
- David McDavitt (drums/percussion/vocals)
- Erald "Englishman" Briscoe (bass/vocals)
- Trevor Specht (saxophone)

== Discography ==
- Barack Obama (song & video) (2008)
- "Last Days" Dec 2008 tba
- Tata (Sam'O solo)] (2004)
