= JDM =

JDM may refer to:

== Organisations ==
- Avions JDM, French aircraft manufacturer
- Joe Denette Motorsports

== People ==
- Jack Della Maddalena, Australian mixed martial artist
- Jeffrey Dean Morgan, American actor

== Other uses ==
- Java Data Mining
- Japanese domestic market, for vehicles and parts
- Journal of Database Management
- Juvenile dermatomyositis, a disease
