= Civil–military operations =

Civilian interactions of a military force

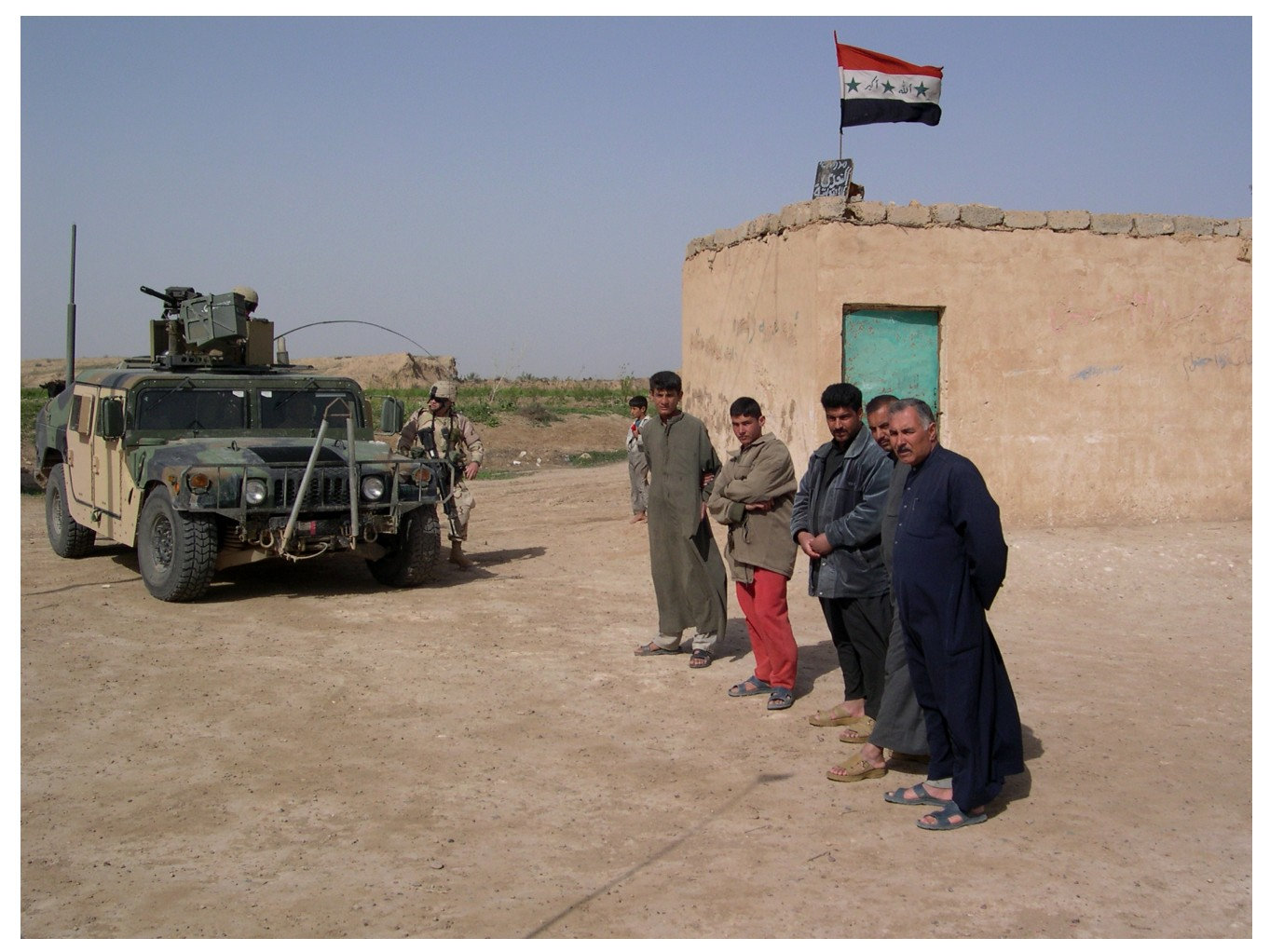
Iraqi farmers stand outside a rural school while a U.S. Army Civil Affairs team evaluates it for possible reconstruction funds (near Baghdad, April 2005).

Civil–military operations or CMO are activities of a military force to minimize civil interference on and maximize civil support for military operations. CMO is conducted in conjunction with combat operations during wartime and becomes a central part of a military campaign in counter-insurgencies. Some militaries have specialized units dedicated to conduct CMO, such as civil affairs forces or form task forces specifically for this purposes, such as a joint civil–military operations task force in the U.S. Military. Also, some militaries have staff sections dedicated to planning and coordinating CMO for their command. CMO is often called civil–military co-operation or CIMIC in NATO operations and civil–military co-ordination in UN operations.

== Official definitions ==
The Canadian Forces defines CMO as:

Military activities associated with an operation that ensure that military commanders comprehend, make use of and mitigate any negative impact of the civil environment on military operations and plans.

The U.S. Joint Chiefs of Staff defines CMO as:

The activities of a commander that establish, maintain, influence, or exploit relations between military forces, governmental and nongovernmental civilian organizations and authorities, and the civilian populace in a friendly, neutral, or hostile operational area in order to facilitate military operations, to consolidate and achieve operational US objectives. Civil–military operations may include performance by military forces of activities and functions normally the responsibility of the local, regional, or national government. These activities may occur prior to, during, or subsequent to other military actions. They may also occur, if directed, in the absence of other military operations. Civil–military operations may be performed by designated civil affairs, by other military forces, or by a combination of civil affairs and other forces.

== See also ==
- Civilian Irregular Defense Group program (historical)
- Paramilitary
