= JOA =

JOA or Joa may refer to:

- A Mithra from Windurst
- Joint operating agreement, of the US Newspaper Preservation Act of 1970
- Judgment of acquittal, a type of judgment as a matter of law
- Jøa, an island in Norway
- Joá, a neighborhood in Rio de Janeiro, Brazil
- Joa Elfsberg (born 1979), Swedish female ice hockey player

== See also ==
- Jehoash (disambiguation) or Joas
