= Cheick Hamala Diabaté =

Malian musician

Cheick Hamala Diabate
- The griot Cheick Hamala Diabate (2008).

Background information
- Origin: Kita, Mali
- Genres: Griot, Mande Afropop
- Years active: 1985–present
- Label: Independent
- Website: Official Website

Cheick Hamala Diabate is a Malian musician, who has been nominated for a Grammy Award. Using Laurel, MD as his home he travels all over the United States, Canada, Europe, and Asia. He has performed at the Kennedy Center, the United States Senate, and the Smithsonian Institution. Nephew of Rail Band guitarist, Djelimady Tounkara, Cheick Hamala was born into a griot family in Kita, Mali. From a young age, he learned to play the ngoni, a stringed instrument related to the American banjo. In addition, Cheick has learned the history of Mali passed down for over 800 years. Cheick has performed internationally.

== History ==
Cheick Hamala Diabaté is recognized as one of the world's masters of ngoni, a Malian traditional instrument, and a West African historian in the Griot tradition. A sought-after performer, lecturer, storyteller, and choreographer throughout Africa, Europe, Asia, and Canada, Cheick Hamala began touring in the U.S. in 1995. He has performed at venues such as the Krannert Center, Smithsonian Institution, the John F. Kennedy Center for the Performing Arts and NPR's Tiny Desk.

A steward of the 800-year-old tradition of the Griot, the storytellers of West Africa, Cheick Hamala shares the oral history, music, and song of his culture as it was passed on to him from birth by parent to child. At an early age, Cheick Hamala mastered the ngoni, a stringed lute and ancestor to the banjo. He learned to play the guitar from his uncle, and now plays banjo and several other instruments; but his renown remains with the historical ngoni.

At age 12, he was invited to the National Institute of Arts in Bamako, Mali's Capital, where he studied music, graphic arts, cinema, literature and theatre. He began his international performing career upon graduation.

Cheick Hamala works with notable traditional African dance companies based in the U.S. as instructor, choreographer, and performer. He also performs solo and with his ensemble, The Griot Street Band, playing traditional Manding Griot instruments. His music always reflects the historical integrity of an important art form with a rich tradition stretching back hundreds of years to the formation of the Great Malian Empire.

== Awards ==
- Grammy Award nomination (2007): Best Traditional World Music Album for From Mali to America by Cheick Hamala Diabate and Bob Carlin

== Collaborations ==
- Salif Keita
- Bela Fleck
- Corey Harris
- Bob Carlin
- Toumani Diabaté
- Chopteeth Afrofunk Big Band
- Ami Koita
- Kandia Kouyate
- Yayi Kanoute
- Fanta Disco
- Fadiala Diawara
- Meera Chakravarthy
- Rob Coltun
- Mick Moloney
- Adam Fulcher

== Discography ==
=== Albums ===
- Ake Ben Mali Denou (2013)
- Ake Doni Doni (2009)
- From Mali to America with Bob Carlin (2007)
- Kèlè Manyi Dé (2006)

== Literary mentions ==
- In Griot Time, by Banning Eyre (p. 105)
- Griots and Griottes: Masters of Words and Music, by Thomas A. Hale

== See also ==
- Ngoni
- Banjo
