= 6J =

6J or 6-J can refer to:

- IATA code for Solaseed Air (Ex Skynet Asia Airways)
- 6-j symbol
- 6J, a model of SEAT Ibiza
- Hughes MH-6J, model of Hughes OH-6 Cayuse
- AH-6J, a model of MD Helicopters MH-6 Little Bird
- AS.6J, a model of Airspeed Envoy
- 6J, designator for Clatskanie School District
- 6J6, see List of caves in Western Australia
- WS-6J, engine model in Xian H-6
- CA-6J, a model of Buhl Airsedan
- RE-6J, or Burlington Public School District; see Table of Colorado school districts
- T-6J, one of the North American T-6 Texan variants
- 6J, the production code for the 1983 Doctor Who serial The King's Demons

== See also ==
- J6 (disambiguation)
