= Jehoash =

Jehoash may refer to:

- Jehoash of Judah, Hebrew ruler (reigned c. 836–797 BCE)
- Jehoash of Israel, Hebrew ruler (reigned c. 798–782 BCE)

== See also ==
- Joash, a given name
- Yehoash, pen name of Solomon Bloomgarden (1872–1927), Lithuanian-born Yiddish poet
