= 9J =

9J or 9-J can refer to:

- 9-j symbol
- IATA code for Dana Air
- New York State Route 9J
- Le Rhône 9J
- AIM-9J, a model of AIM-9 Sidewinder
- F-9J, a model of Grumman F-9 Cougar
- GCR Class 9J, a class of British 0-6-0 steam locomotive
- France's Rotary Engine Le Rhone 9J

== See also ==
- J9 (disambiguation)
