= H-1 upgrade program =

Upgrades to U.S. Marine Corps AH-1 and UH-1 helicopters

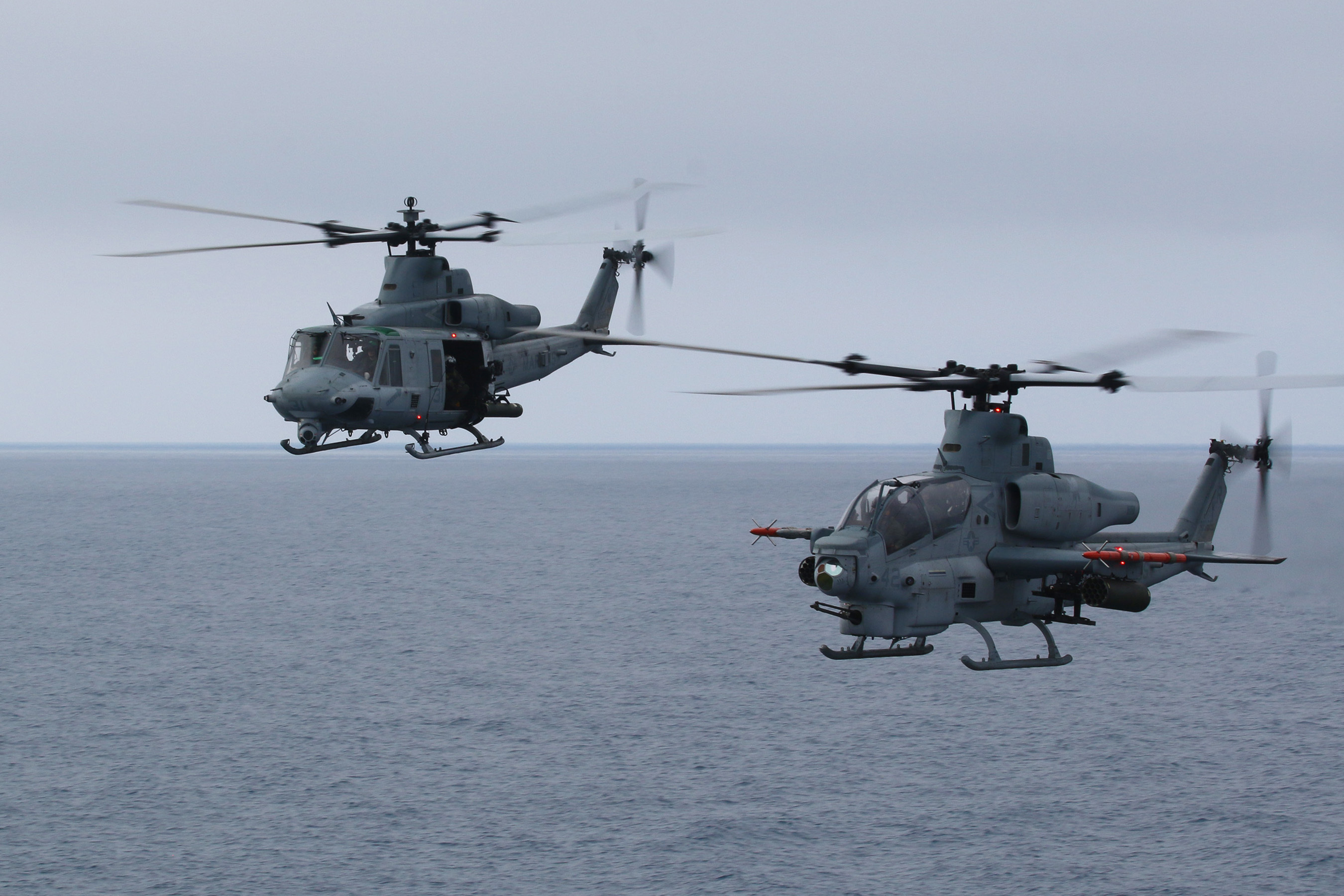
Upgraded H-1 family in flight

The H-1 upgrade program is the United States Marine Corps's program to develop the AH-1Z Viper and UH-1Y Venom military helicopters to replace its aging fleets of AH-1W SuperCobras and UH-1N Twin Hueys. The contract was awarded in 1996 to Bell Helicopter, the original manufacturer of both aircraft, to design the new airframes as modernized attack and utility helicopters with considerable design commonality, to reduce operating costs.

The upgraded type entered service starting in the early 2000s, and have become the dominant type in the USMC as the older models were slowly phased out. The upgraded types have also been exported internationally.

== Development ==
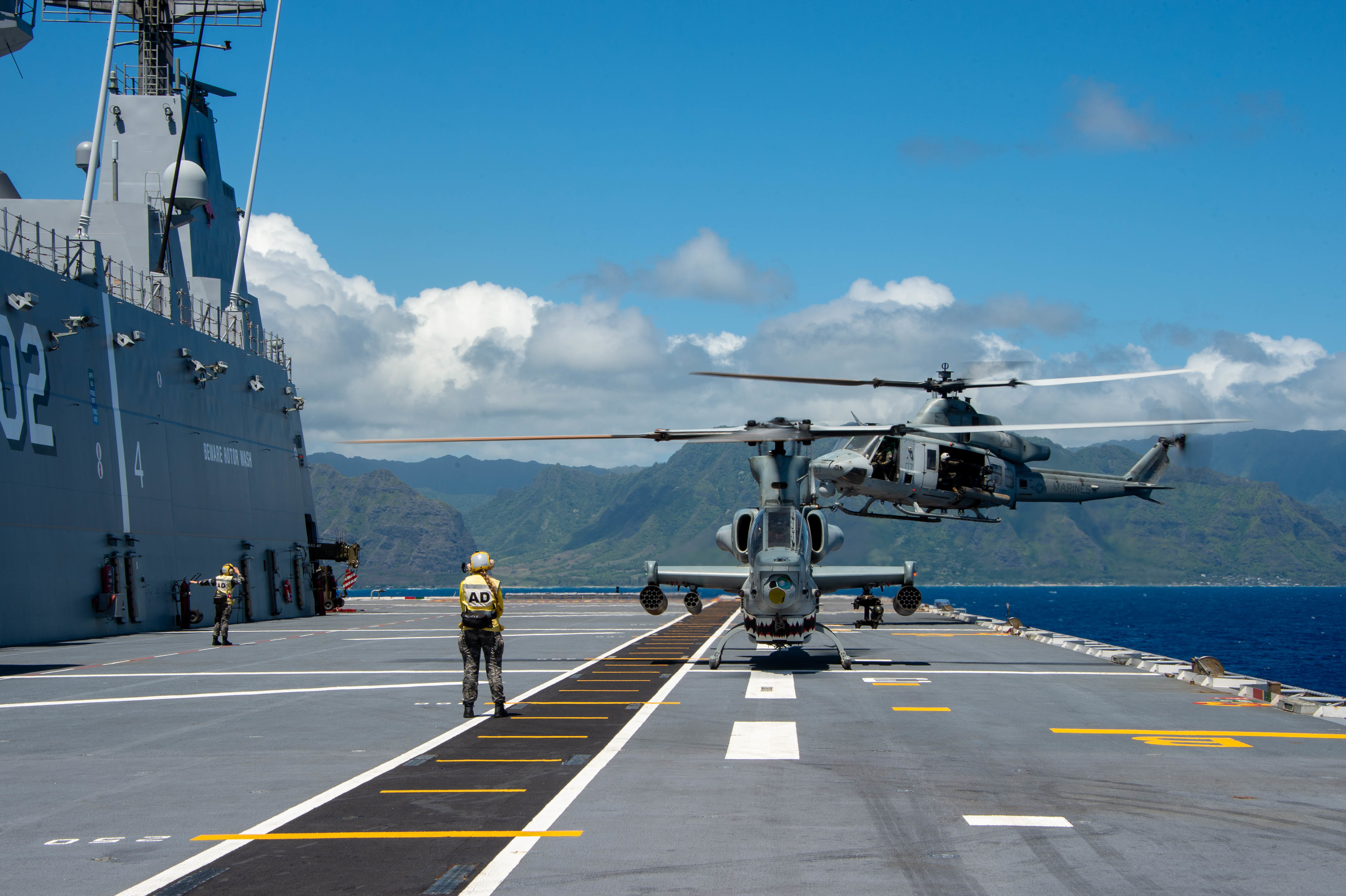
UH-1Y and AH-Z land on ship deck

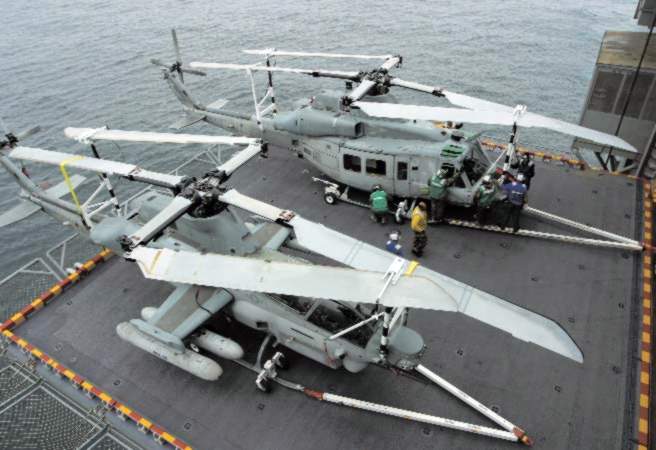
An AH-1Z Viper and a Bell UH-1Y Venom during trials aboard the USS Bataan (LHD-5) in 2005

In August 1995, the Secretary of the Navy authorized the Marine Corps to upgrade its utility and attack helicopters as a bridge until the Joint Replacement Aircraft was available in 2020. In 1996, the Marine Corps launched the H-1 upgrade program by signing a contract with Bell for upgrading 180 AH-1Ws into AH-1Zs and upgrading 100 UH-1Ns into UH-1Ys. While the original contract called for upgrading existing airframes, it was later modified in 2008 to manufacture completely new aircraft. The program also includes aircraft simulators. The AH-1Z first flew on 8 December 2000. Three prototype aircraft were delivered to NAVAIR's Naval Air Station Patuxent River in July 2002 for the flight test phase of the program. Low-rate initial production followed beginning in October 2003, with deliveries to run through 2018, however, full-rate production was delayed until 2005.

The AH-1Z completed sea-trial flight testing in May 2005. On 15 October 2005, the USMC, through the Naval Air Systems Command, accepted delivery of the first AH-1Z production helicopter to enter the fleet. During the first quarter of 2006, the first production model UH-1Y completed its first flight, and the aircraft were transferred to the Operational Test Unit at the NAS Patuxent River to begin operational evaluation (OPEVAL) testing. In February 2008, Bell received a contract for the last 40 AH-1Zs to be built as new airframes instead of the previously planned rebuild of AH-1Ws. Also that same month, the AH-1Z and UH-1Y began the second and final portion of OPEVAL testing.

Bell delivered three upgraded H-1s to the Marine Corps in February 2008. In September 2008, the NAVAIR proposed adding 46 additional AH-1Zs bringing the total number ordered to 226. The additional aircraft will appear on the 2010 fiscal budget request. The final number of UH-1Y acquisitions was also set at 123. Full-rate production was approved in late 2008.

On September 30, 2008, Bell received a contract for Lot 5 H-1 aircraft. These 15 aircraft in Lot 5 include 11 UH-1Ys and four AH-1Zs, bringing the total contracted number to 49 upgraded H-1 aircraft for the Marine Corps: 37 UH-1Ys and 12 AH-1Zs. At that time, the company had delivered 20 upgraded H-1 helicopters: 14 UH-1Ys and six AH-1Zs. On March 27, 2009, the Navy Department ordered 16 Lot 6 H-1 helicopters. The 16 aircraft in Lot 6 include five AH-1Zs and 11 UH-1Ys, bringing the total contract to produce a total of 65 upgraded H-1 aircraft: 17 AH-1Zs and 48 UH-1Ys. At the time, Bell had delivered 23 upgraded H-1 helicopters: six AH-1Zs and 17 UH-1Ys.

In May 2009, several helicopters were grounded after a manufacturer's defect was detected in the gearbox. The aircraft deployed with the 13th Marine Expeditionary Unit were not affected.

In September 2009, the UH-1Y entered full rate production, with the Marine Corps expected to receive 21 aircraft by the end of the year. The AH-1Z reached initial operational capability in September 2010, and was approved to begin full-rate production on 10 December 2010. The AH-1Z is expected to cost approximately US$27 million each.

Program manager Colonel Harry Hewson expressed interest in exporting the upgraded aircraft via Foreign Military Sales at the 2010 Farnborough Airshow.

== Upgrades ==
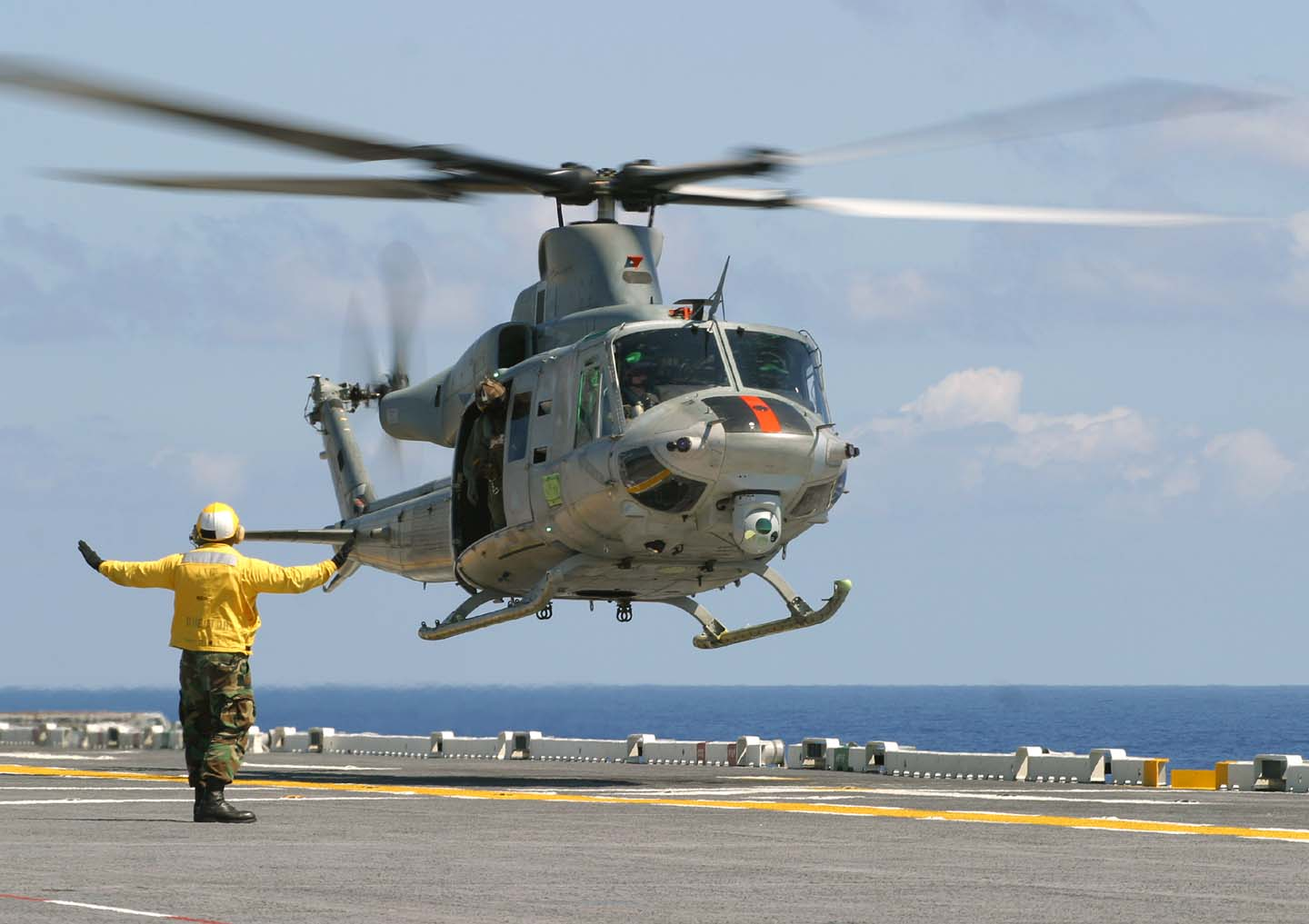
UH-1Y landing on an amphibious assault ship

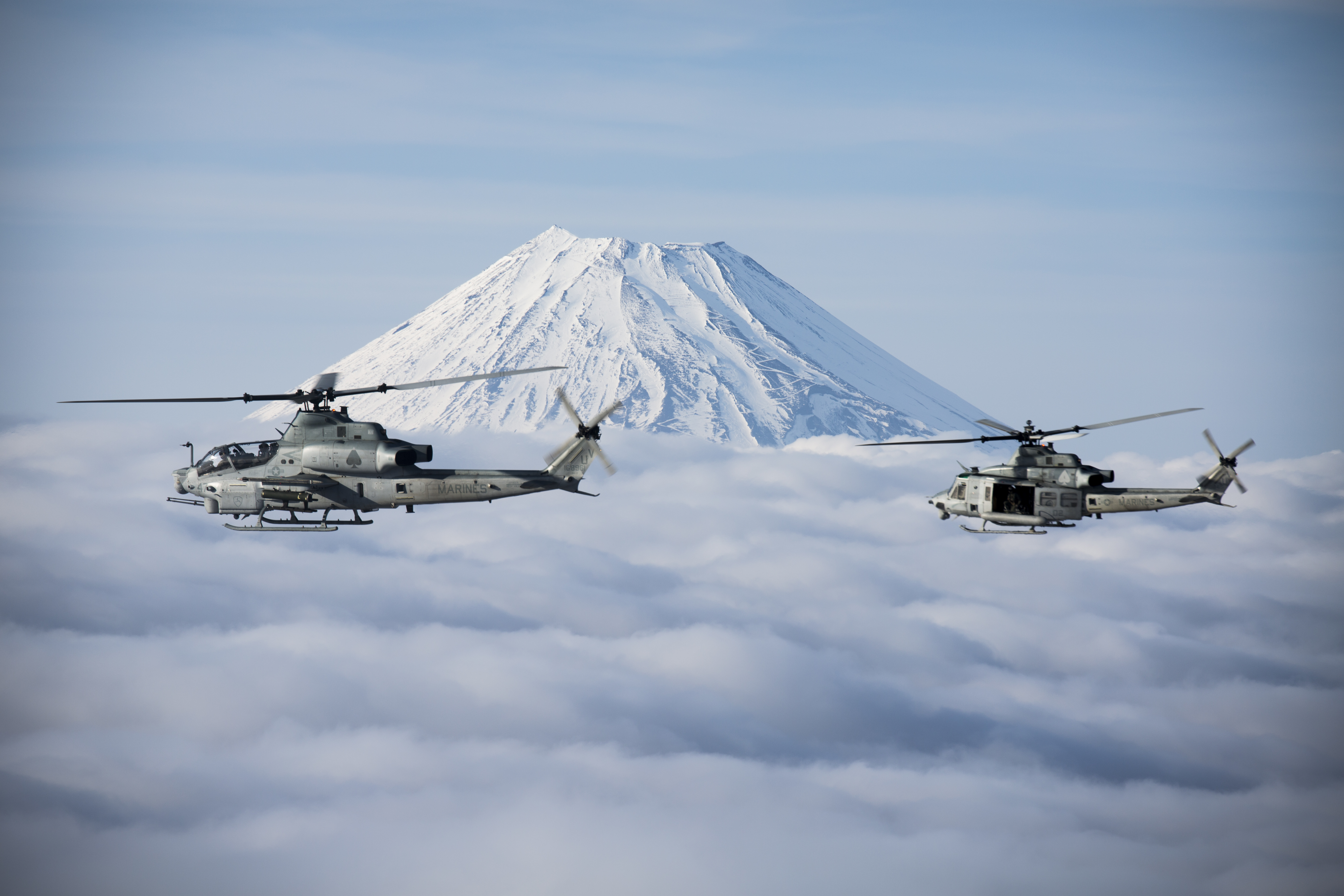
AH-1Z and UH-1Y in Japan

The stated mission of the H-1 upgrade program is to "resolve existing safety deficiencies, significantly improve operational capabilities, and reduce life-cycle costs. Commonality between aircraft will greatly enhance the maintainability and deployability of the systems with the capability to support and operate both aircraft within the same squadron structure." Reduced logistical burden, maintenance costs, and personnel requirements (all of which increase the expeditionary capabilities of the aircraft) are possible by the increased commonality of the two airframes, as well as increased reliability of individual components.

=== Common Elements ===
The AH-1Z and UH-1Y share a common tailboom, engines, rotor system, drivetrain, avionics architecture, software, controls and displays for over 84% identical components. Both aircraft use twin General Electric T700-GE-401C turboshaft outputting 1,800 shp (1,350 kW) each. Upgrades will also be made to the transmission (rated for 2,350 hp (1,750 kW)) and skid landing gear.

The existing two-bladed semi-rigid, teetering rotor system is being replaced with a four-bladed, hingeless, bearingless composite rotor system. The improvement in flight characteristics provided by the four-bladed configuration has led to increases in flight envelope, maximum speed, vertical rate-of-climb, payload and reduced rotor vibration. The rotor system has 75% fewer parts than that of four-bladed articulated systems, and the improved yokes allow for weight saving with the elimination of all bearings, hinges, and vibration absorbers in the rotor hub. The blades are made of carbon fiber-based composites, which have an increased ballistic survivability, and there is a semiautomatic folding system for stowage aboard Amphibious assault ships. Both helicopters will receive an upgraded, four-blade tail rotor and drive system.

The new integrated avionics system (IAS) has been developed by Northrop Grumman. The system includes two mission computers, an automatic flight control system (reportedly "stops short of a fly-by-wire system"), and a glass cockpit; Bell suggests the system can withstand 23 mm caliber fire. Each crew station has two 8 by 6 in (20 by 15 cm) multifunction liquid crystal displays (LCD) and one 4.2 by 4.2 in (11 by 11 cm) dual function LCD. The communications suite combines a US Navy RT-1824 integrated radio, UHF/VHF, COMSEC, and modem in a single unit. The navigation suite includes an embedded GPS inertial navigation system (EGI), a digital map system and a low-airspeed air data subsystem, which allows weapons delivery when hovering. The new cockpit systems will increase joint interoperability, now able to transmit and receive data from ground and air systems from other branches.

The Lockheed Martin Target Sight System (TSS) incorporates a third-generation FLIR sensor. The TSS provides target sighting in day, night or adverse weather conditions. The system has various view modes and can track with FLIR or by TV. It is also used on the KC-130J Harvest HAWK.

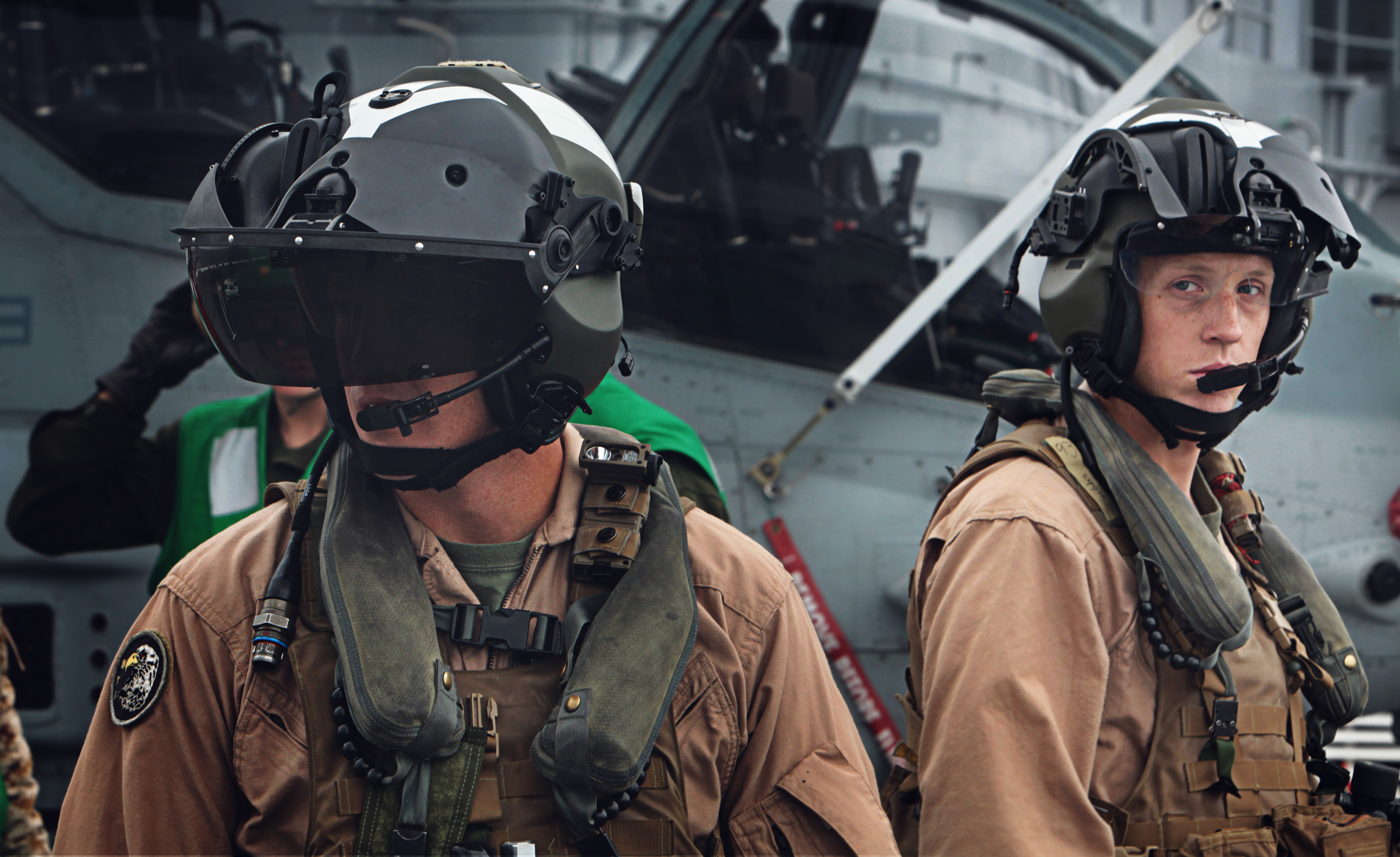
AH-1Z pilots aboard the USS Makin Island wear helmet-mounted displays

The pilot and copilot are equipped with the Thales "Top Owl" helmet-mounted sight and display system. The Top Owl has a 24-hour day/night capability and a binocular display with a 40° field of view. Its visor projection provides forward looking infrared (FLIR) or video imagery. However, the Corps has decided to augment it with existing night vision devices.

=== AH-1Z ===
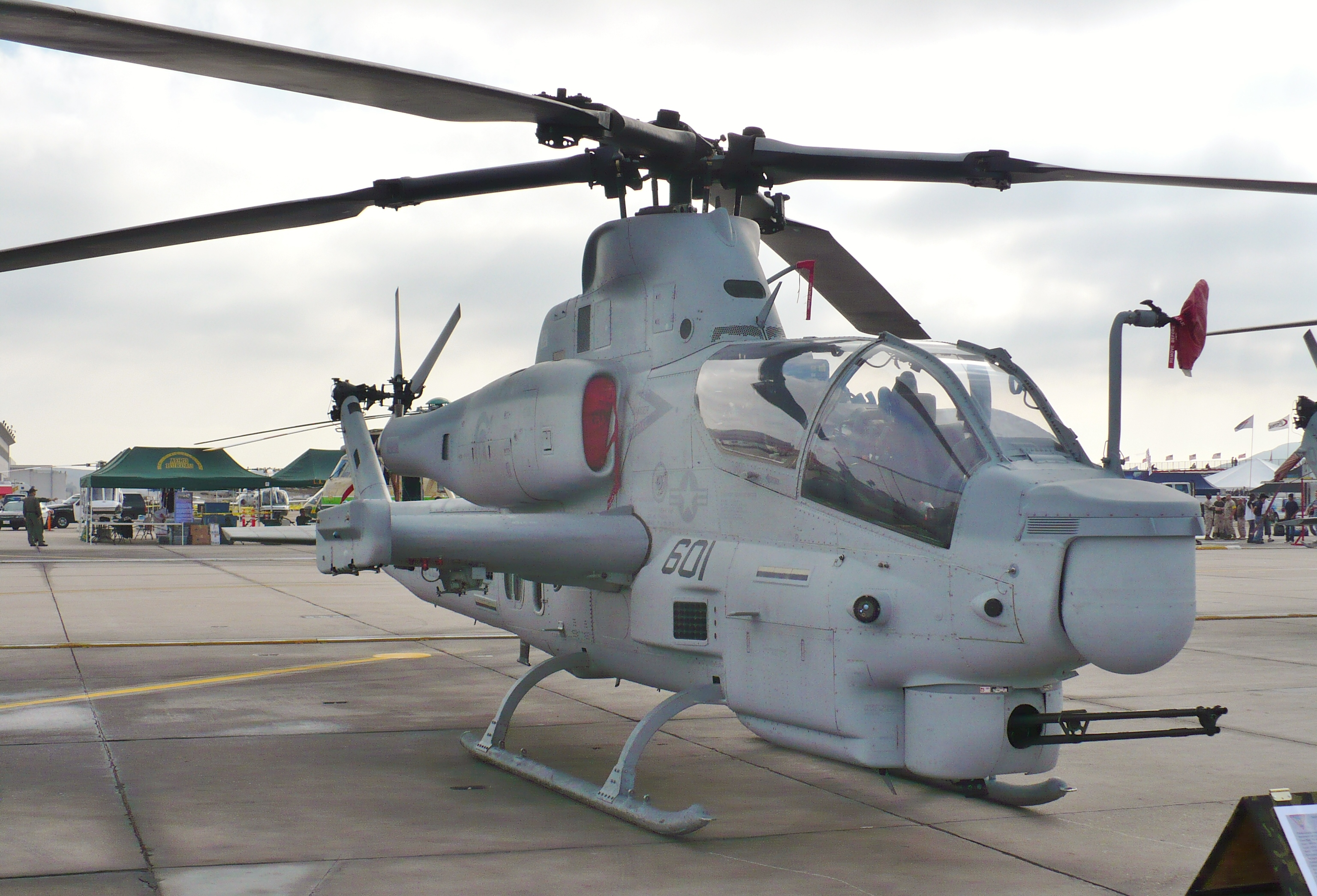
AH-1Z on the tarmac

Its two redesigned wing stubs are longer, with each adding a wingtip station for a missile such as the AIM-9 Sidewinder. Each wing has two other stations for 2.75 inches (70 mm) Hydra 70 rocket pods, or AGM-114 Hellfire quad missile launchers. The Longbow radar can also be mounted on a wingtip station. It will be able to cruise at approximately 135 to 140 knots (250 to 259 km/h) and sprint at 180 knots (330 km/h) before suffering the limits of parasitic drag.

The AH-1Z has survivability equipment including the Hover Infrared Suppression System (HIRSS) to cover engine exhausts, countermeasure dispensers, radar warning, missile warning, and laser warning systems.

=== UH-1Y ===
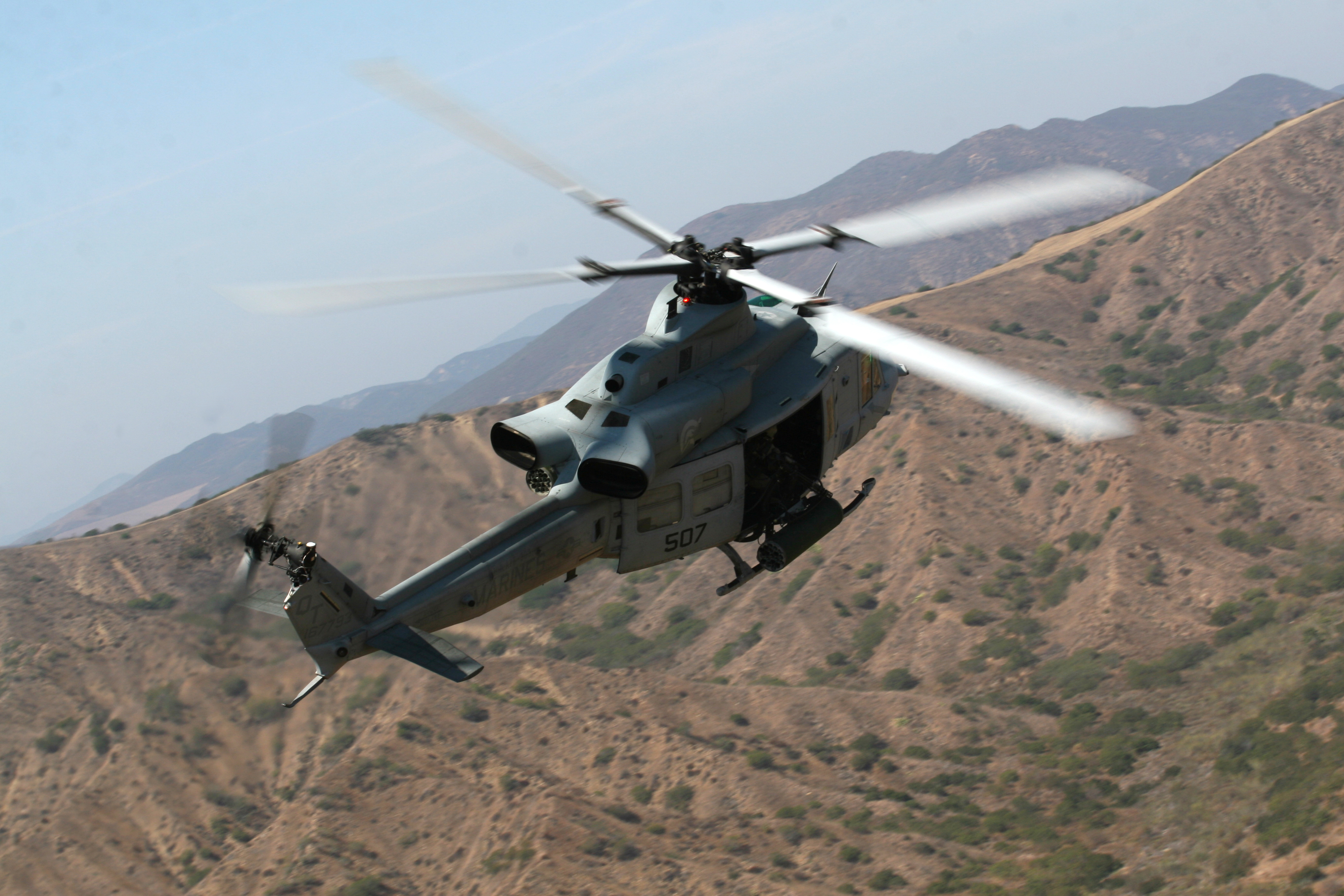
UH-Y from the rear, showing the distinctive exhaust common to both upgraded types

One of the most critical UH-1Y upgrades is in its powertrain. The UH-1N gradually became burdened with various upgrades: avionics, radios, modern door guns, and safety upgrades; all increasing the UH-1N's empty weight. With a maximum speed of approximately 100 knots (190 km/h) and an inability to lift much more than its own crew, fuel and ammunition, the UH-1N became limited in its utility. However, the UH-1Y has upgraded engines and transmission, 170% increased payload, and almost 50% greater range and maximum speed. The fuselage has been lengthened by 21 inches (53 cm) just forward of the main door for more capacity.

== Exports ==
In 2013 the upgraded helicopters were being considered by South Korea and Iraq.

=== AH-1Z Viper ===
As of 2022, the Viper has been ordered by Royal Bahraini Air Force and the Czech Air Force. Bahrain has ordered 12 and the Czech Republic has ordered 4.

Nigeria has also ordered the AH-1Z, and as of 2024 is planning to procure 12.

=== UH-1Y Venom ===
The Venom, as of 2022, was ordered by the Czech Air Force, who ordered 8 helicopters.

== See also ==
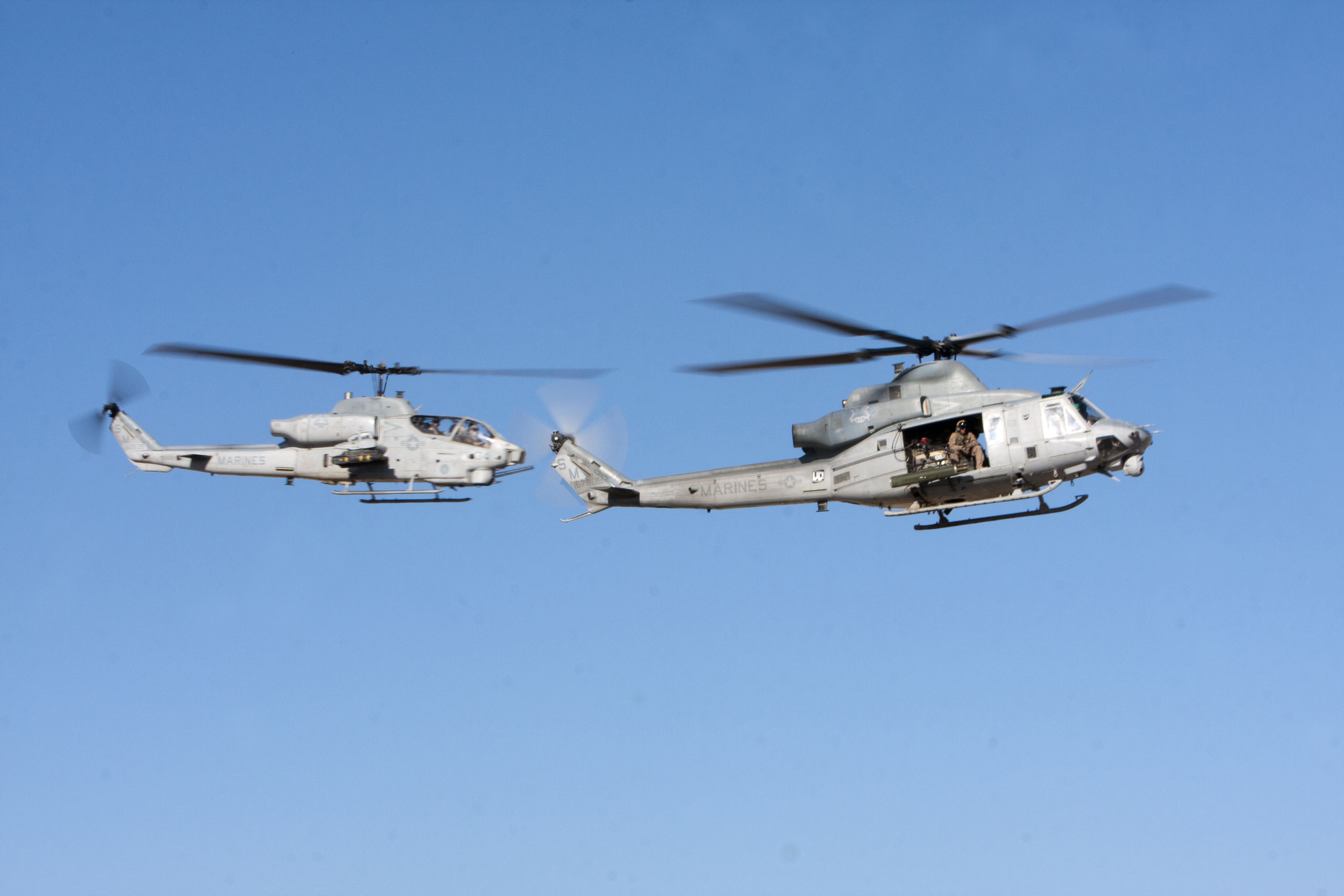
AH-1Z Viper (left) and UH-1Y Venom (right)

- Bell Huey
- United States Marine Corps Aviation
- US Helicopter Armament Subsystems

Related development

- Bell 214
- Bell 412
- Bell AH-1 SuperCobra
- Bell UH-1N Twin Huey
- Bell YAH-63

Related lists

- List of attack aircraft
- List of helicopters
- List of active military aircraft of the United States
