= J. T. Thomas =

J. T. Thomas may refer to:

- J. T. Thomas (Survivor contestant), winner of Survivor: Tocantins
- J. T. Thomas (defensive back) (born 1951), former American football defensive back
- J. T. Thomas (linebacker) (born 1988), American football linebacker
- J. T. Thomas (wide receiver) (born 1971), American football wide receiver
- Jason "JT" Thomas, American jazz drummer and member of Forq
