= J. T. Brown =

J. T. Brown may refer to:

- Two Yorkshire cricketers, both John Thomas Brown:
  - Jack Brown (cricketer) (1869–1904), cricketer for Yorkshire and England
  - John Brown (cricketer, born 1874) (1874–1950), cricketer for Yorkshire
- J. T. Brown (musician) (1918–1969), American tenor saxophonist of the Chicago blues era
- J. T. Brown (ice hockey) (born 1990), American ice hockey player
- John Thomas Brown (politician) (1857–1942)
