= J6 =

J6 may refer to:

== Military ==
- Joint Staff J-6, a directorate of the US Department of Defense
- Junkers J 6, a German fighter aircraft
- Shenyang J-6, Chinese version of Soviet MiG-19 jet fighter
- J6 Jaktfalken, a Swedish fighter aircraft
- HMS J6, a World War I UK submarine sunk in a friendly fire incident
- HMS Alresford, a UK minesweeper, pennant number J06

== Politics ==
- J6, an abbreviation for the January 6 United States Capitol attack of 2021
  - J6 Committee, The United States House Select Committee on the January 6 Attack
  - J6 hearings – Public hearings of the United States House Select Committee on the January 6 Attack
  - Justice for J6 rally, related event

== Science and technology ==
- ATC code J06 Immune sera and immunoglobulins, a subgroup of the Anatomical Therapeutic Chemical Classification System
- J06, one of the ICD-10 upper respiratory tract infection codes (J00-06)
- MGWR Class J6, successor to the MGWR Class H steam locomotive
- LNER Class J6, a class of British steam locomotives
- Pentagonal rotunda, a Johnson solid in geometry
- Samsung Galaxy J6, an Android mobile phone
- iCar 03, a battery electric compact crossover SUV sold in some markets as the Jaecoo J6 or Chery J6

== Other uses ==
- J6, the ITU prefix for the island country of Saint Lucia
- Judgement Six (J6), an evil organization from the video game series Virtua Fighter

== See also ==
- 6J (disambiguation)
