= Airmak J4 =

Italian ultralight aircraft

J4

General information
- Type: Ultralight aircraft and Light-sport aircraft
- National origin: Italy
- Manufacturer: Airmak S.r.l.
- Status: In production (2015)

History
- Manufactured: 2012-present
- First flight: early 2011

The Airmak J4 is an Italian ultralight and light-sport aircraft designed and produced by Airmak S.r.l. of Capua. The design's first flight was in early 2011. The aircraft is supplied complete and ready-to-fly.

== Design and development ==
The aircraft is produced by Airmak S.r.l., a joint venture between Rafaelle Violetti and Valter Proietti of OMA Sud. It is manufactured at OMA Sud's Italian facility. Production commenced in the middle of 2012.

The J4 was designed to comply with the Fédération Aéronautique Internationale microlight rules and US light-sport aircraft rules. It features a strut-braced high-wing, a two-seats-in-side-by-side configuration enclosed cabin accessed by doors, fixed tricycle landing gear and a single engine in tractor configuration.

The aircraft fuselage is made from welded steel tubing, with riveted aluminium tail and wings. Its 9.44 m (31.0 ft) span wing has an area of 11.6 m^{2} (125 sq ft), employs a custom Iannotta airfoil and mounts flaps. The standard engine used is the 100 hp (75 kW) Rotax 912ULS four-stroke powerplant.

As of January 2017 the design does not appear on the Federal Aviation Administration's list of approved special light-sport aircraft.

== Operational history ==
Reviewer Marino Boric described the design in a 2015 review as "elegant".

== Specifications (J4) ==
Data from Tacke and manufacturer

General characteristics

- Crew: one
- Capacity: one passenger
- Length: 7.40 m (24 ft 3 in)
- Wingspan: 9.44 m (31 ft 0 in)
- Height: 2.49 m (8 ft 2 in)
- Wing area: 11.6 m^{2} (125 sq ft)
- Airfoil: Iannotta
- Empty weight: 330 kg (728 lb)
- Gross weight: 600 kg (1,323 lb)
- Fuel capacity: 108 litres (24 imp gal; 29 US gal)
- Powerplant: 1 × Rotax 912ULS four cylinder, liquid and air-cooled, four stroke aircraft engine, 75 kW (101 hp)
- Propellers: 3-bladed composite

Performance

- Cruise speed: 200 km/h (120 mph, 110 kn)
- Stall speed: 60 km/h (37 mph, 32 kn) flaps down
- Never exceed speed: 280 km/h (170 mph, 150 kn)
- Range: 1,070 km (660 mi, 580 nmi)
- Service ceiling: 6,100 m (20,000 ft)
- g limits: +3.8/-2,2
- Rate of climb: 4.5 m/s (890 ft/min)
- Wing loading: 51.7 kg/m^{2} (10.6 lb/sq ft)

Avionics

- Garmin Geopilot Plus 2
