= Joint Replacement Aircraft =

The Joint Replacement Aircraft (JRA) was a program initiated by the US Defense Department project to build a common utility aircraft that would replace the UH-1N Twin Huey and AH-1 SuperCobra in service with the United States Marine Corps.

In August 1995, the Secretary of the Navy authorized the Marine Corps to upgrade its utility and attack helicopters as a bridge until the Joint Replacement Aircraft was available in 2020. The Marine Corps hoped to replace the UH-1N and AH-1W with the JRA by 2015, and a number of designs for the JRA were explored, including a tiltrotor.
