= Joint Theater Level Simulation =

The Joint Theater Level Simulation (JTLS) is used to simulate joint, combined, and coalition civil-military operations at the operational level. Used for civil/military simulations and humanitarian assistance/disaster relief (HA/DR) scenarios, JTLS is an interactive, computer-assisted simulation that models multi-sided air, ground, and naval resources with logistical Special Operation Forces (SOF) and intelligence support. The primary purpose of JTLS is to create a realistic environment in which agency staff can operate as they would within a real-world or operational situation.also information.A training audience conducts a scenario or event to practice their ability to coordinate various staff functions.

== Overview ==
Development of JTLS began in 1983 as a project funded by the U.S. Readiness Command, the U.S. Army War College, and the U.S. Army Concepts Analysis Agency. JTLS was created and continues to be developed and managed by ROLANDS & ASSOCIATES Corporation (R&A), based at Monterey, California. Until 1986, R&A worked under the direction of Jet Propulsion Laboratory. R&A has provided support to U.S. Joint Staff Directorate for Joint Force Development (J7) management of JTLS and has been actively improving the model since its inception. JTLS is currently used by all U.S. combatant commands, U.S. Services, the Naval Postgraduate School, NATO, and several non-U.S. defense agencies and commercial companies. Planners use JTLS for training support and for mission planning and rehearsals.

The JTLS model is theater and doctrine independent and does not require knowledge of programming to use effectively. JTLS supports a terrain area of 2,000 by 2,000 nautical miles and also supports operations, such as strategic air and ships, outside this area. Users interact with the model through a graphical user interface that uses a web browser to interact with the simulation. JTLS may be operated on a single computer or networked computers at a single location or at multiple distributed sites. Model features include Lanchester attrition algorithms for adjudication of ground force interaction, detailed logistics modeling, and explicit air, ground, and naval unit movement, whether civil or military. The JTLS system is also designed to aid in scenario database preparation and verification, entering simulation directives, and obtaining situational information from graphical map displays, messages, and status reports.

JTLS represents the operational level of civil-military strategies, but also employs significant tactical-level capabilities. JTLS can represent a maximum of ten independent Force Sides, each with individual Side relationships and rules of engagement. Each Side can be assigned unlimited Factions. The simulation supports links to most real-world command and control, communications, computer, and intelligence (C4I) systems. The model has been federated with other models through customized interfaces, including the Joint Conflict and Tactical Simulation (JCATS) developed by Lawrence Livermore National Laboratories.

JTLS and JCATS have been integrated within the Joint Multi-Resolution Model (JMRM) Federation as core models. JTLS provides high-level aggregate representation while JCATS provides entity-level representation. To support this federation, JTLS includes an Entity Level Simulation (ELS) component that provides entity templating of its aggregate units to further enhance its capabilities. Both models are High Level Architecture (HLA) compliant.

The U.S. Joint Staff Directorate for Joint Force Development (J7) manages the JTLS program. The J7 Configuration Control Board (CCB) controls the software development and enhancement process. JTLS improvements reflect customer, U.S., NATO, and commercial client upgrade requests. However, specific new modeling and system capabilities are the result of CCB decisions that consider the costs and benefits of each improvement. Approved requirements are prioritized and implemented. This variety of guidance provides a continuously moving baseline from which JTLS evolves much faster than similar projects.

== JTLS Modules ==
Core Components

The JTLS system is composed of several modules, including applications and databases, which interact to simulate a real-world battlefield environment. The basic JTLS modules include:

- Combat Events Program (CEP) and its support programs
- JTLS Object Distribution Authority (JODA) data server
- Web Enabled JTLS services: Apache data server, XML Message Service (XMS), Synchronized Application Preferences Service (SYNAPSE), Order Management Authority (OMA), and JTLS XML Serial Repository (JXSR)
- Web Hosted Interface Program (WHIP), a Web-enabled graphical user interface

The CEP is the adjudication module and central component of JTLS. This module determines all of the actions and interactions among the units that are described in the scenario database. These units may be entirely military, civilian, or a combination, depending on the particular scenario being developed. The CEP creates, maintains, and reports the current status of an executing scenario, whether it represents a combat, civil-military operations, or analysis environment.

A Transmission Control Protocol/Internet Protocol (TCP/IP) socket connection establishes communication between the CEP and a JODA database server. The JODA receives an initial data download and periodic updates from the CEP, and also communicates with the WHIP and other client programs that are assigned to it.

User inputs to JTLS are in the form of orders entered into a WHIP and transmitted to the CEP for processing via the JTLS Object Distribution Authority (JODA). Users receive information from the CEP and the database server in the form of graphics updates, messages, and Information Management Tool (IMT) tabular data display updates.

Web Enabled JTLS

JTLS is the first distributed simulation to utilize Internet technology. Due to advances in data compression, support for distributed exercises is no longer constrained by costly dedicated communication lines. The ability to use any Web browser and Java® software relieves the user community of purchasing proprietary hardware and software to use JTLS. Worldwide exercises can be conducted from a single simulation center with sufficient Internet connectivity. Smaller exercises, distance learning, and training can be conducted at locations where minimal bandwidth is available. The use of Extensible Markup Language (XML) output files has enhanced the model's capability to link simulation output to real-world C4I devices.

There are many WHIP presentations of scenario data that JTLS users may view during their interaction with the simulation. The scenario map may be displayed alone at various zoom levels or, in this case, combined with multiple information displays.

The unique features of the Web Enabled JTLS (WEJ) architecture and workstation interface allow JTLS users to:

- Use a local PC as a client workstation.
- Work with the Linux operating system on servers.
- Tailor individual user preferences for local workstations.
- Use context-sensitive order panels on Map overlays for situational awareness.
- Use an interactive unit hierarchy display to manage civil-military conflict and logistics.

The WEJ provides users the advantage of purchasing a PC-based CPU platform and using a Linux operating system, instead of more costly, proprietary CPUs and operating systems. Porting JTLS to Linux for the JTLS user workstations permitted the use of desktop and laptop PCs instead of Unix CPUs (servers are now supported by Linux). Other open source technology, including Web browsers, Java, the Apache Server®, and the OpenMap mapping tool, are extensively used to support the WEJ implementation. Although this technology is still evolving, the expanded capability that the WEJ brings to the USJS J7, NATO, and Partnership for Peace (PfP) consortiums will make conducting coalition and multinational training more feasible and cost-effective. The Training Transformation has provided the venue for the WEJ to play a critical role in worldwide joint training.

The Web Enabled JTLS Version 3.0, which JFCOM released to its user community in May 2005, significantly reduced the cost of shipping equipment and corresponding personnel requirements at forward locations. Simulation operators use Web browsers and Web-based connections to participate in JTLS events. The Web-enabled capability allows JTLS users to leverage existing wide area network (WAN) and local area network (LAN) connections to log on to the simulation from workstations or personal computers. The advantage of the Web-enabled capability is a significant cost reduction for joint exercises.

JTLS 3.0 was integrated with the Joint Deployment Logistics Model (JDLM) and the Joint Conflict and Tactical Simulation (JCATS) through the HLA. By federating with simulations like JDLM and JCATS, the unique capabilities of other models have increased the fidelity of logistics and high-resolution capabilities, thus creating an improved environment for multiple training audiences.

During 2006, JTLS 3.0 was used to support the Bright Star 06, Vigilant Shield 06, and Terminal Fury 06 training events. USJFCOM accepted and implemented JTLS 4.0, released in December 2010. JTLS will continue to evolve to support the joint trainer community.

System Support Programs

R&A provides a suite of software tools with each JTLS delivery to allow effective and efficient use of the simulation. The major support programs described in this section assist users to develop, maintain, and modify their scenario databases.

Database Development System

The Database Development System (DDS) is the primary JTLS database development and modification tool used to build a new database, modify an existing database, or query an existing database for filtered information. The DDS is an application of the Oracle Server®, a relational database management system.

The ASCII data files that define the initialization database for a selected scenario are uploaded to fill a set of Oracle tables designed to be compatible with the JTLS database structure. DDS users can access these tables to modify or query the data they contain. When modifications are complete, the data are downloaded to create a new set of JTLS initialization data files for that scenario.

The DDS has been recently re-implemented on an alternative open source platform that is deployed through the Oracle GlassFish® J2EE-compliant server. The GlassFish server supports a Web-enabled methodology for the DDS and is used as an interface to the database to serve Web pages and store developer changes from these pages. This system allows users to interact with the certified Oracle database server.

Scenario Initialization and Verification Programs

The Scenario Initialization Program (SIP) is a suite of tools used to prepare a scenario that has not been run previously for a JTLS game. The Scenario Verification Program (SVP) enforces the consistency of the scenario data files. The output from this program lists errors and possible inconsistencies that may be present in these data.

Online Player Manual

The Online Player Manual (OPM) provides access to a series of HTML files that contain formatted scenario initialization data. An OPM can be generated from the game start data or data associated with a checkpoint. Players can use a Web browser to access this information and navigate the HTML pages. These files display static information from their source data and are not continuously updated as the game progresses.

Lanchester Development Tool

The Lanchester Development Tool (LDT) enables the implementation of the Lanchester attrition model that is used to assess the results of force-on-force land combat in JTLS. The LDT uses computing parameters input by database developers to generate data that the simulation uses to determine the outcome of Lanchester combat events. The LDT also provides a verification function that allows users to view in tabular format the results of a long-term battle between two or more units.

Graphical Database Program

The Graphical Database Program (GDP) allows graphical placement of units and targets and the creation or modification of National Boundaries and Areas of Operations. This module extracts current scenario information from the DDS/Oracle database and displays it on a WHIP. In addition to manipulation of game objects, the GDP allows modification of terrain data. The WHIP’s map component can be used to view specific areas of the hexagon grid and the individual hex attributes (terrain type, barrier type, and hex elevation) can be modified. User updates are written directly to the Oracle database.

Equipment

Equipment required to execute JTLS is configured to adapt the use of the simulation to an academic, analysis, training, or exercise environment. JTLS can be executed on an optimized desktop or laptop computer, or a network of servers and client workstations. Simple vignettes can be successfully executed on a single Linux-based computer. One computer may also be used to execute the model for small groups of simulation trainees, while larger training groups typically require a network configuration.

== Brief Development History ==
1982 – The U.S. Readiness Command initially funded the JTLS project for analysis of joint, combined, and coalition operations plans.
1990 – JTLS was used to train coalition forces and conduct mission rehearsals to prepare for the 1991 Operation Desert Storm.
1992 – An Air Tasking Order (ATO) generator was added to automatically compile and execute air operations orders from Universal Military Text Format (USMTF) ATOs. JTLS was expanded to support ten Force Sides, enabling more comprehensive coalition training and analysis of warfare.
1996 – Distribution of JTLS to foreign and domestic non-U.S. Government clients was permitted with U.S. State Department approval.
2003 – JTLS was used to evaluate courses of actions (COA) and conduct mission rehearsals for U.S. and coalition forces during Operation Iraqi Freedom.
2005 – State-of-the-art Internet technologies were integrated into JTLS to create the first Web-enabled U.S. Department of Defense simulation.
2007 – JTLS incorporated enhanced links to TBMCS, GCCS, ADSI, and other U.S., NATO, and international real-world C4I devices.
2008 – JTLS was integrated with JFCOM's entity-level joint model, the Joint Conflict and Tactical Simulation (JCATS), to provide a tactical and strategic multi-echelon training capability.
2009 – R&A developed links between JTLS and Google Earth for Common Operational Picture (COP) and TADIL-J support. Missile launch and projected elliptical point of impact capabilities for GCCS and Blue Force Tracker (BFT) were introduced. Naval mine warfare and intelligence modeling were enhanced.

Evolutionary Model Development and Implementation

The Joint Staff is the JTLS project proponent and program manager. The Joint Staff Program Manager for JTLS conducts annual Configuration Control Board (CCB) meetings, and manages project requirements and user requests for model functional enhancements. The U.S. Department of State controls the distribution of JTLS software. One of the Joint Staff's primary roles for the JTLS project is to manage these evolving requirements and prioritize them to best serve the user community. A Configuration Management Plan (CMP) details the policies and procedures established by the Joint Staff that are applicable to all JTLS hardware, software, databases, and associated documentation.

The Joint Staff, JTLS development team, and JTLS user community continue to collaborate for the continued improvement and use of JTLS by the Department of Defense and the allied partners of the United States.

== JTLS User Community ==
A Cooperative Research and Development Agreement (CRADA) was established in 1996 between R&A and the U.S. Government that identified and authorized R&A to be the sole source for the distribution of JTLS to non-U.S. International users of JTLS include:

- Australian Department of Defence: Australian Joint Warfare Doctrine and Training Centre (JWDTC); RAAF Base Williamtown, New South Wales, Australia
- French Ministry of Defence: Commandement Pour les Opérations InterArmées (CPOIA); Centre de Simulation pour la Formation, l'Entraînement et l'Expérimentation (CSFEE), Paris, France
- Hellenic National Defense General Staff (HNDGS): War Games & Simulation Center; Athens, Greece
- Italian Joint Operations Headquarters J7 Division (Exercises); Rome, Italy
- Mitsubishi Electric Corporation (MELCO), Kamakura Works; Tokyo and Kanagawa, Japan
- Republic of Korea Air Force, Air University; Taejon-City, Republic of Korea
- Malaysian Armed Forces (MAF) Headquarters, Joint Warfare Centre, Ministry of Defense; Kuala Lumpur, Malaysia
- NATO Communications and Information Agency (NCI-Agency); The Hague, Netherlands
- NATO Modeling & Simulation Center of Excellence (M&S COE); Rome, Italy
- NATO Joint Warfare Centre (JWC); Stavanger, Norway
- NATO Joint Force Training Centre (JFTC); Bydgoszcz, Poland
- Norwegian Joint Headquarters (NJHQ); Tverlandet, Norway
- Pakistani Ministry of Defence, National Defence University (NDU); Islamabad, Pakistan
- Polish Ministry of Defence, National Simulation and Wargame Centre (NS&WGC); Warsaw, Poland
- Royal Saudi Armed Forces Command and Staff College, Riyadh, Saudi Arabia
- Slovenian Ministry of Defense, Slovenia Armed Forces Simulation Center; Ljubljana, Slovenia
- Spanish Ministry of Defense, Ingenieria de Sistemas para la Defensa de Espaňa (ISDEFE); Madrid, Spain
- Taiwanese Ministry of National Defense, Joint Exercise & Training Center (JETC); Taipei, Republic of China (Taiwan)
- Royal Thai Armed Forces Headquarters (RTARFHQ), Joint Staff College; Bangkok, Thailand
- Turkish Ministry of National Defence, Turkish War Colleges; Istanbul, Turkey
- UAE Air Force & Air Defence, Air Force Strategic Analysis Center (AFSAC); Abu Dhabi, United Arab Emirates
- UAE General Headquarters, UAE Armed Forces, Joint Command and Staff College (JCSC); Abu Dhabi, United Arab Emirates

== Federations ==
Joint Multi-Resolution Model (JMRM)

The JTLS-JCATS federation satisfies a warfighter requirement for multi-level training. During the process of developing the federation, R&A, Lawrence Livermore National Laboratory (LLNL), NATO, and the USJFCOM gained insight into Multi-Resolution Modeling (MRM) necessitated by federating two simulations whose architectures are unique and have different resolutions. JTLS is a hexagon-based, time-stepped simulation that uses Lanchester equations to adjudicate conflict between ground-based, aggregate-level objects, typically battalions or brigades. It simulates other air, sea, and logistics objects at the entity level. JCATS adjudicates combat between entity-level objects, typically individual vehicles or combatants. JTLS and JCATS are event-driven simulations. The JTLS-JCATS federation, known as JMRM, leverages the strengths of each simulation by allowing objects to be represented at the level of resolution needed for achieving training and analysis objectives. The federation allows the control of federation objects to pass from one simulation to the other, and employs mechanisms that permit objects represented at different levels of resolution and controlled by each simulation to interact.

JTLS-GCCS-NATO C2 Federation

The Global Command and Control System (GCCS) is the battlefield situation display and information management system for Theater (warfare) and joint task force level commanders and their staffs. The JTLS-GCCS-NATO C2 federation was developed to examine the use of high-level architecture (HLA) to build interfaces between command and control (C2) systems and simulations. The federation comprises a set of multinational command and control systems (GCCS and the NCIA ICC Air Track display) and exercise support tools. The federation is a partnership of three organizations: the Defense Information Systems Agency (DISA), the U.S. Joint Staff Directorate for Joint Force Development (J7), and the NATO Consultation, Command and Control Agency. Each organization has a vested interest in finding affordable and extensible approaches to the task of linking combat simulations to fielded C2 systems to support training. The Defense Modeling and Simulation Office (DMSO) joins the partnership to provide the HLA, the enabling technology that serves as the foundation for linking C2 systems to simulations.

During 1999, the federation team worked toward the goal of transitioning the federation to the USJS J7 and NCIA for use in computer-aided exercises. The JTLS team redesigned and reimplemented the Run-Time Infrastructure (RTI) interface module to improve stability and performance during federation execution. The GCCS team experimented with the implementation of a two-way data flow, allowing naval orders to be sent from the GCCS workstation to JTLS. The NC3A team added two new federates, the Air and Naval Order Translation Modules, to improve usability of the federation during exercises. Extensive testing during the year helped to improve the performance and reliability of the federation with large exercise-level scenarios.

Discussions on integrating JTLS with JCATS, VBS2, and Flames models as part of the NATO Training Federation (NTF) were conducted between members of NATO in 2011.

== MOOTW - Simulating Humanitarian Assistance and Disaster Relief Events ==
Military operations, as defined in Joint Publication 3-07, Joint Doctrine for Military Operations Other Than War (MOOTW), are missions with objectives dedicated to peace operations, humanitarian assistance, recovery operations, noncombatant evacuation operations, arms control, combating terrorism, counter-drug operations, enforcement of sanctions or maritime intercept operations, enforcement of exclusion zones, ensuring freedom of navigation and overflight, protection of shipping, show of force operations, strikes and raids, and support to insurgency.

JTLS was originally designed to model warfare, defined as “large-scale, sustained combat operations to achieve national objectives or to protect national interests.” MOOTW “focuses on deterring war and promoting peace.” JTLS has capabilities that can be effectively applied to MOOTW. Additionally, several special capabilities dedicated to MOOTW operations representation have been designed. For example, the representation of High Resolution Units (HRUs) in JTLS is an appropriate functionality for the small-unit level at which many MOOTW are executed. The JTLS representation of Force Sides and Factions can reflect the political objectives that are a primary consideration for the strategic and tactical planning of all MOOTW missions.

JTLS is used to support disaster preparedness exercises. An entire exercise may be designed to address a single or multiple disaster scenarios with the anticipated disaster relief and recovery operations. In this manner, JTLS capabilities are used to represent natural and man-made disasters, and subsequent disaster relief operations.

JTLS scenarios that represent various types of disaster events can be effectively designed and executed. For example, major area flooding that results from a dam breach, or a hurricane affecting a coastal environment, are modeled in JTLS using its capabilities to represent weather conditions, geographical areas, terrain characteristics, major facility operations or failures, and the mobility of land units, ships, and aircraft. JTLS Air Missions are used to place rescue or assistance HRUs in the impacted area to transport supplies or remove injured and stranded people. Logistics data is used to represent supplies, stockage levels, and shortages of food and medicine. Input from game operators in the form of Player or Controller orders that control the activities of these units, or database External Events, are used to direct and interact with the deployed civilian or military forces.

Other aspects of disaster scenarios that affect civilian populations or military operations can be similarly represented, such as weather disruption to aviation, crop or fire damage, earth-quakes, landslides, refugee transport or relief operations, and major facility or power grid failure. These types of situations and events have been simulated by several agencies in JTLS-supported exercises.

== See also ==
- Wargaming
- Modeling and simulation
- Military Simulation
- Military Operation
- Operations Research
