= JFF =

JFF may refer to:

- Jagran Film Festival, India
- Japanese Film Festival, Singapore
- Jamaica Football Federation
- Jacksonville Film Festival, United States
- Warsaw Jewish Film Festival, Poland
- Zagreb Jewish Film Festival, Croatia
