= Jewish Relief Agency =

Jewish charity organization

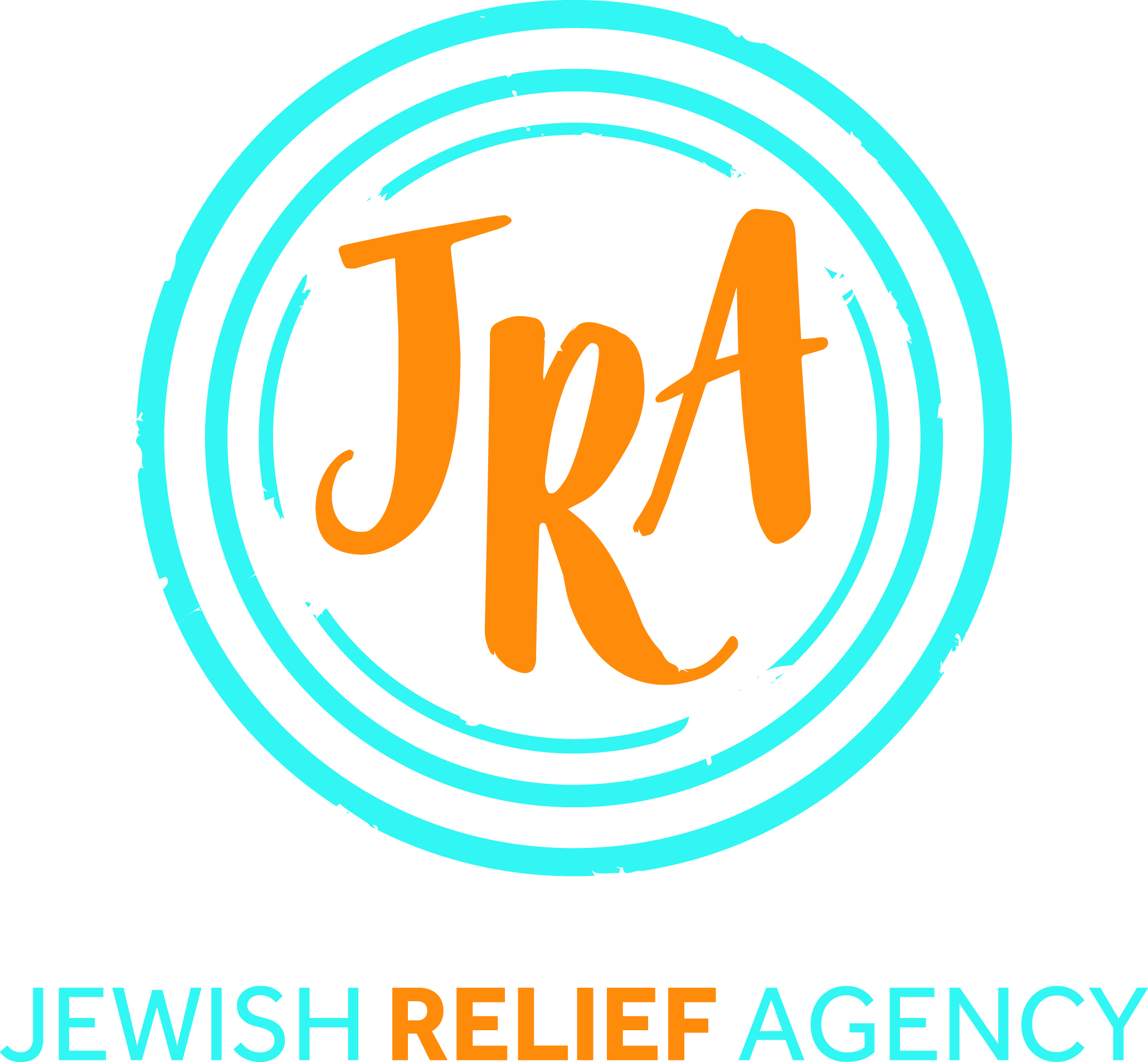
- Abbreviation: JRA
- Founded: Incorporated April 14, 2008; 18 years ago
- Founders: Marc Erlbaum, Rabbi Menachem Schmidt
- Tax ID no.: 26-2578017
- Legal status: 501(c)(3) nonprofit organization
- Headquarters: Bala Cynwyd, Pennsylvania, United States
- Region served: Greater Philadelphia area, Chicago, Greenwich, Connecticut, Pittsburgh, MetroWest New Jersey, South Jersey
- Services: Helps needy Greater Philadelphia area individuals by providing monthly food packages and assisting with home repairs and daily tasks they are unable to do on their own, enabling them to live successfully in their own homes. Provides support, leadership, and resources to assist other communities throughout the country to build hunger relief programs.
- President: Marc Erlbaum
- Treasurer: Greg Jaron
- Revenue: $1,086,329 (2014)
- Expenses: $906,238 (2014)
- Employees: 6 (2018)
- Volunteers: 15,500 (2013)
- Website: www.jewishrelief.org

The Jewish Relief Agency (JRA) is a charitable organization and independent 501(c)(3) nonprofit organization which serves over 6,000 diverse low-income individuals across Greater Philadelphia.

The JRA primarily relies on volunteers who serve in a variety of ways, including packing boxes in its Northeast Philadelphia warehouse, delivering boxes of food to 90 zip codes in the Philadelphia area, providing seniors and disabled people rides to the doctor and grocery store, making, and visiting isolated members of the community. Volunteers come from diverse backgrounds and a wide range of community organizations including Jewish camps, Hillel branches, synagogues and churches, colleges, schools, and corporations. Before the COVID-19 pandemic, on an average 1,000 volunteers participated monthly to pack and deliver food packages at JRA's Food Distributions.

The organization serves mostly elderly and Jewish clients, 73% of whom are over 65 and 65% of whom are Jewish, but it also serves people of all ages and backgrounds.

== Founding and history ==
In order to help low income Jewish families in the Greater Philadelphia Jewish community, the Agency was founded in September 2000 by Marc Erlbaum and Rabbi Menachem Schmidt with funding from private donors and the Jewish Federation of Greater Philadelphia. They began with three volunteers serving 16 Russian speaking families with just one U-haul truck and purchased food from BJs. In 2022, JRA served over 6,000 individuals of all backgrounds in more than 3,400 households.

== Services ==
JRA recipients are eligible for services if their household income is within 150% of the Federal Poverty Level and they live in JRA's service area.

JRA services include the following:

- A monthly supplemental box of Kosher pantry staples and fresh produce (from September through May)
- Donated household items, toiletries, period products, kids' apparel, diapers and adult incontinence supplies
- Holiday appropriate food items for the Jewish holidays of Rosh Hashanah, Hanukkah, Purim, and Passover

== JRA expansion locations ==
Various communities, inspired by JRA's work in the Greater Philadelphia region, have opened JRA programs in their locations including Chicago, Greenwich, Connecticut, Pittsburgh, MetroWest New Jersey, and South Jersey.
