= Joash =

Joash (Hebrew: יְהוֹאָשׁ, Yəhōʾāš) is a masculine given name of Hebrew origin, meaning "gift of YHWH". It may refer to:

== People ==
- Joash Gesse, (born 1986), Canadian Football League linebacker
- Joash Onyango (born 1993), Kenyan footballer
- Joash Woodrow (1927–2006), English artist

== Biblical figures ==
- Joash of Israel, King of Israel who supposedly reigned from 801–786 BC or 798–782 BC
- Joash of Judah, King of Judah who supposedly reigned from 837–800 BCE or 835–796 BCE
- Four minor biblical figures
