= Joint civil–military operations task force =

A joint civil–military operations task force, or JCMOTF, is a task organized military unit with the functional purpose of conducting civil–military operations. A JCMOTF generally contains civil affairs type forces with specialists in areas such as nation building, humanitarian assistance, public works and utilities, public safety and health, public education, governance and economics. A military commander may form a JCMOTF during war or disaster relief to stabilize and rebuild an area. A commander may also employ a JCMOTF during peace to perform humanitarian or nation assistance. A JCMOTF may also contain civilian governance, development or stabilization specialists.
