= JQ =

JQ or jq may refer to:

== People ==
- Joshua Quagmire (1953–2023), American cartoonist
- Jon Qwelane (1952–2020), South African journalist, broadcaster and diplomat

== Aviation ==
- Air Jamaica Express (former IATA airline designator JQ)
- Jetstar (IATA airline designator JQ)
- Fairchild JQ, a utility monoplane
- JQ, a military aircraft prefix code for China; see List of aircraft produced by China

== Other uses ==
- Jewel Quest, a tile-matching videogame series
- Jewish question, as used by the alt-right and neo-Nazis
- Johnston Atoll (FIPS PUB 10-4 territory code JQ)
- jq (programming language), a high-level programming language that serves as a query language for JSON

== See also ==
- JQS (disambiguation)
