= JK =

JK may refer to:

== People ==
- Jay Kay (Jason Luís Cheetham, born 1969), English musician and lead singer of Jamiroquai
- Jaykae (Janum Khan, born 1991), English rapper and actor
- JK-47 (Jacob Paulson, born 1991/1992), Indigenous Australian rapper and musician
- JK (rapper) or Tiger JK (Seo Jung-kwon, born 1974), South Korean-American rapper and record producer
- J.K. (singer) (Marta Simlat, born 1970), Polish model and singer
- Jason King (presenter) (born 1975), British radio and TV presenter, part of JK and Joel
- Jelena Karleuša (born 1978), or JK, Serbian singer
- Jesper Kyd (born 1972), or JK, Danish video game composer
- John McKay Jr. (John Kenneth McKay, born 1953), known as JK, American football player and attorney
- Jordan Katembula (born 1978), known professionally as JK, Zambian singer
- Joseph Kevin Bracken (1852–1904), known as J. K. Bracken, founder of the Gaelic Athletic Association
- Jiddu Krishnamurti (1895–1986), Indian philosopher, speaker and writer
- Juan Karlos Labajo (born 2001), Filipino singer and actor
- Jungkook (born 1997), or JK, South Korean singer
- Juscelino Kubitschek (1902–1976), or JK, president of Brazil 1956–1961
  - JK Building in Belo Horizonte, Brazil
  - JK Memorial in Brasilia, Brazil
- Jusuf Kalla, businessman and former vice-president of Indonesia
- J. K. Dobbins (J'Kaylin Dobbins, born 1998), known as JK, American football running back
- J. K. Ihalainen (born 1957), Finnish poet
- J. K. Rowling, pen name of Joanne Rowling (born 1965), British author, producer, and philanthropist
- J. K. Scott (John Kimball Scott III, born 1995), known as JK, American football punter
- J. K. Simmons (born 1955), American actor

== Businesses and organisations ==
- J. K. Organisation, an Indian industrial conglomerate
- JK Lasers, a British laser manufacturer
- J. K. College, in Purulia district, West Bengal, India
- JK Public School, in Humhama, Srinagar, Jammu and Kashmir, India
- Spanair, a Spanish airline, IATA airline code JK

== Other uses ==
- Jammu and Kashmir (disambiguation)
  - Jammu and Kashmir (union territory), a region administered by India as a union territory (ISO 3166-2 code)
- JK (TV series), a 2006 Brazilian series about Juscelino Kubitschek
- Jk antigen, or Kidd antigen system
- JK business, the practice of compensated dating with high school girls (joshi kōsei) in Japanese culture
- JK flip-flop, an electronic circuit
- Jan Kjellström International Festival of Orienteering, or JK, a British orienteering competition
- Järnkaminerna, or JK, supporter club of Djurgårdens IF
- Junior kindergarten: See Kindergarten § Canada
- JK, a Jeep Wrangler model 2007–2018

== See also ==
- Just Kidding (disambiguation)
