= Chopteeth =

US musical group

- Chopteeth playing at the Kennedy Center (2008).

Background information
- Origin: Washington, D.C., United States
- Genres: Afrofunk; Afrobeat; Funk; Highlife; Afropop
- Years active: 2004 – present
- Labels: Grisgris
- Members: Michael Shereikis, guitar and vocals Anna Mwalagho, vocals Robert Fox, bass Craig Considine, trombone Mark Gilbert, saxophones Justine Miller, trumpet and vocals Trevor Specht, saxophones and vocals Cheryl Terwilliger, trumpet Atta Addo, djembe & twinchin Mark Corrales, percussion David McDavitt, drums Jason Walker, drums and percussion Brian Simms, keyboards Jon Hoffschneider, keyboards Victor Crisen, guitar
- Website: www.chopteeth.com

Chopteeth is a Washington, D.C.–based afrofunk big band. Although rooted in Fela Kuti's Nigerian afrobeat, Chopteeth's music is an amalgam of Ghanaian highlife, Senegalese rumba, Jamaican ska, Mande griot music, 1970s West African funk, Ewe dance drum rhythms, Kenyan Taita afropop, soul-funk, and jazz. Chopteeth's writing and arrangements feature unique driving syncopations, and occasional odd meters. Chopteeth vocalists sing in eight different languages: English, Nigerian Pidgin, Swahili, Wolof, Mande, Twi, Taita, and French.

== History ==
Founded in 2004 by Robert Fox (bass), ethnomusicologist Michael Shereikis (guitar and lead vocals), Jon Hoffschneider (keyboards), and bata drummer Mark Corrales (percussion), Chopteeth quickly attracted a stable line-up of musicians including saxophonist Mark Gilbert (Gladys Knight & the Pips, The Four Tops, Cab Calloway, Don Cherry), trombonist Craig Constadine (Busta Rhymes), trumpeter Justine Miller, Romanian guitarist Victor Crisen, Kenyan vocalist/dancer Anna Mwalagho, and Ghanaian music teacher David McDavitt (drums). In 2008 Ghanaian drummer Atta Addo joined Chopteeth on percussion.

The name "Chopteeth" comes from a song by Fela Kuti called "J'ehin J'ehin". It refers to someone who eats his own teeth, a crazy person. Percussionist and former member Mark Corrales came up with that name for the band because he said they were insane to think they could sustain a large afrobeat band.

Chopteeth won several Wammies (Washington Area Music Awards) presented by the Washington Area Music Association (WAMA):

- 2007 Best World Music Group
- 2008 Best World Music Duo/Group
- 2008 Best World Music Recording
- 2008 Best Debut Recording
- 2008 Artist of the Year
- 2009 Artist of the Year
- 2010 World Music Group
- 2010 World Music Recording

== Band ==
- Michael Shereikis, guitar and vocals
- Robert Fox, bass
- Craig Considine, trombone
- Mark Gilbert, saxophones
- Justine Miller, trumpet and vocals
- Trevor Specht, saxophones and vocals
- Cheryl Terwilliger, trumpet
- Atta Addo, twinchin and djembe
- David McDavitt, percussion
- Brian Simms, keyboards
- Jason Walker, drums
- Victor Crisen, guitar
- Mark Corrales, percussion (former)

== Educational sites authored by Chopteeth ==
- The Afrofunk Forum Blog News, music reviews and commentary on Afrobeat and related music from Africa, The Caribbean and The Americas
- Fela Kuti Lyrics transcribed by Chopteeth's David McDavitt
- A List of Afrobeat Bands Active Worldwide

== Video ==
- Kennedy Center Millennium Stage Three Chopteeth concerts at the Kennedy Center in Washington D.C.

== Discography ==
=== Albums ===
- Struggle, 2008
- Chopteeth Live, 2010

== Recording collaborations ==
- Sierra Leone's Refugee All Stars
- Cheick Hamala Diabate (Malian griot, ngoni master, Grammy nominee)

== See also ==
- Tony Allen
