= Jedi Knight =

Jedi Knight may refer to:

- Jedi, an organization of monk-like warriors in the Star Wars universe
- Jedi census phenomenon
- Jedi Knights Trading Card Game
- Jedi Knights, a music project of Mark Pritchard and Tom Middleton
- "Jedi Night", an episode in the fourth season of Star Wars Rebels
- Star Wars: Jedi Knight, a video game series
