= J9 =

J9, J09, J 9 or J-9 may refer to:

== Military ==
- Chengdu J-9, a designation assigned to a 1975 Chinese interceptor aircraft that never progressed beyond initial studies
- HMS Cromarty (J09), a 1940 British Royal Navy Bangor-class minesweeper
- Junkers J 9, a factory designation for the 1917 German Junkers D.I fighter aircraft
- Seversky J9, a Swedish WW2 fighter plane

== Transport ==
- County Route J9 (California), a main route between the cities of Oakdale, Waterford, and Turlock
- GS&WR Class J9, a Great Southern and Western Railway steam locomotive
- Jazeera Airways, a Kuwaiti airline
- Johor State Route J9, a major road in Johor, Malaysia
- Peugeot J9, a fullsize van manufactured from 1981 to 2010

== Other uses ==
- J9 (album), a 2004 album by Jolin Tsai
- J9 Series, a trilogy of Japanese anime robot series
- Elongated pentagonal pyramid (J_{9}), a Johnson solid
- IBM J9, an implementation of Java
- S/2000 J 9, now called Taygete, a retrograde irregular satellite of Jupiter
- S/2001 J 9, now called Orthosie, a natural satellite of Jupiter
- S/2003 J 9, a retrograde irregular satellite of Jupiter

== See also ==
- 9J (disambiguation)
