= Joint Command and Staff College =

- Abu Dhabi

Site information
- Website: www.jcsc.milnet.ae

Location
- Location within United Arab Emirates
- Coordinates: 24.4574°N 54.397028°E

Garrison information
- Current commander: Major Gen./Ahmed Ali Homaid al Ali

The Joint Command and Staff College (JCSC) is one of the colleges of the UAE armed forces that specialize in teaching the art of war in general and the operational art in particular. The JCSC combines theory and practice as a basis for its instructional methodology and aims to develop leadership qualities in the students. The JCSC contributes to forming the concept of employment for the armed forces in joint operations and military operations in peacetime, such as peacekeeping and peace support operations.

== Historical background ==
On September 28, 1991, the UAE Federal Decree Law No. 9 was issued, founding the JCSC as the highest military college in the country, to handle the responsibility of preparing select officers to occupy command positions in the headquarters and units of the armed forces. On October 15, 1991, the Deputy Chief of Staff of the Armed Forces decided on the Statute of the JCSC.

== Inauguration ==
His Highness Sheikh Khalifa bin Zayed Al Nahyan, Crown Prince of Abu Dhabi and Deputy Supreme Commander of the Armed Forces inaugurated the JCSC on Monday, January 20, 1992. In 1994, the Chief of Staff of the UAE Armed Forces issued a decree turning all the courses held at the college from general command and staff courses to joint command and staff courses, effective from Course 8, and the curricula were modified to joint curricula to serve all services of the Armed Forces.

== College mission and objectives ==
- Qualifying officers to occupy command and staff positions in accordance with instructional curricula that keep up with military knowledge.
- Increasing and reinforcing the fields of national, international, and Islamic studies.
- Instilling research, analysis, and reasoning skills.
- Developing capabilities in planning, coordination and teamwork.
- Enriching the instructional process with meetings with higher civil and military leaders who have exceptional academic and military experience.

== Admission and study ==
Instruction in the JCSC is no longer limited to military sciences, exclusive to qualifying staff officers; it goes beyond that to holding courses in strategic planning. In addition, the curricula of the Joint Command and Staff courses were developed to meet the requirements of educational accreditation to enable participants to receive bachelor's degrees in Management and Military Sciences and master's degrees in Human Resource Management and through affiliation with Abu Dhabi University.

== Courses ==
The college regularly holds several courses based on directives issued by the GHQ of the Armed Forces:

=== Command and staff ===
To keep pace with the development of arming officers with accredited academic degrees and listing the Joint Command and Staff College side by side with the academic institutions accredited by the Ministry of Higher Education, the armed forces have developed the curricula of the Joint command and Staff Course to meet the requirements of academic accreditation in coordination with Abu Dhabi University. The curricula were reformed and the subjects redistributed on the basis of credit hours, taken from the sub-curricula of the former course; however, the new curricula were designed to maintain the mission of the college and present the military arts and sciences with the same sequence and intensity previously used. The curricula of the course were developed taking into consideration the directives of the Chief of Staff, the Head of the Higher College Council, the requirements of the Commands of the main forces, and notes and constructive feedback generated after the practical application of the curricle of previous courses. The advantages and disadvantages were considered and development and update areas were determined to meet the practical guidelines to qualifying staff officers capable of conducting command and staff functions and handling complex situations. The Joint Command and Staff Course aims at preparing officers to become military commanders and staff officers who possess experience and military training, awareness of legal, political, strategic, Islamic and historical knowledge, in addition to research and management skills to qualify them to perform command tasks assigned to them. Each course of study contributes significantly to the achievement of the program objectives that revolve around the following:

- Qualifying staff officers.
- Providing officers with command, planning and management proficiency.
- Empowering officers with skills necessary to conduct military operations.
- Qualifying officers to master military exercises.
- Qualifying officers to employ military weapons and equipment.
- Reinforcing tactical competency.
- Developing strategic communication skills.
- Reinforcing legal, political and strategic awareness.
- Learning scientific research principles and applications.
- Expanding participants’ Islamic and historical culture.

=== Joint Operations Course ===
This course aims at qualifying participants to function at the military strategic and operational levels as joint commanders, members of strategic planning groups and joint planning groups, joint task force commanders, or staff officers in joint commands. They must understand the outcomes of planning and functioning at the military strategic level needed for the Higher Council of Defense (military political advice) in order to achieve the following:

- Qualifying officers to occupy command positions or function in joint staff groups at various levels (joint command or task force command) by providing knowledge about Military Doctrine, Joint doctrine, the Joint Concept of the UAE, and Joint Operations Planning, in addition to newer publications from the Joint Operations Center.
- Developing the participants’ competencies to enable them to conduct joint operations planning and management processes at the military strategic and operational levels.
- Standardizing participants’ concepts of joint operations in the UAE.
- Developing participants’ skills of news analysis through analyzing national, regional, and international situations.

=== Strategic Planning Course ===
This course aims at preparing participants and enhancing their skills in forming and organizing joint operations teams capable of understanding the dimensions and requirements of national security and designing military political strategies, strategic planning mechanisms, decision making processes, leadership and strategic management, media, crisis planning and management, negotiations and scientific research. The course is designed to achieve the following objectives:

- Standardizing the participants’ understanding about military strategic planning and political strategic planning mechanisms of decision making in the framework of the concept of national security and the comprehensive capability of the country.
- Developing the participants’ skills of scientific research, comparative studies, assessing available alternatives for problem solving, based on principles and skills of reasoning and critical thinking for decision making.
- Developing participants’ understanding of crisis planning and management, negotiations and strategic management, and media to meet the requirements of the modern concept of leadership.
- Familiarizing participants with the principles, techniques, and types of command styles to enable them to learn from military history to meet the requirements in a way that relates the past to the future.
- Enhancing participants’ skills in determining higher objectives and end states to enable them to reach feasible work strategies with specific goals through time constrained programs

=== Master's degree in human resource management ===
The Human Resource Management\Faculty of Management is a specialized program that focuses on effective management of human resources in institutions. It provides participants with a valuable opportunity to study advanced scientific studies in managing human resources. It also provides participants with an opportunity to progress at both the personal and professional levels. Upon the completion of 33 credit hours, participants are awarded a master's degree. Upon completion of the program, graduates should be capable of:

- Applying various techniques in measuring the performance and effectiveness of institutions.
- Designing various strategies in the field of management and determining feasible employment methods that enhance the general outcomes of institutions.

Applying theoretical techniques, concepts, and principles related to institutional behavior.

=== Bachelor's degree in management and military sciences ===
In affiliation with Abu Dhabi University, the Ministry of Higher Education and Scientific Research accredited the BA program of Management and Military Sciences awarded to the graduates of the Joint Command and Staff College effective from Course 20. Furthermore, a special program was also accredited to qualify the graduates of former courses. A bachelor's degree will be awarded to graduates upon completion of 133 credit hours, at which time the graduates should be qualified to:

- Conduct strategic planning and effective command.
- Conduct analytical studies of the operational environment.
- Manage maritime, land and air operations.
- Conduct military research and studies.

== College curricula ==
- Courses

The college program is made up of 38 courses distributed among prerequisites of management, economics, military training, and command and staff.

- Syllabus

The course syllabi vary between academic, military, and academic-military, where directing staff employ educational technology, research seminars, national and international tours, exercises, and varied training drills, as shown in the syllabus of each course.
