= Joint Service Publication =

Type of documents by Ministry of Defence, United Kingdom

A Joint Service Publication (JSP) is a United Kingdom MoD related document.

A JSP is an authoritative set of rules or guidelines with defence-wide applicability or interest. Many are connected with safety or engineering and, as such, are considered important documents for those working in those areas.

== Responsible Authority ==
As a library of publications, JSPs are not the responsibility of any one person or organisation and over the years this has resulted in an unstructured group of publications many of which have become out of date.

== Future Development ==
Reviews have been carried out into the way that JSPs are published and managed with a view to streamlining and improving the current system which may lead to the following implementations under the banner of the JSP 600 series:

- Ownership for the various subject groups of JSPs
- A process whereby the need and content of new JSPs will be vetted and agreed by the relevant Owner and Sponsor
- A process for the regular review of JSPs to ensure their content remains current, and that obsolete JSPs are cancelled.
