= Journal of Applied Statistics =

- Discipline: Statistics
- Language: English
- Edited by: Jie Chen

Publication details
- Publisher: Taylor & Francis
- Frequency: 16/year
- Impact factor: 1.2 (2023)

Standard abbreviations
- ISO 4: J. Appl. Stat.

Indexing
- ISSN: 0266-4763 (print); 1360-0532 (web)
- OCLC no.: 85891558

Links
- Journal homepage; Online access; Online archive

The Journal of Applied Statistics or J.Appl.Stat. is a peer-reviewed scientific journal covering applied statistics that is published by Taylor & Francis. Its Journal Citation Reports impact factor was 1.2 in 2023.

== Creation ==
The journal was founded by Gopal Kanji in 1974 as the Bulletin in Applied Statistics (BIAS). Kanji remained as editor until the end of 2007.

== Quality rankings ==
In 2020, the Australian Mathematical Society listed J.Appl.Stat. with a ranking of B on a scale including A*, A, B and C. J.Appl.Stat. states that its Journal Citation Reports impact factor was 0.699 in 2017 and 1.2 in 2023.
