= Java Data Mining =

Java API

Java Data Mining (JDM) is a standard Java API for developing data mining applications and tools. JDM defines an object model and Java API for data mining objects and processes. JDM enables applications to integrate data mining technology for developing predictive analytics applications and tools. The JDM 1.0 standard was developed under the Java Community Process as JSR 73. In 2006, the JDM 2.0 specification was being developed under JSR 247, but has been withdrawn in 2011 without standardization.

Various data mining functions and techniques like statistical classification and association, regression analysis, data clustering, and attribute importance are covered by the 1.0 release of this standard.

It never received wide acceptance, and there is no known implementation.

== See also ==
- Predictive Model Markup Language

== Books ==
- Java Data Mining: Strategy, Standard, and Practice, Hornick, Marcadé, Venkayala, ISBN 0-12-370452-9
