= Just Kidding =

Just Kidding may refer to:

- Just Kidding (TV series), a Canadian children's series
- Just Kidding, a 1917 American comedy short film starring Billie Rhodes
- Just Kidding!, the UK title of Just Tricking, the first volume in the Just! book series by Andy Griffiths
- Just Kidding (Annie Bryant novel), the tenth book in the Beacon Street Girls young adult book series by Annie Bryant
- Just Kidding, a 1993 album by Treepeople
- Just Kidding, a comedy troupe featuring Jon Hein and Jon Glaser
- Just Kiddin, a British Electronic music production duo
