= J7 =

J7, J07, J 7 or J-7 may refer to:

- ATC code J07 Vaccines, a subgroup of the Anatomical Therapeutic Chemical Classification System
- Chengdu J-7, a 1966 People's Republic of China-built fighter jet
- County Route J7 (California)
- Demolition Plot J-7, a 1989 extended play from the American indie rock band Pavement
- HMAS J7, an Australian submarine
- HMS Beaumaris (J07), a 1939 British Royal Navy Bangor-class minesweeper
- Jaecoo J7, a compact SUV manufactured since 2023
- Johnson solid J7, the elongated triangular pyramid
- Junkers J 7, another designation for the German Junkers D.I aircraft
- LNER Class J7, a class of British steam locomotives
- Peugeot J7, a midsize van manufactured between 1965 and 1980
- Kyushu J7, a Japanese Kyushu-Watanabe prototype fighter aircraft
- Malaysia Federal Route J7, a major road in Johor, Malaysia
- Samsung Galaxy J7, an Android mid-range smartphone

and also:

- Centre-Avia IATA code
- ValuJet Airlines IATA code
- A brand of fruit juice produced by Wimm-Bill-Dann Foods in Russia

== See also ==
- 7J (disambiguation)
