= Catman (musician) =

French musician and electronic music producer

CATMAN
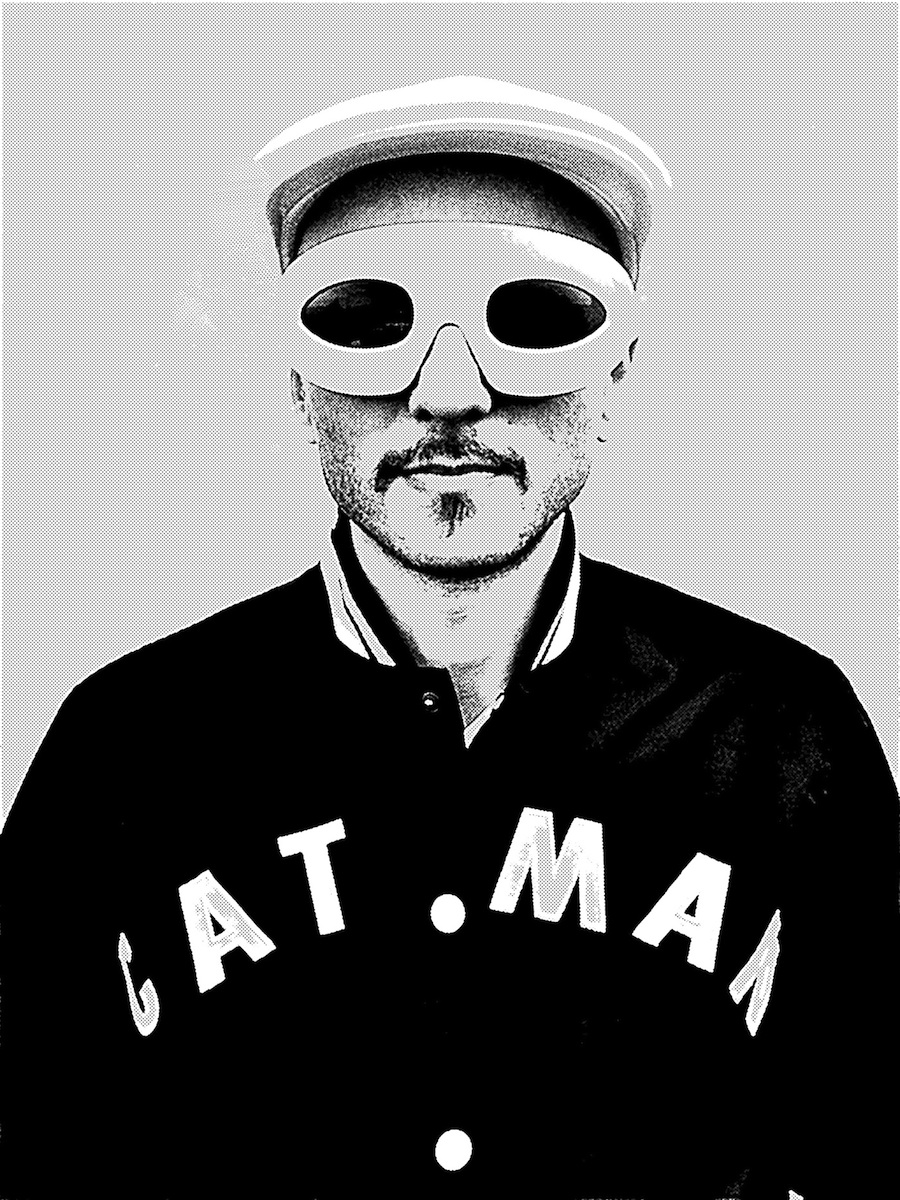

Background information
- Also known as: Catman
- Born: David Taieb; 1971 (age 54–55)
- Origin: France
- Genres: Electronic, jazz, avant-garde
- Occupations: Composer, producer
- Instruments: Turntables, electric bass
- Labels: Label Bleu, Warner, EMI
- Website: www.muchmuchmore.net

Catman (born David Taieb in 1971), son of Willy Lewis, famous French drummer, is a French musician and electronic music producer from Paris. He founded his own label Slackness Records in 2001, co-founded La Maison Magasin in 2008, and the record label end micro-publishing Much Much More based in Brussels, Belgium.

== Career ==
Familiar with turntables since the age of 14, DJ Shalom a.k.a. Catman has worked with Silmarils, Julien Lourau, Bumcello, Piers Faccini, M, Tryo, Java, Femi Kuti, Tony Allen, and Keziah Jones. He was also part of the group Olympic Gramofon. His first solo album, released in 2003, featured Piers Faccini, Sub-Z, Susie One, Vincent Ségalw and Seb Martel. He has also worked in dance and theater.

== Discography ==
=== Solo ===
- 2003 – DJ Shalom (Slackness Records/Bleu Electric)
- 2003 – DJ Shalom : Yes professor (Slackness Records/Bleu Electric)
- 2008 – DJ Shalom : Freaks (Slackness Records)
- 2008 – Criminal Beats (Volume 1) (Slackness Records)
- 2008 – Johnny Dollar : Jack's religion (Slackness Records)
- 2009 – DJ Shalom : Yayas (Slackness Records)
- 2009 – Urban Chill Out (Slackness Records)
- 2010 – DJ Shalom : I and I (Slackness Records)
- 2015 – Catman : Liberation Song (Much Much More)
- 2016 – Catman : Dog Eat Dog (Much Much More)

=== Duets ===
- 1998 – Mozesli (Source/EMI)
- 1998 – Mozesli : Sunshine (Source/EMI)
- 1999 – Mozesli : Love & slackness feat. Juan Rozoff (Source/EMI)
- 1999 – Mozesli : Minea feat. Juan Rozoff (Source/EMI)
- 1999 – Shalark : Shalamark (Briff)
- 2001 – Shalark : Don't (Slackness Records/Karat)
- 2001 – Shalark : Some of them don't (Slackness Records/Karat)
- 2007 – SH 747 : Brand new times (Slackness Records)
- 2008 – Burning : Burning away (Slackness Records)
- 2009 – Criminal Beats (Volume 2) DJ Shalom & Jeff Boudreaux : The Cesspool Sessions (Slackness Records)
- 2010 – Food for children : Art CD n°1

=== Trio ===
- 2014 – Struggle (Silène Editions)
- 2016 – Electric Pop Art Ensemble : Sent from my place (L'oreille électrique)

=== Sextet ===
- 1996 – Olympic Gramofon (Label Bleu)

=== Remixes et productions ===
- 1997 – Smoke City: Mr Gorgeous - Mozesli remix (Jive)
- 1997 – Sinclair : L’épreuve du temps - Mozesli remix (Source/EMI)
- 1998 – Teri Moise : Il sait - Mozesli remix (Source/EMI)
- 1998 – Neron - Mozesli remix
- 1998 – Julien Lourau : City boom boom - Dj Shalom remix (Warner Jazz)
- 1999 – Ark : De derrière les fagots - 2 original tracks by Shalark (Pias)
- 1999 – Ark : Belle lurette - 2 original tracks by Shalark (Pias)
- 1999 – Ark : Punkadelik - Shalark remix + 1 original track (Pias)
- 2000 – Mr Oizo : Last night Shalark killed Oizo - Shalark remix (F Com)
- 2001 – Ark : Le magicien d’os - Shalark remix (Pias)
- 2002 – More GDM : Silver Apples - Shalark remix (Tigersushi)
- 2004 – Seb Martel : Schizo song – Dj Shalom remix (Delabel)
- 2004 – -M- : Quand je vais chez L – Dj Shalom remix (Delabel)
- 2008 – Susie One : No shit (Slackness Records)
- 2010 – Susie One : No more reality (Slackness Records)
- 2012 – Katherina Ex et Fantazio : A sonic meeting (Fantaztic Records)
- 2013 – Fantazio : Catman Remix (Fantaztic Records)
- 2015 – Zob' : La vie presque belle

=== Featuring ===
- 1995 – Silmarils : Silmarils (Warner)
- 1995 – Aurèle Ricard : Think or thanks a lot (Agnès B)
- 1996 – Légitime processus
- 1996 – Julien Lourau : Vodoo dance (Label Bleu)
- 1998 – Julien Lourau : City Boom Boom (Warner Jazz)
- 1999 – Emmanuel Bex : Mauve
- 1999 – -M- : Je dis aime (Delabel)
- 2000 – Java : Hawaï (Sony)
- 2000 – Julien Lourau : Gambit (Warner Jazz)
- 2001 – -M- : Le tour de -M- (Delabel)
- 2002 – Charlélie Couture : 109
- 2002 – -M- : Qui de nous deux (Delabel)
- 2002 – Femi Kuti : Red Hot + Riot : The Music and Spirit of Fela Kuti
- 2003 – Minino Garay
- 2004 – -M- : Live Au Spectrum (Delabel)
- 2005 – -M- : En tête à tête (Delabel)
- 2006 – Oshen : Je ne suis pas celle (V2)
- 2008 – Keziah Jones : In the name of love : Africa celebrates U2
- 2012 – Tryo : Ladilafé
- 2013 – Fantazio & Jean-François Vrod : Recommandé

== Bibliography ==
- 2015 – K : Hommage à Elsa Cayat (Much Much More)
- 2015 – Manifeste Much Much More

== Composition for theater and dance ==
- 2001 : Berenice mis en scène par Frederic Fisbach et Bernardo Montet (Théâtre de la Bastille)
- 2006 : Quartett avec Michael Galasso, mis en scène par Bob Wilson (Théâtre de l'Odéon)
- 2009 : Shake that devil ! chorégraphié par Alban Richard (Forum du Blanc Mesnil)
- 2011 : Dans le collimateur de Fantazio (TAP Scène nationale de Poitiers)
- 2012 : L'été en apesanteur avec Kitsou Dubois et Fantazio (Théâtre de la Cité Internationale)
- 2013 : Struggle avec Sebastien Martel & Dorothée Munyaneza (Théâtre des Bouffes du Nord)

== Ciné-concerts ==
- 2009 : Auditorium du Louvre (Paris)
- 2009 : Festival Les Nuits Secrètes
- 2009 : Festival Mediarte (Monterrey-Mexique)

== Résidences ==
- 2001 : Shalark - L'Aeronef (Lille)
- 2004 : Ateliers imaginaires - La Vapeur (Dijon)
- 2004 : DJ Shalom - La Maroquinerie (Paris)
- 2005 : DJ Shalom & Susie One - La ferme du buisson
- 2005 : DJ Shalom - La Vapeur (Dijon)
- 2005 : DJ Shalom - Jazz à la Villette (Paris)
- 2008 : Urban Chill Out - Festival Nuits Secrètes
- 2009 : DJ Shalom & Susie One - Festival Factory (Paris)
- 2009 : Minimal Western - Festival Les Nuits Secrètes
- 2010 : DJ Shalom vs Black Sifichi - Bibliothèque R. Desnos (Montreuil)
- 2010 : DJ Shalom, Sylvain Kassap & Susie One - Théatre Berthelot / Maison Populaire (Montreuil)

== Tour as a sideman ==
- 1995 : Silmarils (Europe Tour)
- 1999 : Julien Lourau Groove Gang : Gambit (National & International Tour)
- 1999 / 2000 : Le Tour de -M- (National & International Tour)
- 2003 / 2004 : -M- En tête à tête (National & International Tour)
- 2013 : Tryo : Ladilafé Tour

== Master Class / Workshops ==
- Philarmonie de Paris
- La Cité de la Musique
- Festival Factory
- La Batie Festival de Genève
- AJMI
- CIAM
- CMA
- Festival Nuits Secrètes
- Bougez Rock
- Zicamontreuil
- Ville de Montreuil
- Ville de Bailleul
- La Vapeur
