= Gail Ann Dorsey =

American singer and bassist (born 1962)

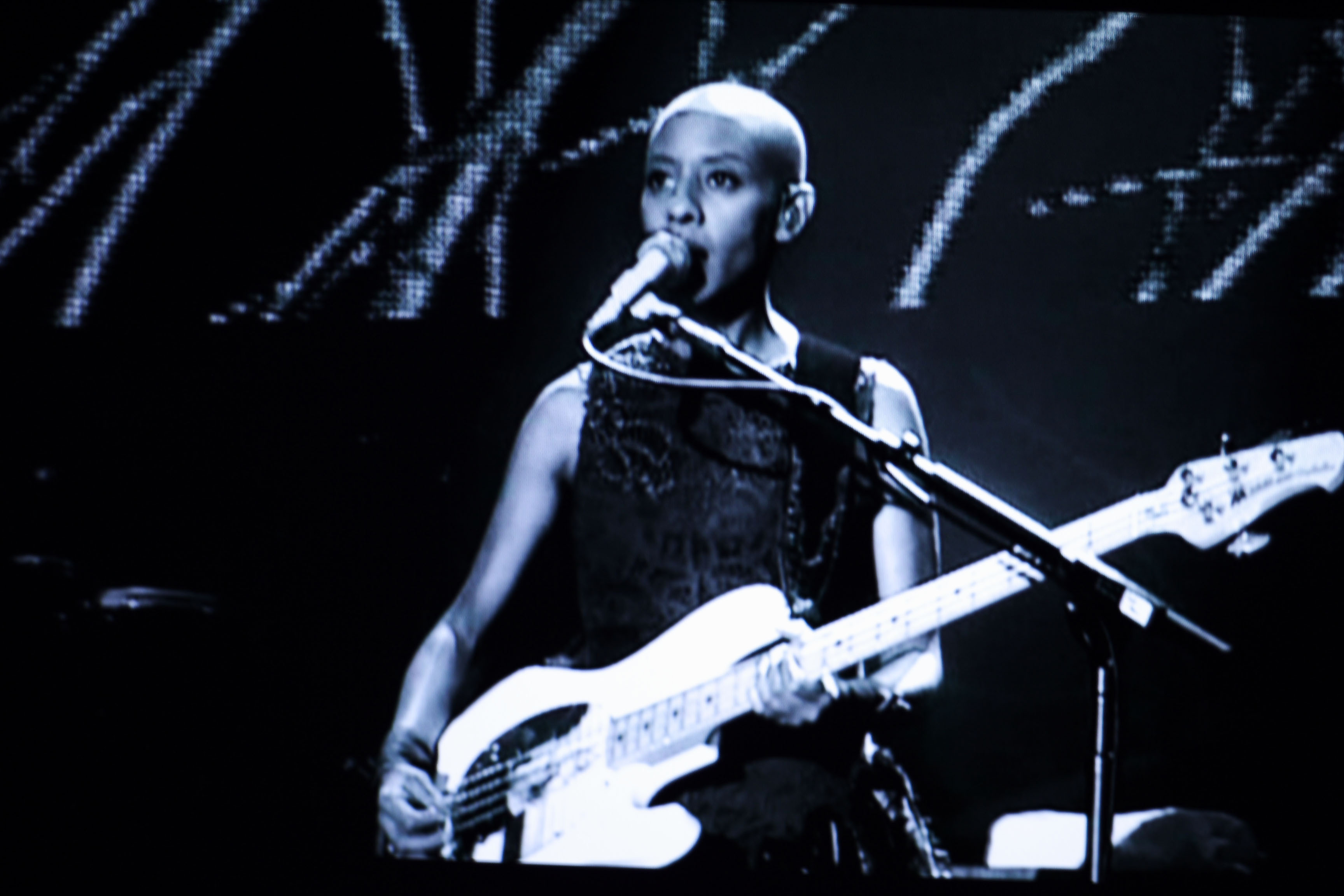
- Dorsey in 2004

Background information
- Born: November 20, 1962 (age 63); Philadelphia, Pennsylvania, U.S.
- Genres: Alternative rock; R&B; soul; rock; funk; pop rock
- Occupations: Musician; songwriter
- Instruments: Vocals; bass guitar
- Years active: 1985–present
- Labels: Sire; Island; Sad Bunny; UFO Music
- Website: gailanndorsey.com

Gail Ann Dorsey (born November 20, 1962) is an American musician. With a long career as a session musician mainly on bass guitar, she performed regularly in David Bowie's band, from 1995 to Bowie's last tour in 2004.

Aside from playing bass, she sang lead vocals on live versions of "Under Pressure" (taking the part originally sung by Queen frontman Freddie Mercury) and dueted with Bowie on other songs, including "The London Boys", "Aladdin Sane (1913–1938–197?)", "I Dig Everything", accompanying Bowie on clarinet, and a cover of Laurie Anderson's "O Superman".

From 1993 to 1996, Dorsey also recorded and toured with Tears for Fears, and collaborated on songwriting with the band. She appeared in several of the band's promo videos throughout this period.

Her diverse range of work includes performances and recordings with The National, Lenny Kravitz, Bryan Ferry, Boy George, the Indigo Girls, Khaled, Jane Siberry, The The, Skin, Gwen Stefani, Charlie Watts, Seal, Gang of Four, Susan Werner, Ani DiFranco and Dar Williams.

In addition, Dorsey has released three solo albums: The Corporate World (1988), Rude Blue (1992), and I Used To Be... (2003).

== Early life ==
Dorsey grew up in the 1970s in West Philadelphia. She played guitar from the age of nine and cites Mark Farner of Grand Funk Railroad, Terry Kath of Chicago, Jimi Hendrix, and Nancy Wilson of Heart as early influences. She acquired a bass guitar shortly after her 14th birthday but did not consider herself a bass player until she was 20. She also wrote feature-length screenplays to accompany some of her musical compositions.

Dorsey attended the California Institute of the Arts in the School of Film and Video. Her screenplays and short Super 8 films earned her a full scholarship. Dorsey was the only woman in her freshman class and the youngest woman to be admitted to the Live Action department up to that point. After completing three semesters she felt unsuited for the film industry and once again turned to a career in music.

== Career ==
At the age of 22, Dorsey moved to London, England, to pursue her musical career, where she was in a musical collaboration/band 20To with keyboard player/composer Pete Stern. Their first demos were engineered and produced by Paul "Doc" Stewart at Village Way Studio in London. Stewart was responsible for their introduction to CBS Records, which led to Dorsey's first recording deal. She also composed the music for the Theatre of Black Women play Chiaroscuro in 1985, and was in the band for the show. She then established herself through collaborations with artists such as Boy George, Anne Pigalle, and Donny Osmond. Dorsey's first high-profile job was as a guest vocalist in the original line up of The Charlie Watts Big Band and its 1985 premiere at London's famous West End jazz club, Ronnie Scott's. An important point in Dorsey's solo career was her appearance on The Tube, a weekly music television hosted by Jools Holland and Paula Yates. She sang on the 1986 world jazz album The Song of Many Tongues by Grand Union Orchestra, written by Tony Haynes.

In December 1987, Dorsey signed with Warner Music Group and in 1988 released her first solo album, The Corporate World. The album was produced by bassist Nathan East of the jazz quartet Fourplay and included appearances by artists such as Eric Clapton. It received a five-star review and was voted one of the Top 50 Albums of the Year by London's Q magazine. She moved to Island Records in 1991, signed by founder Chris Blackwell. In 1992, she released her second solo album entitled Rude Blue, which featured trumpeter Mark Pender and trombonist Richie "La Bamba" (from Conan O'Brien's house band), Carla Azar on drums (from Wendy & Lisa), Carol Steele on percussion, and the famous James Brown horn section of Maceo Parker, Fred Wesley, and Alfred "Pee Wee" Ellis. After almost 12 years in England, Dorsey relocated to the artist community of Woodstock in upstate New York in 1994.

When her relationship with Island became strained, Dorsey began to concentrate on session work and in 1995 was recruited for David Bowie's Outside Tour. Throughout the remainder of the 1990s and into the 21st century she performed and recorded with artists such as Gang of Four, Louise Goffin, world music stars Rachid Taha, Faudel, and Khaled (on their live album 1, 2, 3 Soleils), Sophie B. Hawkins, Tears For Fears, The The, The Indigo Girls, Canadian artist Jane Siberry, Jeffrey Gaines, Italian blues man Zucchero, Dar Williams, Catie Curtis, Toshi Reagon, Joan Osborne, The B-52s, and Michael Hutchence of INXS.

Dorsey is perhaps best known for her contribution to the David Bowie band. After the Outside Tour she provided vocals and bass for Earthling (1997), Heathen (2002), Reality (2003) and The Next Day (2013). She recorded "Planet of Dreams", a duet with Bowie on the 1997 EMI UK benefit CD release, Long Live Tibet, as well as several other live recordings and videos. She was on board for the last six tours and performed with Bowie at "The Concert For New York" at Madison Square Garden. About a decade after Rude Blue, Dorsey released her third solo album in 2003. The album entitled I Used To Be is a collection of previously unreleased material spanning the past 18 years of Dorsey's songwriting archives. She wrote all songs herself with the exception of a few collaborators, namely Roland Orzabal and singer-songwriter Kristen Hall. I Used To Be was produced by Dorsey and engineer/producer Brandon Mason, with long-time friend and fellow bassist Sara Lee as executive producer. In 2017, Dorsey joined the Celebrating David Bowie tour from January 2, 2017, to February 2, 2017, alongside other musicians and collaborators of David Bowie.

Since 2022, she collaborate with Matthieu Chedid on album (Rêvalité) and on stage.

In 2026 she collaborated with Aaron and Bryce Dessner at the PEOPLE festival 2026 where she performed cover songs for The National and supported indie musicians performing sets over two days.

== Style and influences ==
Dorsey's musical style has a broad span and incorporates rock, funk, country, and pop influences. She describes her current sound as a present-day version of the AM/FM radio tunes that left a mark on her music such as The Fifth Dimension, Olivia Newton-John, Bread and Heart. When asked to describe her sound in one word she says: "Black-arach...but that's maybe how I feel most days. Sometimes you can never tell what vehicle is required to deliver the message until it tells you. I don't want to limit myself to anything. I just want to maintain honesty and substance in the work. That is my responsibility to the music and the audience." Dorsey uses a Music Man Stingray and a Fender Jazz Bass primarily for touring and recording.

In December 2021, Bass Player magazine gave Dorsey a Lifetime Achievement Award.

== Discography ==
=== Solo ===
- 1988: The Corporate World (Sire Records)
- 1992: Rude Blue (Island Records)
- 2004: I Used to Be (Sad Bunny Records)

=== Gang of Four ===
- 1991: Mall – Gail Ann: bass, backing vocals
- 2015: What Happens Next – Gail Ann: vocals on "First World Citizen"

=== The The ===
- 1995: Hanky Panky – Gail Ann: bass

=== Tears for Fears ===
- 1993: Elemental – Gail Ann: bass player for "Elemental" and participation in their "Elemental Tour" (1993–95)
- 1995: Raoul and the Kings of Spain – Gail Ann: bass and participation in the writing of "Queen of Compromise"

=== David Bowie ===
Studio albums

- 1997: Earthling – Gail Ann: bass, backing vocals
- 2003: Reality – Gail Ann: backing vocals
- 2013: The Next Day – Gail Ann shares bassist position with Tony Levin, being present on bass on 8 songs and on backing vocals on 7

Live albums

- 2000: LiveAndWell.com – Gail Ann: bass, keyboards, backing vocals
- 2000: Bowie at the Beeb – Gail Ann: bass, guitars, backing vocals on CD 3
- 2009: VH1 Storytellers – Gail Ann: bass, backing vocals
- 2010: A Reality Tour – Gail Ann: bass, backing vocals
- 2018: Glastonbury 2000 – Gail Ann: bass, backing vocals

Compilation

- 2022: Toy – Gail Ann: bass, clarinet, backing vocals

EP

- 2020: Is It Any Wonder? - David Bowie EP recorded during the Earthling album sessions; Gail Ann is present on 5 of the 6 titles of the EP

=== Rachid Taha/Khaled/Faudel ===
- 1999: 1,2,3 Suns – Gail Ann: bass, backing vocals; Steve Hillage of the band Gong produced the album and played guitar

=== Collaborations ===
2023: Album Rêvalité by French singer/songwriter Matthieu Chedid – Gail Ann: chorus and bass; vocals on digitally released tracks "Space Oddity" and "Life on Mars".

1990: Bloodletting by Concrete Blonde – Gail Ann: bass on "Tomorrow, Wendy"
