= Lamomali =

French-Malian musical collective

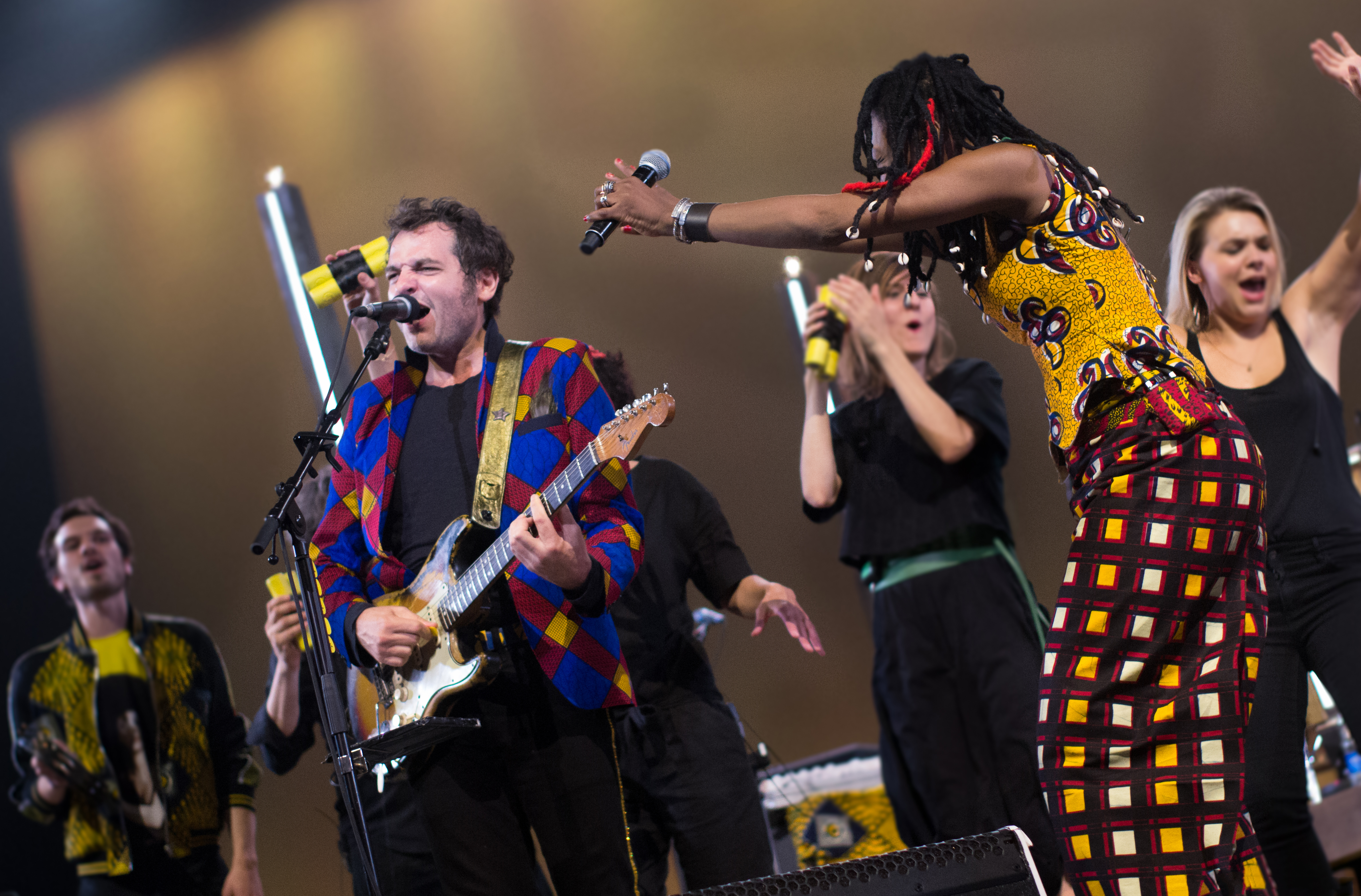
- Lamomali performing in 2017

Background information
- Origin: France; Mali
- Genres: World music; African music; pop; rock
- Years active: 2015–present
- Labels: Wagram
- Members: Matthieu Chedid; Fatoumata Diawara; Sidiki Diabaté; Mamadou Sidiki Diabaté
- Past members: Toumani Diabaté
- Website: labo-m.net

Lamomali is a collective of musicians, mostly of French and Malian origin, formed primarily at the initiative of Matthieu Chedid, aka -M-, in 2015. The group blends African, world, rock, and pop music. Their self-titled, debut album was released in 2017 and was followed by Totem in 2025.

== History ==
Following a trip to Mali in 2006, where he met the kora player Toumani Diabaté and his son Sidiki, French musician Matthieu Chedid, also known as -M-, decided to form a musical collective with the duo that also included singer-songwriter Fatoumata Diawara. They named it Lamomali, which means "the soul of Mali" (l'âme au Mali), in French. Chedid thus fulfilled a passion he had for the Western African nation, and in 2015, the ensemble released its debut, self-titled album. The record includes contributions from Oxmo Puccino; Ibrahim Maalouf; Philippe Jaroussky; Seu Jorge; Nekfeu; Mamani Keïta; Chedid's father, Louis; and Youssou N'Dour; among others. The group subsequently went on tour, performing in several cities in France and Belgium. This resulted in a live album, Lamomali Airlines, released in 2017. Lamomali won in the World Music Album category at the 2018 Victoires de la Musique ceremony.

Toumani Diabaté died in 2024, during the recording of Lamomali's second studio album, Totem, which was released in 2025. The record was dedicated to him as well as to Philippe Zdar, who had mixed Lamomali and who died in 2019. It includes contributions from such artists as Amadou & Mariam, Oxmo Puccino, Philippe Jaroussky, and Yamê. The group subsequently embarked on a tour, which culminated in the live album Totem Live later that year. Also in 2025, Totem was re-released as Lamomali je t'aime, with six new tracks.

== Band members ==
Current

- Matthieu Chedid – vocals, guitar, other instruments
- Fatoumata Diawara – vocals
- Sidiki Diabaté – kora, vocals
- Mamadou Sidiki Diabaté – kora

Past

- Toumani Diabaté – kora (died 2024)

== Discography ==
Studio albums

- Lamomali (2017)
- Totem (2025) – reissued as Lamomali je t'aime, also in 2025

Live albums

- Lamomali Airlines (2017)
- Totem Live (2025)
