= Sidiki Diabaté =

Malian musician (born 1992)

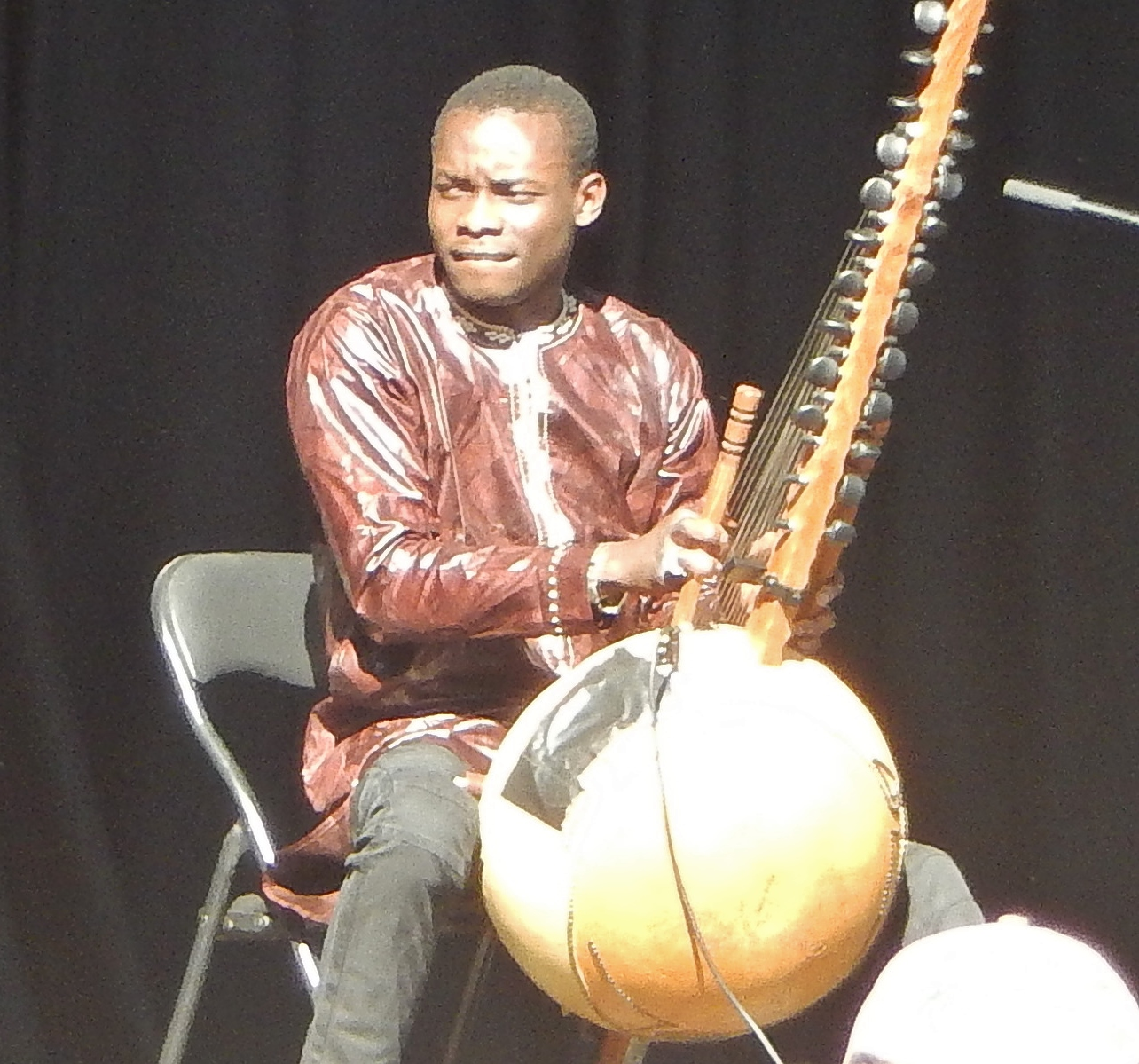
- Diabaté in 2016

Background information
- Born: 1992 (age 33–34); Bamako, Mali
- Member of: Lamomali

Sidiki Diabaté is a Malian kora player, singer, and music producer born in 1992 in Bamako. He is the son of kora player Toumani Diabaté and grandson of his namesake, Sidiki Diabaté. Diabaté belongs to the 77th generation of musicians in a long family tradition of griots, his family being primarily kora players. His father's cousin Sona Jobarteh is the first female kora player to come from a griot family. His uncle Mamadou Sidiki Diabaté is also a kora player. Since 2015, he has been a member of the musical collective Lamomali, led by Matthieu Chedid.

Diabaté was arrested on 24 September 2020 on the count of assault of an ex-girlfriend.

== Discography ==
- Toumani & Sidiki, with Toumani Diabaté (2014)
- Diabateba Music, Vol. 1 (2016)
- Lamomali, with -M- (2017)
- Béni (2019)
- Kora Lover (2024)
