= Tanagra (disambiguation) =

Tanagra is a municipality in central Greece.

- Tanagra figurine
- Tanagra (Gérôme sculpture)
- Bacchius of Tanagra
- Corinna of Tanagra
- Tanagra (mythology)

Tanagra may also refer to:

- Tanagra, a mythical location in "Darmok", an episode of Star Trek: The Next Generation
- "Tanagra", a song by Matthieu Chedid from Mister Mystère
- Tanagra (machine learning), an open source data mining software for academic and research purposes
- Tanagra, an older synonym for Tangara (genus), a genus of birds
- Tanagra expositata, the white-tipped black or snowbush spanworm, a moth
- Tanagra Town, a location in Fallout 76

== See also ==
- Tanager, a bird family
