= Le Baptême (album) =

Studio album by M
- Released: 1998
- Recorded: 1997
- Genre: Rock
- Label: Delabel, EMI Music France

M chronology
Le Baptême (1998)	Je dis aime (1999)

Professional ratings
Review scores
Source	Rating
AllMusic	3.5/5 stars

Le Baptême is the first studio album by French rock musician M. It was recorded in 1997 and issued in 1998. The alter ego of Matthieu Chedid, the character M had come to prominence as a supporting act opening for the then chart-topping French folk rock band Louise Attaque.

== Track listing ==
1. "La Fleur"
2. "Le Baptême"
3. "L'Amour ma thématique"
4. "Nostalgic du cool"
5. "Manque de Q"
6. "Je suis une cigarette"
7. "La Mort de l'âme"
8. "Pick pocket"
9. "Les Acariens"
10. "Le Rose pourpre du cœur"
11. "Coup de vent"
12. "Le temps mue"
13. "Matchistador"
14. "Souviens-toi"
15. "Souvenir du futur"
16. "Machistador" (extended)
17. "Céline attendue"
