= Bolombatto =

West African traditional stringed instrument

The bolombatto is a traditional stringed instrument that features in the music of West Africa. It consists of four strings, stretched over a gourd, which serves as a resonator. The strings each have a different thickness. The thickness of it determines how low the sound will be. For example, a string that is really thick has a low sound, while a thin string has a high-pitched sound. In addition, the instrument also has a tin rattle attached to its body, which the musician plays by striking the strings and gourd simultaneously, adding an element of percussion to the music. In this way, it is similar to the sinding.

The bolombatto was originally played by shepherds, who used the combined sounds of the strings and percussion to frighten away wild animals.

Malian musician Toumani Diabaté once led an orchestra that played a mix of traditional instruments, including the kora, djembe, balafon, and bolombatto, as well as modern ones such as the guitar and electronic keyboard.
