= Rêvalité =

Studio album by M
- Released: 3 June 2022
- Length: 40:36
- Label: Labo M; 3ème Bureau; Wagram Music

M chronology
Lettre infinie (2019)	Rêvalité (2022)

Rêvalité is the seventh studio album by M, released on 3 June 2022.

Bassist Gail Ann Dorsey, best known for her collaboration with David Bowie, plays and provides backing vocals on the album. She also participated in the accompanying tour.

The album was certified gold for selling 50,000 copies.

== Track listing ==
1. "Rêvalité" – 2:33
2. "Dans ta radio" – 3:02
3. "Mégalo" – 2:45
4. "Mogodo" – 3:29
5. "Dans le living" – 2:23
6. "Nombril" – 2:36
7. "Petit homme" – 2:46
8. "Fellini" – 3:21
9. "Une étoile qui danse" – 3:43
10. "Ce jour‐là" – 3:58
11. "Mais tu sais" – 3:49
12. "Home" – 3:11
13. "La Langue des oiseaux" – 3:00

Total: 40:36

== Charts ==
Chart performance for Rêvalité
Chart (2022)	Peak position
Belgian Albums (Ultratop Wallonia)	9
French Albums (SNEP)	2
Swiss Albums (Schweizer Hitparade)	27
