= Lettre infinie =

Studio album by M
- Released: 25 January 2019
- Length: 43:30
- Label: Labo M; 3ème Bureau; Wagram Music

M chronology
Îl (2012)	Lettre infinie (2019)	Rêvalité (2022)

Lettre infinie is the sixth studio album by M, released on 25 January 2019.

It follows the album Îl, which was released in 2012. Two singles were released ahead of the album: "Superchérie" on 13 December 2018, and "Lettre infinie" on 14 January 2019.

The tracklist was revealed on 24 November 2018, and the album was released on 25 January 2019. The artwork features an alternating black and white interlocking pattern of the letter "M". At the bottom center is a portrait of the singer wearing a golden wig.

The track "Superchérie" was co-written with musician Thomas Bangalter, a member of the duo Daft Punk. The track "L'Alchimiste" was written by Brigitte Fontaine. Matthieu Chedid's daughter, Billie, contributed her voice to eight tracks on the album, mostly for background vocals. The final track of the album is dedicated to her. "L'Autre Paradis" is a song dedicated to Raphaël Hamburger, a friend of the singer and the son of Michel Berger and France Gall, to whom the song pays tribute. The title is a nod to Berger's song "Le Paradis blanc".

== Track listing ==
1. "Lettre infinie" – 3:09
2. "Superchérie" – 3:43
3. "Massaï" – 3:46
4. "Logique est ton écho" – 3:01
5. "Grand Petit Con" – 3:26
6. "L.O.Ï.C.A." – 2:58
7. "Adieu mon amour" – 4:42
8. "L'Alchimiste" – 2:48
9. "Thérapie" – 2:59
10. "Une seule corde" – 2:31
11. "Si près si..." – 3:27
12. "L'Autre Paradis" – 3:50
13. "Billie" – 3:10

== Personnel ==
- Matthieu Chedid – vocals, guitar, piano, synthesizer, bass, Rhodes, Wurlitzer, acoustic guitar, backing vocals
- Billie Chedid – vocals, backing vocals
- Thomas Bangalter – synthesizer, backing vocals
- Cyril Atef – drums, n'kul
- Vincent Ségal – cello
- Brad Thomas Ackley – guitar, bass, synthesizer, sampler, space piano
- Pierre Juarez – drums, synthesizer, TR-808
- Zdar – hi-hat, shaker
- Jean-Pierre Janiaud – backing vocals
- Hubert Blanc-Francard – synthesizer
- Michel Portal – clarinet
- Pierre Boscheron – sampler, synthesizer, "mosquito organ"

== Charts ==
Chart performance for Lettre infinie
Chart (2019)	Peak position
Belgian Albums (Ultratop Wallonia)	7
French Albums (SNEP)	1
Swiss Albums (Schweizer Hitparade)	11
