= Label Bleu =

French record label

Label Bleu is a French jazz record label founded by Michel Orier.

Orier established the label in the mid-1980s in Amiens and soon after took over directorship of Amiens's cultural center, where he was able to build a recording studio. Label Bleu has concentrated on releasing jazz; in 1991, a sublabel imprint, Indigo, was founded to release world music titles.

== Roster ==
- Abraham Inc.
- Acoustic Ladyland
- Chava Alberstein
- Antonio Agri
- Claude Barthélemy
- Stefano di Battista
- Michel Benita
- Bojan Z
- Stefano Bollani
- Safy Boutella
- Barbara Casini
- Catman
- Steve Coleman
- François Couturier
- D'Gary
- DJ Shalom
- Marc Ducret
- Elite Swingsters
- Piers Faccini
- Glenn Ferris
- Paolo Fresu
- Richard Galliano
- General Elektriks
- Inara George
- Regis Gizavo
- Bunky Green
- Andre Hodeir
- Daniel Humair
- Jaojoby
- François Jeanneau
- Wendo Kolosoy
- The Klezmatics
- Lee Konitz
- David Krakauer
- Joachim Kühn
- Eric Legnini
- Dave Liebman
- David Linx
- Julien Lourau
- Joe Lovano
- Gary Lucas
- Mahotella Queens
- Rita Marcotulli
- Carlos Maza
- Lapiro de Mbanga
- Totó la Momposina
- Juan Jose Mosalini
- Oliver Mtukudzi
- Anne-Marie Nzie
- Orchestre National de Jazz
- Jean-Marc Padovani
- Michel Portal
- Rail Band
- Enrico Rava
- Wolfgang Reisinger
- Aldo Romano
- George Russell
- Louis Sclavis
- Vincent Segal
- Andy Sheppard
- Ballake Sissoko
- Socalled
- Gianmaria Testa
- Henri Texier
- Pietro Tonolo
- Djelimady Tounkara
- Boubacar Traoré
- Rokia Traoré
- Diederik Wissels
