= Andrée Chedid =

Egyptian-French writer (1920–2011)

- Born: 20 March 1920; Cairo, Egypt
- Died: 6 February 2011 (aged 90); Paris, France
- Resting place: Montparnasse Cemetery
- Occupations: Poet, novelist
- Children: Louis Chedid
- Relatives: Matthieu Chedid (grandson)
- Writing career
- Language: French
- Notable awards: Prix Mallarmé; Prix Goncourt de la Nouvelle; Prix Goncourt de la Poésie

Andrée Chedid (Arabic: أندريه شديد) (20 March 1920 – 6 February 2011), born Andrée Saab Khoury, was an Egyptian-French poet and novelist of Lebanese and Syrian descent. She is the recipient of numerous literary awards and was made a Grand Officer of the French Legion of Honour in 2009.

== Life ==
Chedid was born in Cairo, Egypt, on 20 March 1920 to a Lebanese and Syrian Christian family. She was the daughter of Selim Saab, a Maronite Christian born in Baabda, Lebanon; and Alice Khoury, who was from Damascus, Syria.

When she was 10 years old, she was sent to a boarding school, where she learned English and French. At 14, she left for Europe. She then returned to Cairo to go to the American University. Her dream was to become a dancer.

When she was 22, she married Louis Selim Chedid, a Lebanese physician from a Maronite bourgeois family in Cairo and former research director at the National Center for Scientific Research, honorary professor of the Institute Pasteur and author of several books such as The heart remains and Babel which he wrote with his wife Andree.

Both her son Louis Chedid and her grandson Matthieu Chedid, also known as -M-, are popular pop and rock singers in France. She contributed song lyrics to her grandson including that of Bonoboo on the 1999 album Je dis aime. Her granddaughter Émilie Chedid (born 1970) is a French director, Joseph Chedid (born 1986), also known by his stage name Selim, is a French singer and Anna Chedid (born 1987), also known by her stage name Nach, is also a French singer.

== Literary work ==
Andrée Chedid published her first collection of poems On the Trails of my Fancy in 1943 in Cairo. She settled in Paris with her husband in 1946 and began writing there. In addition to numerous poems and novels, she also wrote plays and children's books mainly published by the publisher Groupe Flammarion. Her poetry books were partly illustrated by the Luxembourg painter Roger Bertemes.

In 1972, Chedid received the Prix de l'Aigle d'or for poetry followed by numerous other literary awards. For her books Fraternité de la parole and Cérémonial de la violence in 1976 she was awarded the Prix Mallarmé.

Her best-known work is the novel L'Autre which has been translated into many languages and tells of the rescue from an earthquake spilled by an ancient Egyptian. It was made into a movie in 1991 by Bernard Giraudeau under the title L'Autre.

Andrée Chedid was also awarded the Grand Prize of the Société des Auteurs et Compositeurs Dramatiques, the Grand Prize of the Société des auteurs, compositeurs et éditeurs de musique (SACEM) in 1999 and the Prix Goncourt of poetry.

Chedid has written twenty-three volumes of poetry, eighteen novels, more than a hundred short stories, eight plays and nine children's books.

== Legacy ==
In an appraisal, French President Nicolas Sarkozy called her part of a "generation of cosmopolitan intellectuals who chose France as their new home after the war, helping the country to a literary renaissance".

Her work questions the human condition and what links the individual to the world. Her writing seeks to evoke the Orient, but she focuses more on denouncing the civil war that destroys Lebanon. She lived in France from 1946 until her death. Because of this diverse background, her work is truly multicultural. Her first book was written in English: On the Trails of my Fancy. She has commented about her work that it is an eternal quest for humanity.

She died on 6 February 2011 in Paris at the age of 90.

In 2012, a public library was named for her, in Paris.

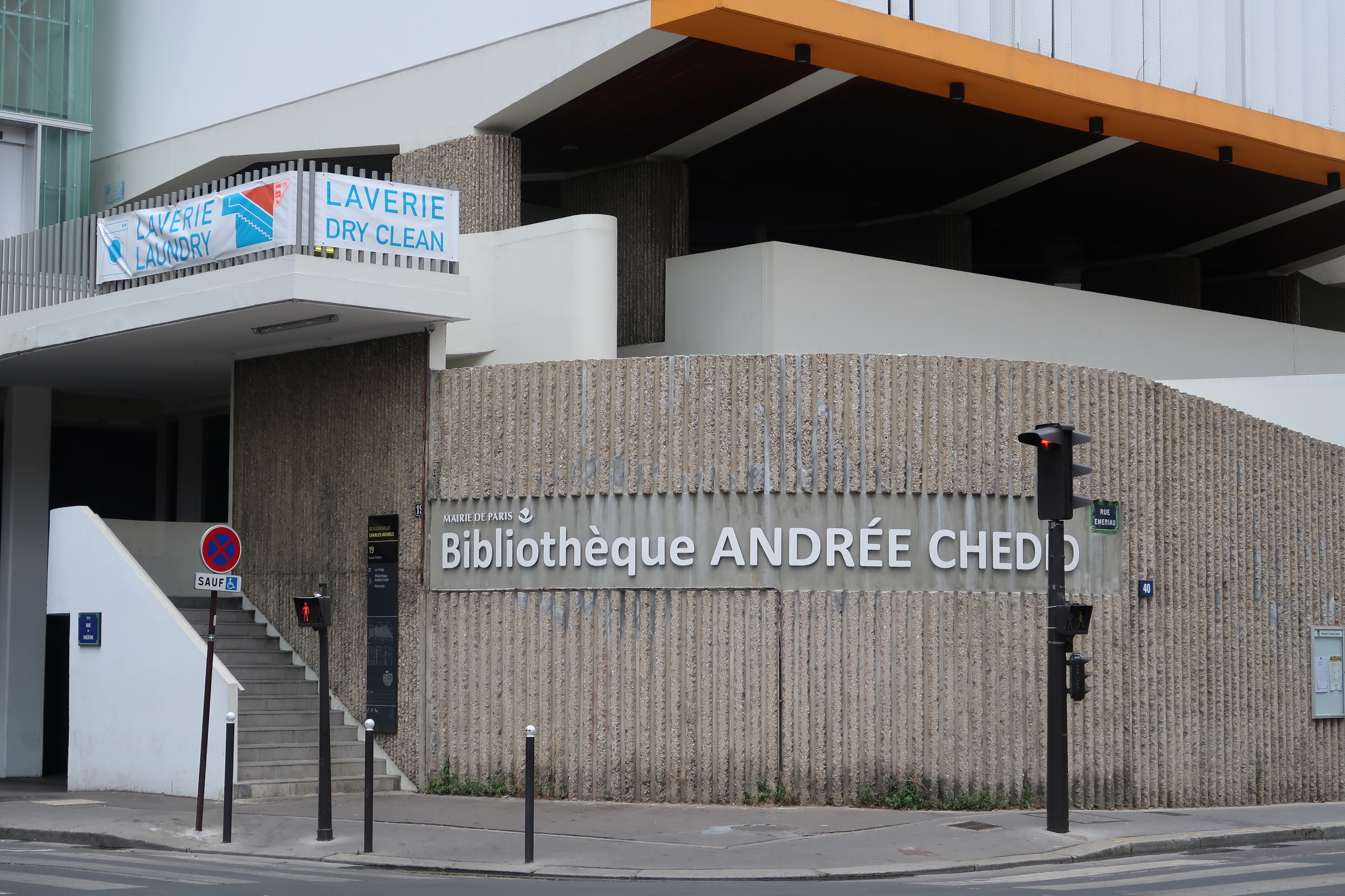
Bibliothèque Andrée-Chedid, 36 Émeriau street (Paris)

== Tribute ==
Several schools in France bear her name: in Rennes, in the Villejean district, in Anstaing (North) and in Aigrefeuille-sur-Maine 9 (Loire-Atlantique).

The library of Villemoisson-sur-Orge (Essonne) carries her name as well as the media libraries Tourcoing, La Seyne-sur-Mer (Var), La Meilleraie-Tillay (Vendée) and the libraries of Beaugrenelle (15 ^{th} arrondissement of Paris) and Alizay 11 (Eure).

== Awards and honours ==
- 1966 Louise Labe prize
- 1975 Grand Prize of French Literature from the Royal Academy of Belgium
- 1976 Mallarmé prize
- 1979 Prix Goncourt de la Nouvelle, Le Corps et le Temps
- 1988 Commandeur of the Ordre des Arts et des Lettres
- 1989 Prix Culture et Bibliothèques pour tous, L'Enfant multiple
- 1990 Grand prix de poésie de la SGDL literary award
- 1990 Gutenberg Prize (France)
- 1994 Grand prix de littérature Paul-Morand (for her entire work)
- 1996 Albert Camus Prize
- 2001 Prix Louis-Guilloux, The Message
- 2002 Prix Goncourt de la Poésie
- 2009 Grand Officier de la Légion d'honneur

== Selected works ==
- Le sixième jour (The sixth day), Paris 1960, ISBN 978-2290022597, made into the movie The Sixth Day (1986) by Youssef Chahine with Dalida in the lead role
- The Other, Roman, Flammarion, Paris 1969, ISBN 2-08-060403-1, made into a movie in 1991 by Bernard Giraudeau for which he was nominated for a César Award
- Painted words or the moth has no mane, Mahnert-Lueg, Munich 1979, ISBN 3-922170-06-4 (translated from the manuscript)
- Behind the Faces, Flammarion, Paris 1984, ISBN 2-08-161787-0
- La femme de Job, narrative, 1992
- Beloved Earth, Poem, Alpha Press, Sulzbach 2006

== Works ==
- À la mort, à la vie: nouvelles. Paris: Flammarion, 1992.
- L'Autre: roman. Paris: Flammarion, 1969.
- Cavernes et soleils: poésie. Paris: Flammarion, 1979.
- Cérémonial de la violence. Paris: Flammarion, 1976.
- La Cité fertile: roman. Paris: Flammarion, 1972.
- Le Dernier candidat. Paris: Éditions théâtrales Art et comédie, 1998
- Le Message. Paris: Éditions Flammarion, 2000
- L'Enfant multiple. Paris: Flammarion, 1989.
- La Maison Sans Racine. Paris: Flammarion, 1985.
- Le Sommeil délivré. Paris: Flammarion, 1952.
- Le Grand Boulevard.Paris :Flammarion,1996
