= The Corporate World =

Studio album by Gail Ann Dorsey
- Released: 1988
- Studio: Smokehouse Studios, London E1; Angel Studios, Islington; Roundhouse Studios, Camden; Crescent Studios, Bath; Ocean Way Recording, Hollywood; The Hit Factory, New York City
- Genre: Pop rock; R&B
- Length: 53:04
- Label: Sire; Reprise; Warner Bros.
- Producer: Nathan East

Gail Ann Dorsey chronology
| The Corporate World (1988) | Rude Blue (1992) |

The Corporate World is the debut studio album by the American musician and singer-songwriter Gail Ann Dorsey. It was released in 1988 by WEA (and released in 1989 by Sire Records in the United States). Produced by bass guitarist Nathan East, the album features guest appearances from singer-songwriter and guitarist Eric Clapton and Gang of Four member Andy Gill. The album's style has been described as "an unorthodox and individualistic blend of rock, pop and R&B."

The single "Wasted Country" peaked at number 76 in the UK in September 1988, though the album itself did not chart there. The album reached the top ten on the Dutch Album Chart. The album was dedicated to Dorsey's "mother, and to all my nieces and nephews - may you find the beauty of life within yourselves...then share it..." She also acknowledged Joni Mitchell, Woody Allen, Heart, Lindsay Wagner, Jimi Hendrix, Mingus, Chaka Khan, Sigourney Weaver, Stevie Wonder, Richard Bach and Beethoven for "creative brilliance and a lifetime of inspiration". "S.W.4" is the postcode for Clapham North where Dorsey purchased a flat with her advance from Warner Bros.

== Critical reception ==
Professional ratings
Review scores
| Source | Rating |
|---|---|
| AllMusic | 3/5 stars |
| Robert Christgau | B |

AllMusic critic Alex Henderson described the album as "an artistic triumph, but a commercial bomb," noting that "had it been released after alternative rock really exploded in 1992, it might have enjoyed the type of success it deserved." On the album, music critic Robert Christgau wrote: "Pet Shop Boys, this is how it sounds with soul." Christgau also stated that the side one features "conventional exercises," while "from the literal title tune to the Beethoven-drenched romantic climax, side two is the yuppie blues."

== Track listing ==
All songs written and composed by Gail Ann Dorsey; except where indicated

1. "Wasted Country" – 5:02
2. "Where Is Your Love?" – 4:08
3. "If Only You" – 4:23
4. "Just Another Dream" (Dorsey, Nathan East) – 4:36
5. "So Hard to Let You Go" – 4:17
6. "The Corporate World" – 6:24
7. "No Time" – 4:34
8. "S.W.4." – 1:09
9. "Wishing I Was Someone Else" – 2:04
10. "Carry Me Off to Heaven" – 7:32

== Personnel ==
- Gail Ann Dorsey – vocals (1, 2, 4–11); backing vocals (4, 5, 7, 11); bass (7, 8, 11); acoustic guitar (3–6, 11); guitar (4, 7–9), cover concept
- Nathan East – bass (1–2, 5–6, 9–10); keyboards (1, 7–8, 10); production (1–2, 5–11)
- Bub Roberts – guitar (2, 5–11)
- Eric Clapton – guitar
- Andy Gill – guitar (1)
- Steve Ferrone – drums (1, 2, 5, 8, 10)
- Gavin Harrison – drums (6, 9)
- Marcel East – keyboards (2, 5–7, 9–10)
- Mick Gallagher – keyboards (1, 8)
- Jerry Hey – trumpet, horn arrangements
- Gary Grant – trumpet
- Bill Reichenbach Jr. – trombone
- Kim Hutchcroft – tenor and baritone saxophone
- Carol Kenyon – backing vocals (2, 9, 10)
- Katie Kissoon – backing vocals (1, 8)
- Tessa Niles – backing vocals (1, 2, 8–10)
- David Clarke – backing vocals
- Anne Dudley – piano, synthesizer, string arrangement
- Ted Hayton – drum programming, recording; mixing (1, 3, 4, 6, 8–11)

Technical

- Tom Lord-Alge – mixing (2, 5, 7)
- Allen Sides – recording (horns)
- Tom Leader – recording (strings)
- Clif Norrell – engineering
- Helen Blackhouse – art direction
- Kevin Davies – cover photography
