= Julien Lourau =

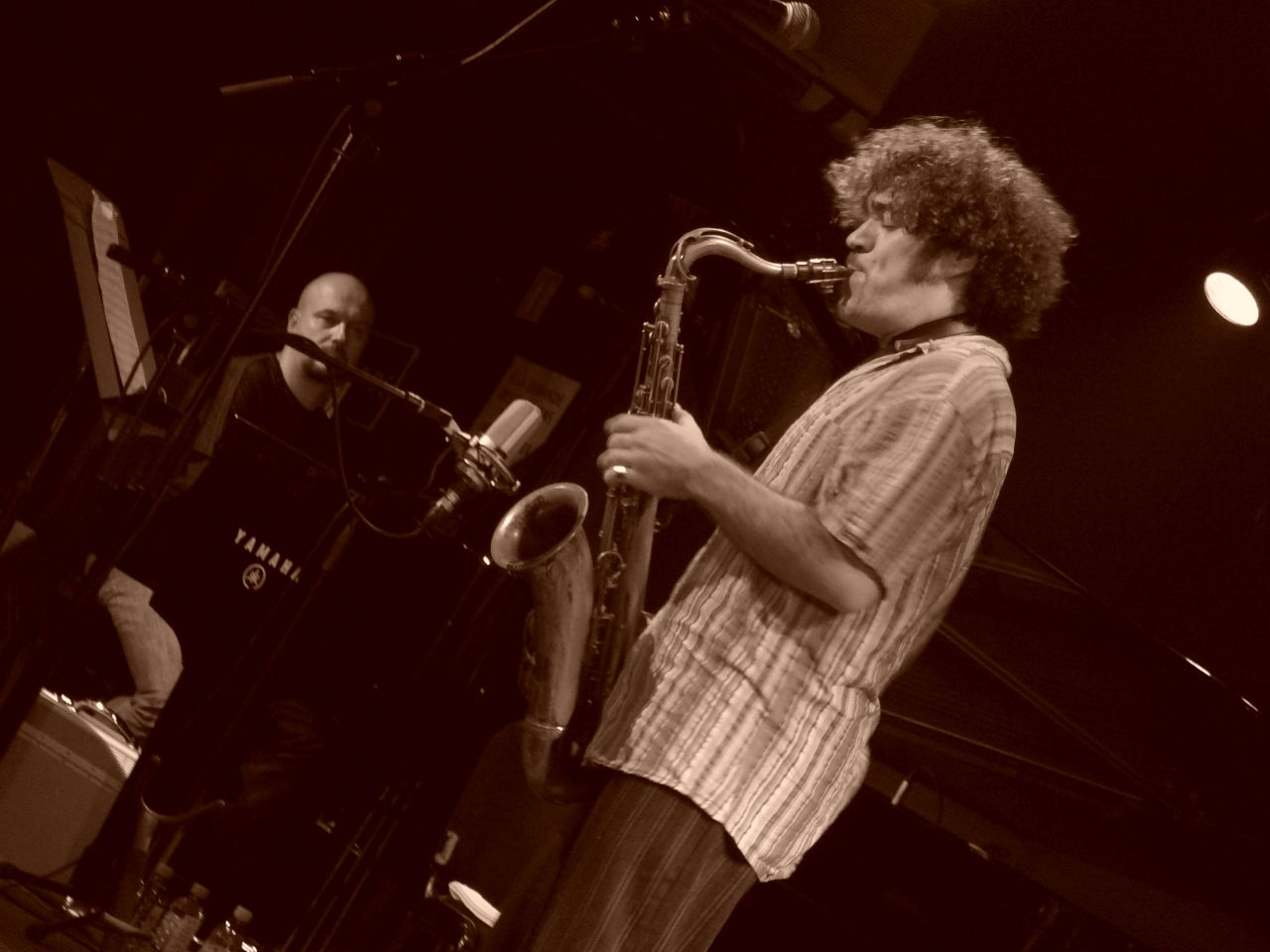

Background information
- Born: 1970 (age 54–55)
- Origin: France
- Genres: Mainstream jazz, avant-garde jazz, Electronic
- Occupation(s): Bandleader, composer
- Instrument(s): Tenor saxophone, alto saxophone
- Labels: Label Bleu

Julien Lourau (born 3/2/1970) is a French jazz saxophonist. He is the son of sociologist René Lourau.

Julien Lourau made his début in the group Trash Corporation with guitarist Noël Akchoté and pianist Bojan Zulfikarpasic. He also founded the group Olympic Gramofon with Sébastien Martel, Vincent Ségal, Eric Löhrer, Cyril Atef, and DJ Shalom.

In 1992, Julien Lourau won the first soloist prize in La Défense and went on to set up his Groove Gang.

In 1999, he experimented with electronic music for his album Gambit which attracted a following from young French people and led to a number of successful concerts. He won that year's jazz trophy at the "Victoires de la Musique" awards. He returned to a more traditional jazz in 2002 with the album The rise, regarded as his most mature album. 2007 saw the release of Julien Lourau vs Rumbabierta which combines Lourau's avant-garde jazz with Afro-Cuban sounds. Julien Lourau also collaborated with the hip hop dance collectif le Groove Gang in a show untitled « Come fly with us ». By doing so, he encountered the French hip hop dance pioneer Bintou Demébélé, who was at the moment a member of the Groove Gang. Julien Lourau will thereafter invite her to dance at some of his concerts.

His composition includes forms absorbed from Latin, African, Caribbean and European folk music.

== Discography ==
- Groove Gang (Label Bleu, 1995)
- City Boom Boom (Warner, 1998)
- Gambit (Warner, 2000)
- The Rise (Label Bleu, 2001)
- Fire & Forget (Label Bleu, 2005)
- Forget (Label Bleu, 2005)
- Julien Lourau VS Rumbabierta (Label Bleu, 2007)
- Quartet Saigon (Naive, 2009)
- Duo (2birds1stone, 2015)
- Julien Lourau & The Groove Retrievers (2birds1stone, 2017)
- Power of Soul, the Music of CTI (Komos, 2021)
- Crianças, the Music of Wayne Shorter (Komos, 2023)
