= Gianmaria Testa =

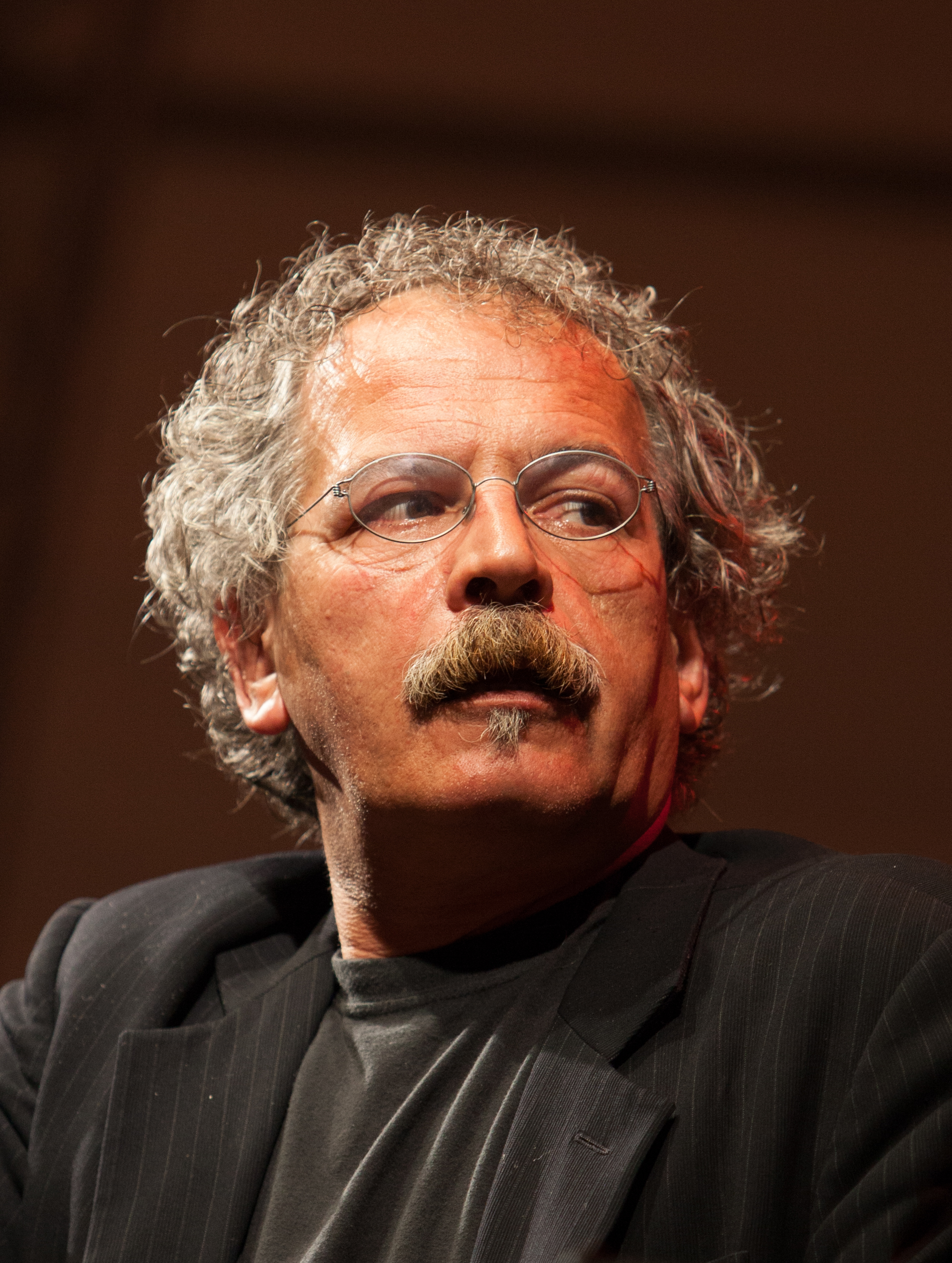
- Gianmaria Testa in 2013

Background information
- Born: 17 October 1958; Cavallermaggiore, Piedmont, Italy
- Died: 30 March 2016 (aged 57) Alba, Piedmont, Italy
- Occupations: Singer, songwriter
- Website: www.gianmariatesta.com

Gianmaria Testa (17 October 1958 – 30 March 2016) was an Italian singer-songwriter and guitarist.

Testa began musical performances in 1990 and in the early 1990s, he won two consecutive top prizes at the Recanati Festival. His first album "Montgolfières" was issued in 1995 in a collaboration between the French Label Bleu and Harmonia Mundi. Throughout his musical career, Testa continued to work as a station master at the train station in Cuneo, Italy. He sang in Italian and French and his music bore resemblances to folk, jazz and world music.
