= Matthieu Chedid =

French musician (born 1971)

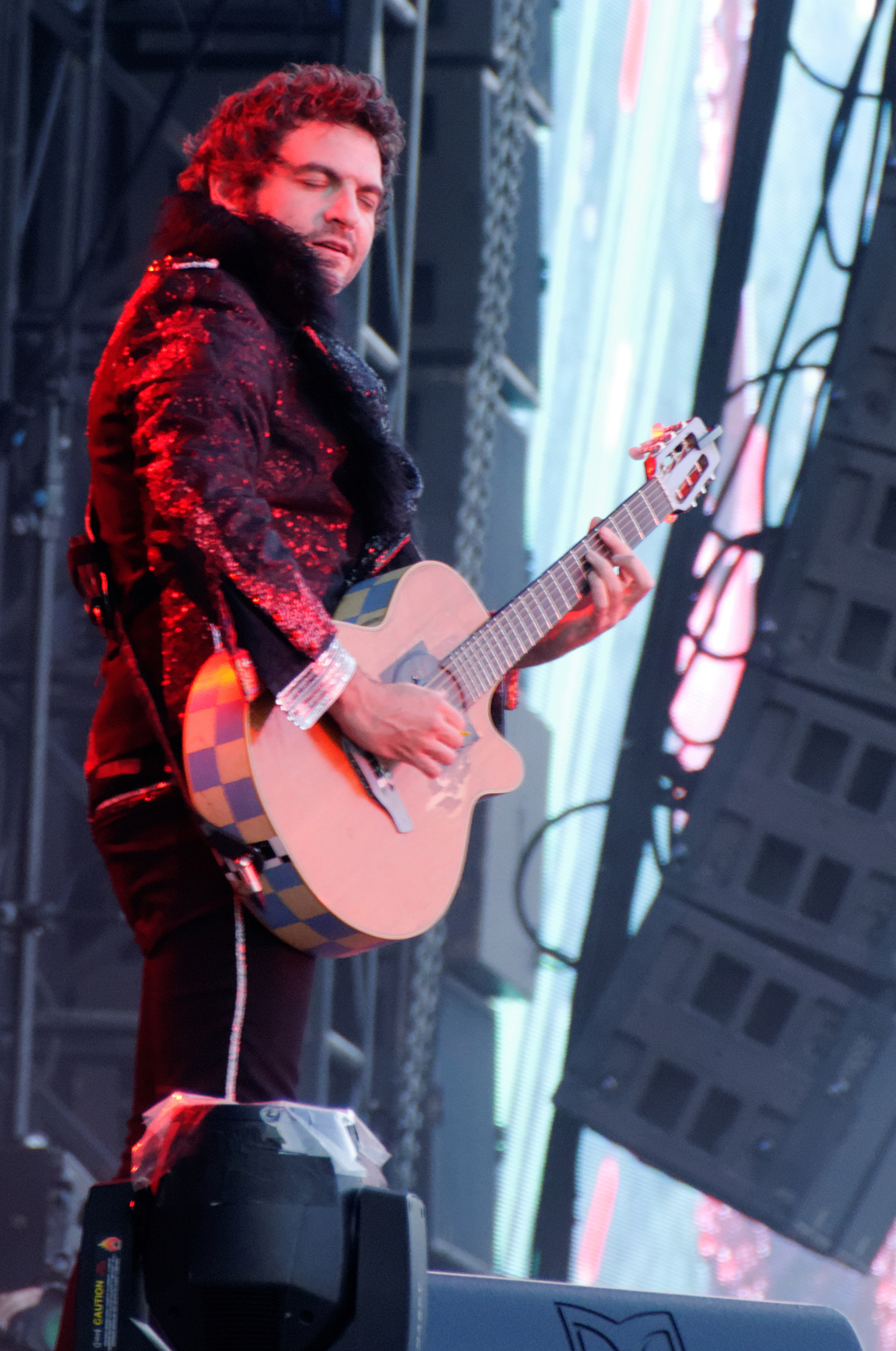
- Chedid performing in 2013

Background information
- Also known as: -M-
- Born: Matthieu Arnaud Sidney Chedid; 21 December 1971 (age 54); Boulogne-Billancourt, France
- Genres: Chanson; rock; funk
- Occupation: Musician
- Instruments: Bass guitar; guitar; keyboards; drums; kazoo; vocals
- Years active: 1978–present
- Labels: Barclay; Delabel
- Member of: Lamomali
- Website: labo-m.net

Matthieu Chedid (born 21 December 1971) is a French multi-instrumentalist and singer-songwriter.

Chedid began his career as a session musician playing both acoustic and electric guitar. In the late 1990s, he rose to fame as a singer-songwriter and musician under the alias M (often stylized as -M-), blending Nouvelle Chanson, electronic and rock music. In studio, he experiments with various instruments and electronic music, while on tour as -M- he mostly plays the guitar, and is known for his eccentric outfits and dramatic live performances, sometimes including special effects.

Chedid has also performed in the 2005 stage musical Le soldat rose and is part of French-Malian band Lamomali. Since 2018, he has been the most awarded artist at the Victoires de la Musique Awards with 13 awards, tied with Alain Bashung.

== Biography ==
Matthieu Arnaud Sidney Chedid was born in Boulogne-Billancourt, Hauts-de-Seine, France. His father Louis Chedid is a singer from a family of Lebanese and Syrian extraction, of Maronite and Greek Orthodox Christian background. Louis Chedid's mother Andrée (née Saab) was an Egyptian-born French writer and poet, who has written lyrics for Matthieu Chedid's songs. Matthieu Chedid's sisters are the music video and concert director Émilie Chedid (born in 1970) and French singer Anna Chedid (born in 1987), also known by her stage name Nach. His brother Joseph "Selim" Chedid (born in 1986) is also a French singer and a guitar and drums player.

Chedid took an interest in music early on. In 1978, at the age of six, Chedid lent his voice to the chorus of his father's hit song T'as beau pas être beau alongside older sister, Émilie. During his teenage years and early twenties, Chedid was part of short-lasting groups such as Tam Tam, Les Bébés fous and Les Poissons Rouges with Mathieu Boogaerts, as well as Julien Voulzy and Pierre Souchon (respectively the sons of singers Laurent Voulzy and Alain Souchon) who went on to form the duo Les Cherche Midi.

He has collaborated with a number of artists, both on stage and in the recording studio. Early into his solo career, Chedid was the opening act for Texas concerts. He has recorded with NTM, Sinclair, Billy Ze Kick, Brigitte Fontaine, Sean Lennon, Vanessa Paradis, and Johnny Hallyday.

Until 2008, Chedid was in a relationship with French actress Audrey Tautou.

=== -M- ===
Chedid performs and records under the stage name -M-. Chedid created -M- as means of overcoming his shyness on stage and also as a way of distancing his work from that of his father and grandmother. The pseudonym comes from Chedid's first initial but also refers to the similar-sounding French word aime, meaning love. The character -M- is a superhero, noted for having a playful nature, and recognized for his flamboyant costumes (primarily monochrome suits with slim trousers and long jackets with upward pointed collars) and hair styled into the shape of an M.

In 1997, -M- released his first solo album Le Baptême. During this time; he played mainly solo or with the cellist Vincent Ségal. The album received overall positive critical reception, but public recognition only came a few months later, with the release of the single "Machistador".

=== Je dis aime ===
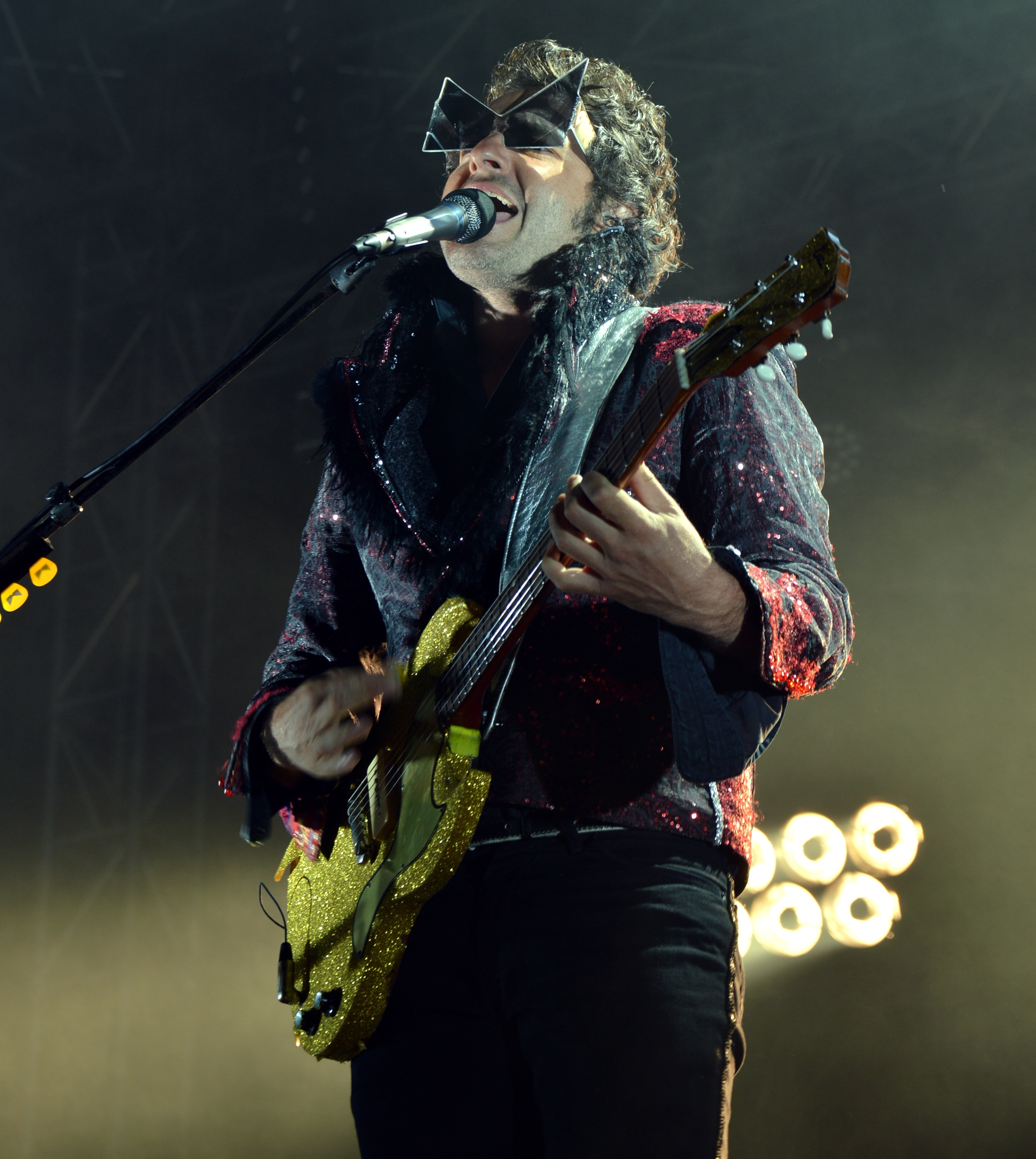
Chedid performing in 2014

In 1999, -M- published his second album, Je dis aime a title that puns 'aime' (like/love) with 'M'. A few months later, the album was 11th on the French Charts, with more than 500,000 albums sold, thanks to a number of successful songs ("Je dis aime", "Onde Sensuelle", "Monde Virtuel", "Le complexe du corn-flakes", "Mama Sam").

Live, -M- played with Cyril Atef, Vincent Segal and DJ Shalom for the samples on some songs. He still works with his sister Emilie Chedid for the realisation of the clips. His live performance largely contributed to his success, playing on his character of -M- to transform every concert into a show. He won his first Victoire de la Musique awards for Male Artist of the Year and Concert of the Year.

=== "Belleville Rendez-vous" and Qui de nous deux ===
-M- gained international exposure through his recording of the song "Belleville Rendez-vous" for the soundtrack of the 2003 Sylvain Chomet animated film The Triplets of Belleville in both French and English. The song, with lyrics by Chomet and music by Benoit Charest, was nominated for a 2003 Academy Award. The music video for "Belleville Rendez-vous" uses both a live-action depiction of -M- and an animated depiction incorporated into footage from the film.

In autumn 2003, he released his 3rd album Qui de nous deux (Which one of us two) with the singles "Qui de nous deux", "La bonne étoile", "Mon ego". Softer, this album saw the birth of his first daughter, Billie, for whom an all-pink guitar was built by instrument-maker Cyril Guérin. A pink guitar can be seen in the video for "Qui de nous deux".

In 2007, he worked once again with Vanessa Paradis on her album Divinidylle, released in September 2007.

=== Mister Mystère ===
Rumors circulated before the release of his 2009 studio album, Mister Mystère, that Chedid had decided to drop the character -M- to record and perform under his given name. The album, however, was released under the name -M- but included photographs of the singer without the wild costumes and hair associated with the -M- character. The music video for the first single, "Le Roi des ombres", showed Chedid burning a tiny effigy of his alterego.

=== Louis, Matthieu, Joseph et Anna Chedid ===
Chedid was part of the musical group Louis, Matthieu, Joseph et Anna Chedid with several members of his family. They began with a tour in 2015, which was followed by a studio recording.

=== Îl, Lamomali, and Lettre infinie ===
In autumn 2012, he released the album, Îl, played with Lawrence Clais and Brad Thomas Ackley.

He worked with Toumani Diabaté and Sidiki Diabaté on a collective album, Lamomali, released in March 2017 The album also features many well regarded names from the world music scene, such as Philippe Jaroussky, Oxmo Puccino, Youssou N'Dour, Seu Jorge, and Fatoumata Diawara, lending a mesmeric world music flavour to it that celebrates cultural diversity and world peace. The album "showcases musical stylings from across the planet, whilst at its core it contains a traditional West African rhythm".

In 2019, he released the studio album, Lettre infinie, featuring collaborations from Thomas Bangalter and Phillipe Zdar. His album Rêvalité was released in June 2022.

== Public image ==
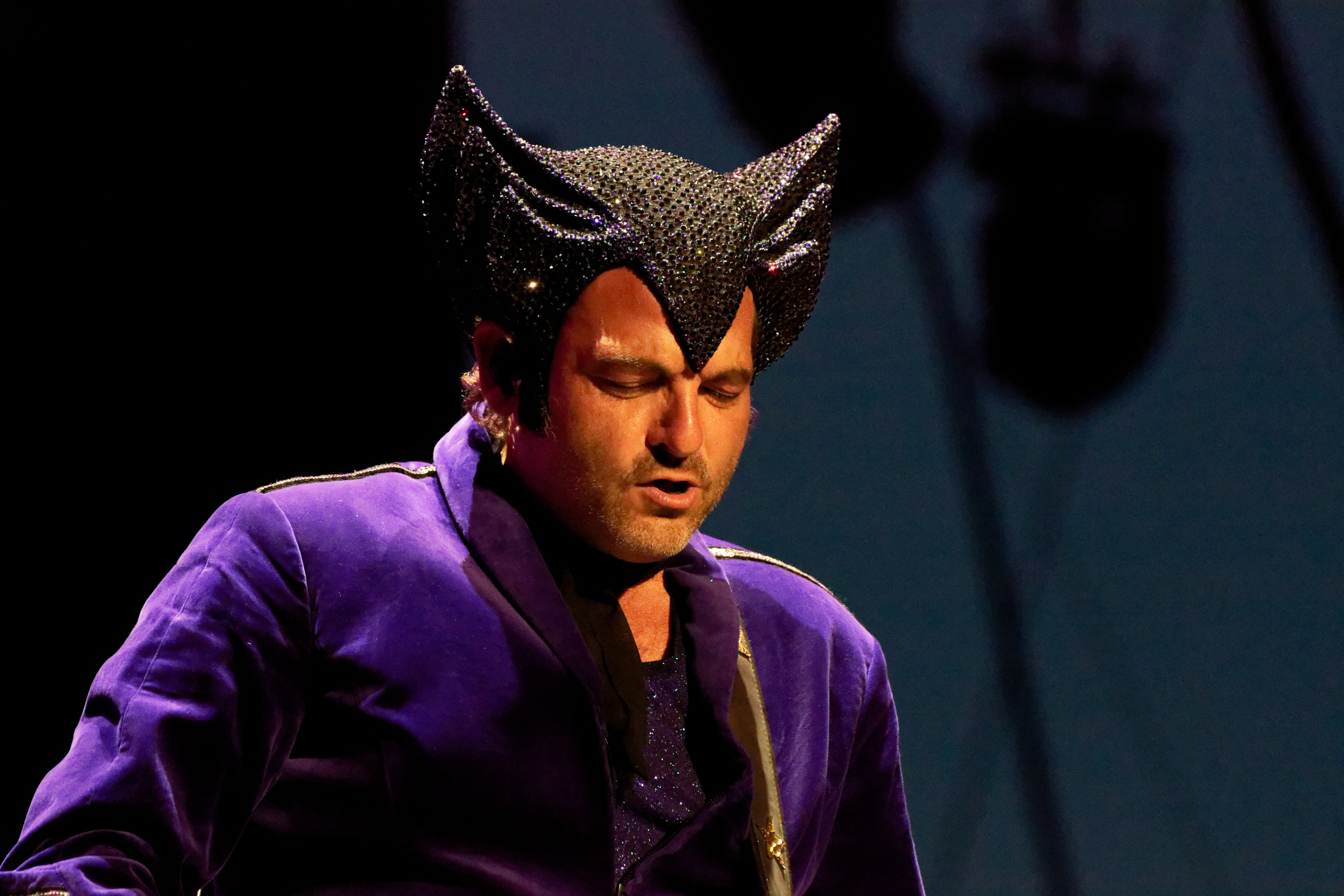
Chedid performing as -M- in 2022

Chedid is mostly known for his onstage persona -M- whose signature hairstyle is reminiscent of the letter M and was initially achieved using hair wax. According to Chedid, the hairstyle was inspired by the ear tufts of certain species of owls, from a lithography of an owl given by his grandmother Andrée. The letter M also appears as a pattern in the character's clothes, in music videos and stage sets. With his energetic personality, eccentric outfits and hairstyle, the character has drawn comparisons with English musician David Bowie's stage persona Ziggy Stardust. Besides Matthieu Chedid, the character -M- has also been portrayed by actor Vincent Lindon in the music video for Chedid's song La bonne étoile. In promotional material and music videos for his 2009 album Mister Mystère, Chedid is seen with natural hair instead of the signature M-shaped hairstyle. The lyrics of some of the songs, and the music video of Le Roi des Ombres ending with Chedid burning a tiny effigy of the -M- character, led to speculation about whether he would abandon his alter ego. Chedid eventually kept performing the character, showing his natural hair or wearing M-shaped wigs or helmets.

== Awards ==
Chedid holds the gold place in number of Victoires de la Musique awards, with 13 awards

Year	Catégorie des Victoires de la musique	Result
1999	Best new artist	Nominated
1999	Best music video : Machistador (réal. Émilie Chedid)	Nominated
2000	Male artist of the year	Won
2000	Tour of the Year (Je dis aime à l'Elysée Montmartre et en tournée)	Won
2000	Album pop-rock of the year (Je dis aime)	Nominated
2004	Male artist of the year	Nominated
2004	Tour of the Year (L'Avantour à l'Elysée Montmartre)	Nominated
2005	Male artist of the year	Won
2005	Album of the year (Qui de nous deux?)	Won
2005	Tour of the Year (M à l'Olympia et en tournée)	Won
2005	Best music videos on DVD : Les Leçons de musique de -M- (réal. : Émilie Chedid)	Won
2005	Best music video (Ma Mélodie, réal. : Cyril Houplain)	Nominated
2006	Best music video (La Bonne Étoile, réal. : Laurent Seroussi)	Nominated
2006	Best music video (Est-ce que tu aimes ? par Arthur H et -M-, réal. : Rodolphe Pauly)	Won
2007	Best music videos on DVD (tournée En tête à tête, réal.: Thierry Gautier et Sylvain Leduc)	Nominated
2007	Best score soundntrack of the year (B.O. de Ne le dis à personne)	Won
2010	Album of the year (Mister Mystère)	Nominated
2010	Tour of the Year (M à la Cigale - Auguri Productions)	Nominated
2011	Tour of the Year (-M- au château de Versailles - Auguri Productions)	Won
2012	Best music video (La Seine par Vanessa Paradis et -M-, réal. : Bibo Bergeron)	Won
2012	Best music videos on DVD (Les Saisons de passage, réal. : Laurent Thessier)	Won
2013	Male artist of the year	Nominated
2013	Album of the year (Îl)	Nominated
2013	Best music video (Mojo, réal. : Beryl Koltz)	Nominated
2014	Tour of the Year (Îl(s) - Labo M / Auguri Productions)	Won
2016	Tour of the Year (Louis, Matthieu, Joseph et Anna Chedid à l'Olympia, à l'Opéra Garnier et en tournée - Auguri Productions)	Nominated
2018	World music album of the year (Lamomali avec Toumani et Sidiki Diabaté, Fatoumata Diawara)	Won

== Discography ==
=== Albums ===
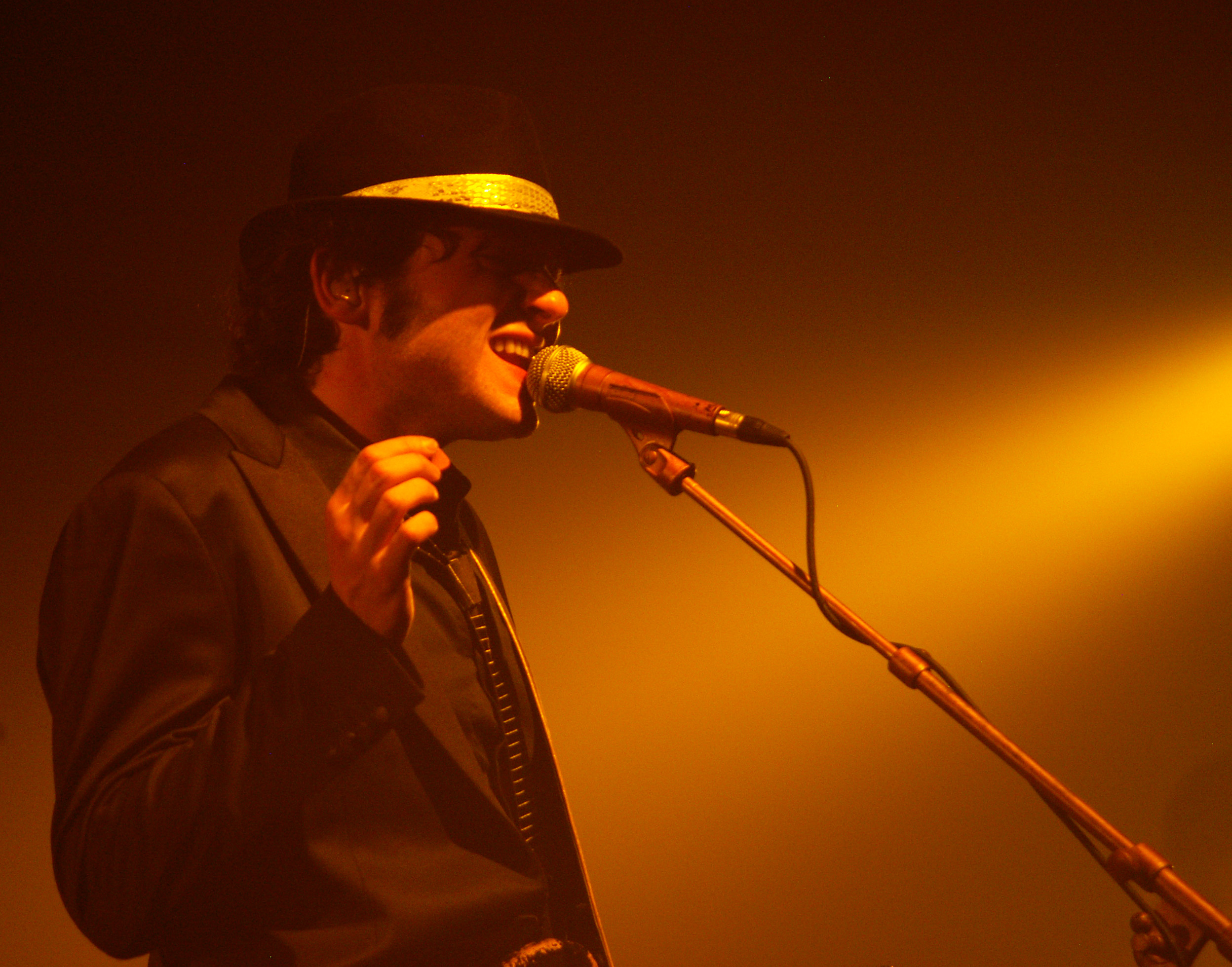
Matthieu Chedid during a concert with Vanessa Paradis at Châteauroux in November 2007

Studio albums

Year	Album	Peak positions			Certifications
Year	Album	FRA	BEL (Wa)	SWI	Certifications
1997	Le Baptême	35	–	–	
1999	Je dis aime	11	–	–	
2003	Labo M (instrumental)	27	–	–	
2003	Qui de nous deux	1	4	76	
2009	Mister Mystère	1	3	16	
2012	Îl	4	9	39	
2019	Lettre infinie	1	7	11	
2022	Rêvalité	2	9	27	

Collaborations

Year	Album	Peak positions			Certifications
Year	Album	FRA	BEL (Wa)	SWI	Certifications
2015	Louis Matthieu Joseph & Anna Chedid (Louis Matthieu Joseph & Anna Chedid)	3	10	24	
2017	Lamomali (with Toumani Diabaté and Sidiki Diabaté)	2	22	31	
2017	Lamomali Airlines (with Toumani Diabaté and Sidiki Diabaté)	35	–	–	

Live albums

Year	Album	Peak positions			Certifications
Year	Album	FRA	BEL (Wa)	SWI	Certifications
2001	Le tour de -M-	3	–	–	
2005	-M- au Spectrum	–	–	–	
2005	En tête à tête	2	26	93	
2010	Les saisons de passage	14	76	–	
2013	Îl(s)	27	145	–	
2017	Lamomali Live	92	–	–	
2019	Le grand petit concert	24	–	–	

Soundtracks

Year	Album	Peak positions			Certifications
Year	Album	FRA	BEL (Wa)	SWI	Certifications
2007	Ne le dis à personne (soundtrack)	103	–	–	
2011	Un monstre à Paris (soundtrack by Vanessa Paradis & -M- / Patrice Renson)	7	10	–	

Rereleases

Year	Album	Peak positions
Year	Album	FRA
2002	Le Baptême / Je dis aime	127
2004	Le Baptême / Je dis aime / Labo M	166
2004	Le tour de M / Qui de nous deux	130
2005	Qui de nous deux / Je dis aime / Le Baptême	92
2008	Je dis aime / Qui de nous deux	78

=== Singles ===
==== As main artist ====
Single	Year	Peak positions					Album
Single	Year	FRA	BEL (Fl) Ultratip	BEL (Wa) Ultratop	BEL (Wa) Ultratip	SWI	Album
"Machistador"	1998	83	–	–	–	–	
"Onde sensuelle" / "Je dis aime"	2000	46	–	–	–	–	
"Qui de nous deux"	2004	40	–	–	3	83	
"À tes souhaits"	2004	78	–	–	16	–	
"Ma mélodie"	2004	67	–	–	12	–	
"La bonne étoile"	2005	50	–	–	–	–	
"Mister Mystère"	2009	–	–	–	–	–	Mister Mystère
"Le roi des ombres"	2009	–	–	28	–	–	Mister Mystère
"Est-ce que c'est ça?"	2009	–	–	–	20	–	Mister Mystère
"Amssétou"	2010	–	–	–	20	–	Mister Mystère
"Tu peux compter sur moi" (with Louis Chedid)	2010	–	–	8	–	–	On ne dit jamais assez aux gens qu'on aime qu'on les aime
"La Seine" (with Vanessa Paradis)	2011	9	37	3	–	–	Un monstre à Paris
"Mojo"	2012	27	–	27	–	–	Îl
"Baïa"	2012	137	–	–	31	–	Îl
"Océan"	2013	–	–	–	16	–	Îl
"Superchérie"	2018	113	–	–	29	–	Lettre infinie
"Grand petit con"	2019	–	–	–	–	–	Lettre infinie
"Thérapie"	2019	–	–	–	–	–	Lettre infinie
"Massaï"	2019	–	–	–	–	–	Lettre infinie

==== Collaborations ====
Year	Single	Peak positions		Album
Year	Single	FRA	BEL (Wa) Ultratip	Album
2001	"Y'a des zazous" (Brigitte Fontaine & -M-)	50	–	
2007	"L'éclipse" (Sean Lennon & -M-)	–	8	
2015	"F.O.R.T."	98	28	Louis Matthieu Joseph & Anna Chedid
2015	"On ne dit jamais assez aux gens qu'on aime qu'on les aime"	132	–	Louis Matthieu Joseph & Anna Chedid
2016	"Baby That's You"	151	–	
2016	"Bal de Bamako" (-M-, Toumani Diabaté & Sidiki Diabaté feat. Fatoumata Diawara & Oxmo Puccino)	140	41	
2017	"Cet air" (-M-, Toumani Diabaté & Sidiki Diabaté feat. Fatoumata Diawara)	–	Tip	

==== Other hits ====
Year	Single	Peak positions		Album
Year	Single	FRA	BEL (Wa) Ultratip	Album
1997	"Le baptême" / "La grosse bombe" (limited release)	–	–	
1998	"Au suivant"	–	–	
2000	"Le complexe du corn flakes"	–	–	

==== Charity ====
- 2016: "Vole" (with Nolwenn Leroy, Alain Souchon, Laurent Voulzy...)

== Bibliography ==
- Les Âmes de Mogador (2003), with Patrice Renson : tribute to Essaouira (Maroc). A CD of ten unreleased tracks is included.
- -M-, qui de nous deux (2004), with Claude Gassian : book produced during the recording of the album Qui de nous deux
- -M- de A à Z (2005), by Mathias Goudeau
- Le monde de -M- (2005), with Marianne Chedid, Sonia Rachline and Sophie Laurent : insight on his career, with a lot of pictures
- -M- le mot dit : esthétique d'un funkistador by Marc Borbon: analysis of M's world through a fan's own experience
- Le Livre Extraordinaire de -M- by Lisa Roze: package of an archival photographs, unpublished shootings, a book, postcards, a pop-up, a new song (Si Si No No), etc.

Preceded by Alain Bashung	Victoires de la Musique; Male artist of the year 2000	Succeeded by Henri Salvador
Preceded by Calogero	Victoires de la Musique; Male group or artist of the year 2005	Succeeded by Raphaël
