= Mister Mystère =

Studio album by M
- Released: 2009
- Recorded: 2009
- Genre: Rock
- Length: 55:52
- Label: Barclay

M chronology
| Qui de nous deux (2003) | Mister Mystère (2009) | Îl (2012) |

Mister Mystère, released in 2009, is the fourth studio album by French singer-songwriter Matthieu Chedid in his persona as M (or fifth if including the instrumental album, Labo M). It was his first studio album after a six-year hiatus during which he had concentrated on live music along with side projects including collaborations with his father, Louis Chedid, Malian musicians Amadou & Mariam and French singer Vanessa Paradis (notably on the album Divinidylle).

== Style and reception ==
The reappearance of M in a more sombre 'black-and-white' persona without his former reliance on vivid colours (notably pink) and wild distinctive haircut caused considerable media attention. The music remained an idiosyncratic mix but was declared by critics to be 'innovative' with 'more sensual' lyrics that overall represented a 'successful metamorphosis' for the artist. However, other critics saw the project as falling flat and Telerama considered that only Délivre and L'élixir really broke the funky monotony of the work.

Commercially successful in France Mister Mystère sold 51,000 copies in the first week of release, out-selling rival albums One Love by David Guetta and Volume 10 by Marc Lavoine. It spent only one week at number 1 in France but has remained in the top 100.

== Collaborators ==
The team with whom Chedid created and recorded the album included Brigitte Fontaine, author Georges Kretek, filmmaker Guillaume Canet and much of his own family including father Louis (mixing, lyricist on "Hold-Up"), brother Joseph (drums), sister Anna (chorus) and another sister Émilie who helped with the production of the accompanying DVD.

== Track listing ==
Disc 1

1. "Mister Mystère"
2. "Phébus"
3. "Est-ce que c'est ça?"
4. "Le Roi des ombres"
5. "Tanagra"
6. "L'Élixir"
7. "Ça sonne faux"
8. "Destroy"
9. "Semaine"
10. "Amssétou"
11. "Tout sauf toi"
12. "Hold-Up"
13. "Délivre"

Disc 2

1. "Lettre à Tanagra" (Lettres à Tanagra)
2. "Brigand" (Lettres à Tanagra)
3. "Crise" (Lettres à Tanagra)
4. "Je les adore" (Lettres à Tanagra)
5. "Le Roi des ombres" (demo; released only on iTunes)

Part of the content was available through an Opendisc Enhanced Music CD, which had to be used in conjunction with the album's website.
