= Je dis aime =

Studio album by M
- Released: 2000
- Recorded: 1999
- Genre: Rock
- Label: Virgin France

M chronology
Le Baptême (1997)	Je dis aime (2000)	Labo M (2003)

Je dis aime (1999) is the second studio album by French singer-songwriter Matthieu Chedid, in his persona as M, described by reviewers as a "conceptual icon to rival Bowie's Ziggy Stardust and Aladdin Sane".

== Critical reception ==
Professional ratings
Review scores
Source	Rating
AllMusic	4/5 stars

The album was described as managing to take a remarkable variety of musical directions and pull them together into a consistent whole. Another reviewer described the album as sounding like a "French Lenny Kravitz" and noted the "vintage 70s sound and textures".

== Wordplay ==
Je dis aime is a play on words in French as "aime" (love) is pronounced exactly the same as "M". Many of the tracks use similar wordplay as is common in French songs but particularly rich in M's work.

== Track listing ==
1. "Monde virtuel"
2. "Je dis aime" (written by Andrée Chedid, M's grandmother)
3. "Onde sensuelle"
4. "À celle qui dure"
5. "Faut oublier"
6. "Le Festival de connes" (pokes fun at the pretentiousness of the Cannes film festival changing Cannes to connes – i.e. idiots)
7. "Le Mec hamac"
8. "Close to Me" (loosely a cover of the song by the Cure but using only one line in English from the original)
9. "Émilie 1000 Volts" (salsa flavoured track)
10. "Qui est le plus fragile"
11. "Le Complexe du corn flakes"
12. "Au lieu du crime"
13. "Bonoboo" (written by Andrée Chedid, the song refers to a type of pygmy chimpanzee that shares over 98% of its DNA with humans)
14. "Le Commun des motels"
15. "Mama Sam" (Mama Sam as compared to Uncle Sam, with puns on words like Nike, called "Nique")
