= Qui de nous deux =

Studio album by M
- Released: November 2003
- Recorded: 2003
- Genre: French pop-rock
- Length: 52:19
- Label: Delabel/EMI France

M chronology
Labo M (2003)	Qui de nous deux (2003)	Mister Mystère (2009)

Qui de nous deux (2003) is an album by French singer-songwriter Matthieu Chedid in his persona as M. It is his third full studio album, or the fourth if including the instrumental work Labo M which he had released earlier the same year. The title of the album and its best known track means 'Which of Us Two' reflecting the ongoing contrast between Chedid's real persona and that of his invented character M. The album's liner notes explain that the love discussed in that song are for the pink guitar that features on both the album cover and the surreal music video that accompanied the song. The pink guitar had been specially created to celebrate the birth of Chedid's daughter Billie in 2002.

Stylistically the music on this album remains as eclectic as in Chedid's earlier works, albeit with an overall softer edge.

== Reception ==
The album was a major hit in France, entering the French charts at number 1 and spending over 22 months in the French top 100. It was released in 2004 in Canada where Amazon.ca listed it as one of the best albums of 2004.

The French edition of Rolling Stone magazine named this album the 97th greatest French rock album (out of 100).

== Track listing ==
1. "Mon égo"
2. "La Bonne Étoile"
3. "Sous ta peau"
4. "À tes souhaits"
5. "Qui de nous deux"
6. "Ma mélodie"
7. "Quand je vais chez elle"
8. "La Corde sensible"
9. "Je me démasque"
10. "C'est pas ta faute"
11. "Gimmick"
12. "Le Radeau"
13. "Psyko bug"
14. "Peau de fleur"
15. "Ton écho"
