= Labo M =

Studio album by Matthieu Chedid
- Released: February 2003
- Genre: French pop-rock; instrumental
- Length: 38:25
- Label: Delabel/EMI France

Matthieu Chedid chronology
Je dis aime (1999)	Labo M (2003)	Qui de nous deux (2003)

Labo M (2003) is the third studio album by French singer-songwriter Matthieu Chedid in his persona as M. It is an all-instrumental work which, considering that one of M's trademarks had previously been his inventive wordplay, caused some degree of discontent amongst parts of his fanbase. Remarkably successful for an instrumental work, the album entered the French charts at number 27 but proved to be a stopgap with the full studio album Qui de nous deux appearing later the same year.

The album's title meaning "M's Laboratory", is a pun on La Bohème as well as the name of Chedid's recording studio.

== Track listing ==
1. "Tapis Volant 1"
2. "Slide Melody"
3. "Les Saules"
4. "L'Automat"
5. "Ricken"
6. "Stan est Stone"
7. "Au Kazoo"
8. "Jam à la Mer"
9. "Tapis Volant 2"
10. "Coup d'Trash"
11. "La Nébuleuse"
