= Mamadou Sidiki Diabaté =

Malian kora player (born 1982)

Mamadou Sidiki Diabaté (born 23 September 1982) is a Mandé kora player and jeli from Bamako, Mali. He is the 71st generation of kora players in his family and a son of Sidiki Diabaté.

== Biography ==
Diabaté, widely known as "Madou," was born on 23 September 1982, in Bamako, Mali. He is a Muslim and he is the youngest son of the late Sidiki Diabaté and Mariam Kouyaté. He is part of the seventy-first generation of kora players in his family. His family has a long heritage in the oral tradition of jalis (sometimes spelled djeli), or griots. "Jali" is the Mandingo word for the repository musician and storyteller of Mande's ancient oral tradition, transmitting history and culture from generation to generation, from father to son.

"Mandé," often used to describe Madou and his family, is a broad cultural designation of several ethnic groups in West Africa, including (though not exclusively) the Mandinka, Maninka (or "Malinke"), Sarakole, Bambara, and Dyula, residing primarily in Gambia, Senegal, Guinea, Mali, the northern regions of Ivory Coast, and the western regions of Burkina Faso.

The kora, arguably the most complex chordophone in African music, is a 21-stringed bridge-harp from West Africa. Madou, tutored by his father, began playing an eight-stringed kora at the age of three. From ages three to six, Madou accompanied his parents at weddings and baptisms, among other ceremonies. He played his first concert at the age of six at the Centre Culturel Français of Bobodioulasso, Burkina Faso with his father. In 1992, at age of ten, Madou made his first European tour. He continued to accompany his father up until Sidiki's very last performance in 1996 at the Festival Printemps des Cordes, or the Spring Festival of Strings, in Dakar. Although Madou has largely followed in the steps of his father, his style has been susceptible to new techniques and innovations. Today, he often claims that his older brother, Toumani Diabaté, who is also a distinguished kora player, is his master, helping him to understand the endless potential of the kora.

Since 1997, Madou has been playing lead kora with some of the most important West African singers and musicians, including Kandia Kouyaté, Baaba Maal, and Salif Keita, among others. He has performed at more than forty festivals and over one thousand concerts throughout Africa, North America, Europe, and Australia. Madou can also play the balafon (framed xylophone) and tamani (double-headed drum,) also of West African descent.

Madou is renowned for his extensive knowledge of traditional kora repertoire and command of both jazz sensibilities and foreign influences. His style is often associated with the "Jazz Manding" music movement developing Mali today. While Madou prides himself on preserving the tradition and legacy of the kora, he is also known for having diverged from his father's style, inspired by afro-Latin groups like the Rail Band (also called the Super Rail Band, or Bamako Rail Band,) in addition to his brother's music (particularly Toumani's Bembeya Jazz).

In 2004, Madou received a degree in music from the Institut National des Arts (INA), in Bamako, Mali. Madou now resides in with his wife, singer Safiatou Diabaté.

== Diabaté legacy ==
The Diabaté family has produced 72 generations of kora players and jalis, the Malian counterpart of griots, or West African historians. A jali transmits the ancient oral history of western Africa through poetry and praise songs, and, like the Diabaté family, they are often also musicians.

Madou's father, the late Sidiki Diabaté, is widely known as "The King of Kora." Sidiki was from The Gambia, but is family background is from Mali. Sidiki migrated to Mali during the years between World War II and 1961. His songs' nationalist message became a powerful voice in the call for Independence. "Kaira," one of Sidiki's more popular songs, shares its name with a collective of young jalis in the Kita region of western Mali. Although the group was banned by the colonial French, the song remained popular and encouraged support for the Malian branch of the African Democratic Rally, led by the first president of independent Mali, Modibo Keita.

Sidiki Diabaté also played an important role in the preservation of Malian and Mandé history and culture. Sidiki performed with L'Ensemble Instrumental National du Mali, who performed Mandingo music and was one of West Africa's first national acoustic bands. They received the first prize at the Festival des Arts Nègres in Dakar in 1966, and a gold-medal at the Pan-African Cultural Festival at Algiers in 1969. Sidiki was also featured as a soloist on the first recording to feature the kora exclusively. The recording, called "Ancient Strings," brought together Mali's most respected korists; in addition to Sidiki Diabaté, Djelimadi Sissoko, Batrou Sekou Kouyate and N'fa Diabaté.

Mamadou Sidiki Diabaté's brother, Toumani Diabaté, is also a part of the family's growing musical legacy. Toumani was the first kora player to win a Grammy Award in 2006 and he has collaborated with musicians from all over the world, including Taj Mahal, Ketama, and Roswell Rudd.

Toumani has led many bands, including the Symmetric Orchestra, which mixes both modern western and traditional Malian styles. The Symmetric Orchestra is a large "big band" ensemble whose sound is reminiscent of Mali's path-forging national, regional and municipal orchestras of the 1960s and 70s. The band features both western instruments (electric guitars, drum kits and synthesizers) and traditional Malian instruments (such as the kora, jembe, balafon, and ngoni). Toumani comments, "The Symmetric Orchestra reflects the spirit of Mali's new democracy since 1992 – a spirit of equality, and creativity. There's a public in Mali today that love traditional music – griot music – but not the griot milieu. With the Symmetric, they feel free to enjoy this music without the obligations of tradition. And this gives us the freedom to present the tradition in new ways."

The Symmetric Orchestra is just one example of Toumani's fusion of tradition and innovation; Toumani's album New Ancient Strings (1999) is a response to his father's classic recording Ancient Strings. Lucy Durán writes that the album "is rooted in the timeless classical tradition of the Mali that was once, during the pre-colonial era, played at the courts of kings and emperors; but it is reworked to the contemporary styles that are currently in favour in Bamako – the hot-house of many of West Africa's finest musicians".

Sidiki and Toumani both have had distinguished and ground-breaking careers as musicians and the Diabaté family's legacy not only continues with Toumani and Madou, but also Sidiki Diabaté, Toumani's son, who is also a kora player. Sidiki is the real-life inspiration for the children's book Sidikiba's Kora Lesson, by Ryan Thomas Skinner.

== The Mandé Sound ==
The Mandé Sound, with which Mamadou Sidiki Diabaté is often associated, is one of several regional varieties of Afro-pop. Mandé is the broad cultural designation of several ethnic groups in West Africa, including (though not exclusively) the Mandinka or Malinke, Sarakole, Bambara, and Dyula, residing primarily in Gambia, Senegal, Guinea, Mali, the northern regions of Ivory Coast, and the western regions of Burkina Faso.

The Mandé Sound is characterized by samba rhythms, parallel thirds vocal harmony, and smooth, virtuosic electric guitar leads. It makes use of modal scales (particularly common is the Lydian mode, with a raised fourth, taken from traditional music). This style frequently makes use of traditional Mandé instruments such as the kora, ngoni (plucked lute,) and balafon (framed xylophone). Although women figure prominently as vocal soloists in traditional Mandé music, they are less likely to be figured in the Mandé Sound. The repertoire is heavily drawn from traditional jali music, either in popular arrangements of traditional songs or in new compositions in a traditional melodic style.

The Mandé Sound originated in Guinea with the founding of Africa's first national dance troupe (which included musicians,) founded by Keita Fodeba, with the intention of bringing West African music to a global stage. In 1958, and several years after, Guinea has celebrated its independence by producing albums of traditional and popular performers through Tempo Records of Hollywood. In 1970, Guinea pioneered the production of African popular music by establishing the first African label, Syliphone. By 1985, Syliphone had released over 80 LP discs of popular bands from all over Guinea boasting the Mandé Sound. Madou's brother, Toumani Diabaté was first recorded by this label with his ever-popular group Bembeya Jazz National.

Mamadou Sidiki Diabaté, along with his father Sidiki Diabaté and Toumani Diabaté, are one of a number of more traditionally-oriented kora players associated with the Mandé Sound.

== Bibliography ==
- Belcher, Stephen. "Review: Empire of the Mind: New Work in Mande Studies." Research in African Literatures 34.4 (2003): 129-44. JSTOR. Web. 5 December 2010.
- Evans, David. "Review: African Music." The Journal of American Folklore 90.356 (1977): 223-36. JSTOR. Web. 3 December 2010.
- Mali Latino - A Brand New Project Featuring Madou Sidiki Diabaté, Ahmed Fofana and Alex Wilson 9 December 2010
- Knight, Roderic. "The Mande Sound: African Popular Music on Records." Ethnomusicology 33.2 (1989): 371-76. JSTOR. Web. 4 December 2010.
- Skinner, R.. Artistiya: Popular music and personhood in postcolonial Bamako, Mali. Diss. Columbia University, 2009. Dissertations & Theses @ Columbia University, ProQuest. Web. 5 December 2010.
- "Mamadou Sidiki Diabate" KSK RECORDS. Web. 3 December 2010.
