= West Africa =

Westernmost region of the African continent

Coordinates: 12°N 3°E

- Western Africa (UN subregion)
- Area: 6,142,700 km^{2} (2,371,700 sq mi) (7th)
- Population: ▲418,544,337 (2021 est.) (3rd) ▲468,184,000 (2025 est.)
- Density: 76.21/km^{2} (197.4/sq mi)
- Demonym: West African
- Countries: Sovereign states (16): Benin; Burkina Faso; Cape Verde; Gambia; Ghana; Guinea; Guinea-Bissau; Ivory Coast; Liberia; Mauritania; Mali; Niger; Nigeria; Senegal; Sierra Leone; Togo
- Dependencies: Saint Helena, Ascension and Tristan da Cunha
- Time zones: UTC−1 to UTC+1
- Major Regional Organizations: Economic Community of West African States (ECOWAS; established 1975)
- Total GDP (PPP): ▲$3.62 trillion (2026) (13th)
- GDP (PPP) per capita: ▲$7,582 (2026)
- Total GDP (nominal): ▲$848.06 billion (2026)
- Total GDP (nominal) per capita: ▲$1,778 (2026)
- Currency: List: (Ghana) Cedi (GHS); (The Gambia) Dalasi (GMD); (Guinea) Franc (GNF); (Liberia) Dollar (LRD); (Mauritania) Ouguiya (MRU); (Nigeria) Naira (NGN); (Saint Helena) Pound (SHP); (Sierra Leone) Leone (SLL); W. African CFA franc (XOF)
- Largest cities: List: (Nigeria) Lagos; (Ivory Coast) Abidjan; (Mali) Bamako; (Ghana) Accra; (Nigeria) Kano; (Senegal) Dakar; (Nigeria) Abuja; (Nigeria) Ibadan; (Burkina Faso) Ouagadougou; (Ghana) Kumasi
- UN M.49 code: 011 – West Africa; 202 – Sub-Saharan Africa; 002 – Africa; 001 – World

Regions of the African Union: Northern Western Southern Eastern Central Note that Ceuta and Melilla in Northern Africa are parts of Spain.

West Africa, also known as Western Africa, is the westernmost region of Africa. The United Nations defines Western Africa as the 16 countries of Benin, Burkina Faso, Cape Verde, The Gambia, Ghana, Guinea, Guinea-Bissau, Ivory Coast, Liberia, Mali, Mauritania, Niger, Nigeria, Senegal, Sierra Leone, and Togo, as well as Saint Helena, Ascension and Tristan da Cunha (a United Kingdom Overseas Territory). As of 2021, the population of West Africa is estimated at 419 million, and approximately 382 million in 2017, of which 189.7 million were female and 192.3 million male. The region is one of the fastest growing in Africa, both demographically and economically. West Africa is a culturally and demographically diverse region, home to many ethnic groups, including Hausa, Yoruba, Igbo, Fulani, Akan, Mandé, Wolof, Songhai, Kanuri, Zarma and Tuareg. The most common religions practiced in the region are Islam, Christianity and traditional African religions.

Historically, West Africa was home to several powerful states and empires that controlled regional trade routes, including the Mali and Gao Empires. Positioned at a crossroads of trade between North Africa and South Sahel Africa, the region supplied goods such as gold, ivory, and advanced iron-working. During European exploration, local economies were incorporated into the Atlantic slave trade, which expanded existing systems of slavery. Even after the end of the slave trade in the early 19th century, colonial powers – especially France and Britain — continued to exploit the region through colonial relationships. For example, they continued exporting extractive goods like cocoa, coffee, tropical timber, and mineral resources. Since gaining independence, several West African nations, such as the Ivory Coast, Ghana, Nigeria and Senegal – have taken active roles in regional and global economies. Nigeria, with a population of more than 242 million, is the most populous country in Africa, and the world's sixth-most populous country, and its economy is the largest in the region and one of the largest in Africa along with Egypt and South Africa. By contrast, other countries in the area, such as Niger and Mali, have among the lowest human development index in the world.

West Africa has a rich ecology, with significant biodiversity across various regions. Its climate is shaped by the dry Sahara to the north and east – producing the Harmattan winds — and by the Atlantic Ocean to the south and west, which brings seasonal monsoons. This climatic mix creates a range of biomes, from tropical forests to drylands, supporting species such as pangolin, rhinoceros, and elephant. Several countries in West Africa are crossed by the Sahel, a transition zone between the more humid Sudanian savannas to its south and the drier Sahara to the north. However, West Africa's environment faces major threats due to deforestation, biodiversity loss, overfishing, pollution from mining, plastics, and climate change.

== History ==
The history of West Africa can be divided into five major periods: first, its prehistory, in which the first human settlers arrived, developed agriculture, and made contact with peoples to the north; the second, the Iron Age empires that consolidated both intra-Africa, and extra-Africa trade, and developed centralized states; third, major polities flourished, which would undergo an extensive history of contact with non-Africans; fourth, the colonial period, in which Great Britain and France controlled nearly the entire region; and fifth, the post-independence era, in which the current nations were formed.

=== Prehistory ===
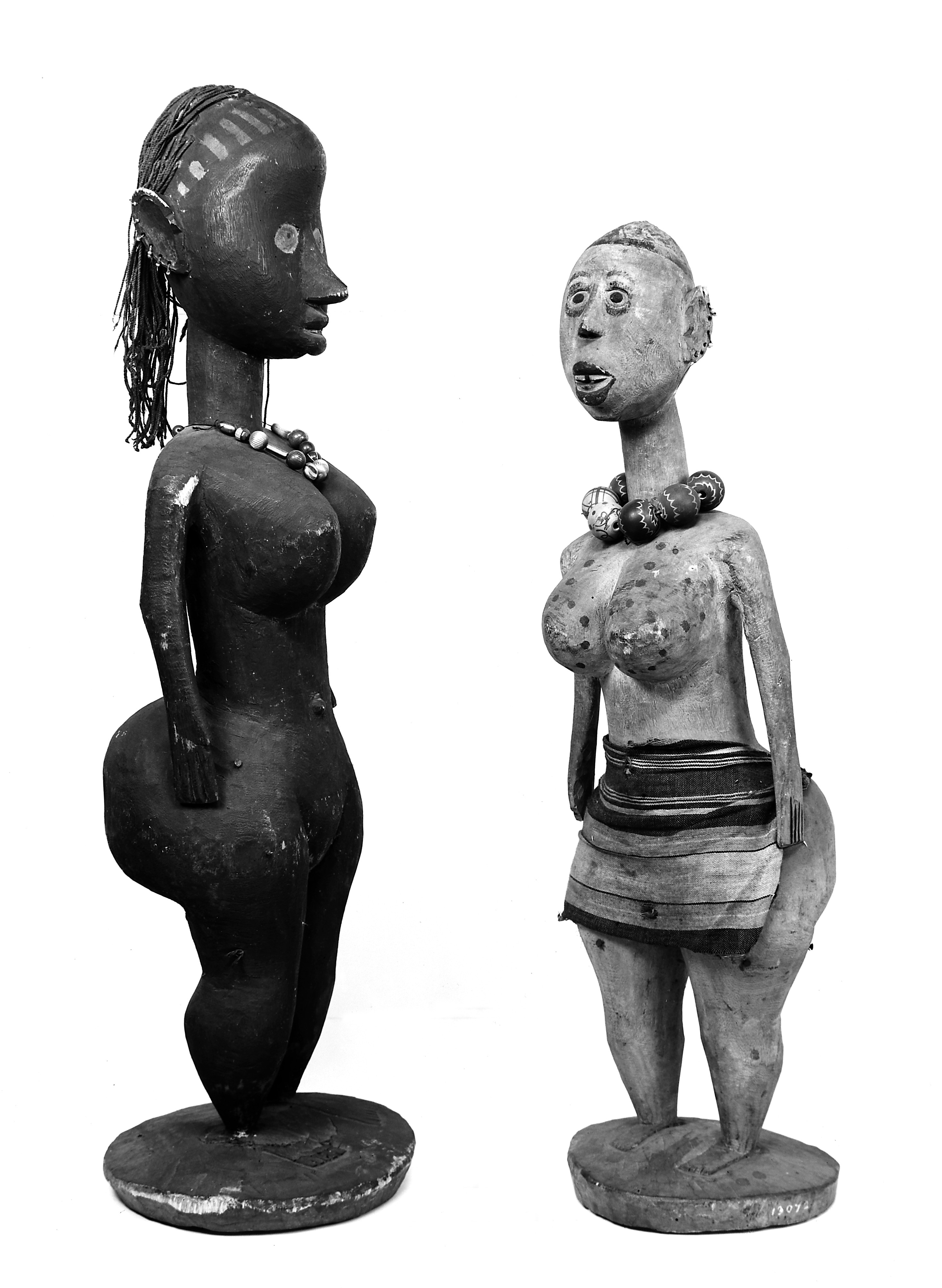
Representations of West African hunter-gatherers from the Dahomey region of Benin

West African populations were considerably mobile and interacted with one another throughout the population history of West Africa. Acheulean tool-using archaic humans may have dwelled throughout West Africa since at least between 780,000 BP and 126,000 BP (Middle Pleistocene). During the Pleistocene, Middle Stone Age peoples (e.g., Iwo Eleru people, possibly Aterians), who dwelled throughout West Africa between MIS 4 and MIS 2, were gradually replaced by incoming Late Stone Age peoples, who migrated into West Africa as an increase in humid conditions resulted in the subsequent expansion of the West African forest. West African hunter-gatherers occupied western Central Africa (e.g., Shum Laka) earlier than 32,000 BP, dwelled throughout coastal West Africa by 12,000 BP, and migrated northward between 12,000 BP and 8000 BP as far as Mali, Burkina Faso, and Mauritania.

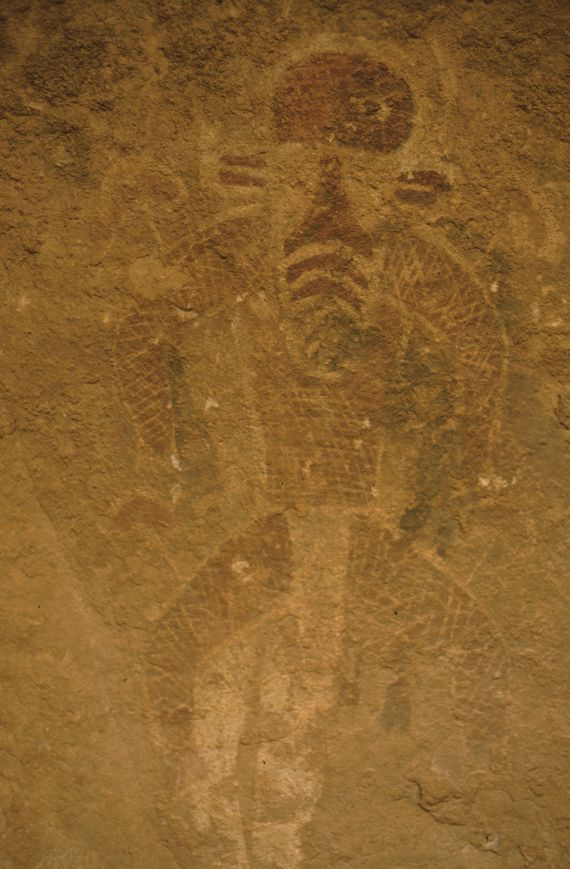
Round Head figure wearing a Barbary sheep-styled mask

During the Holocene, Niger-Congo speakers independently created pottery in Ounjougou, Mali – the earliest pottery in Africa – by at least 9400 BCE, and along with their pottery, as well as wielding independently invented bows and arrows, migrated into the Central Sahara, which became their primary region of residence by 10,000 BP. The emergence and expansion of ceramics in the Sahara may be linked with the origin of Round Head and Kel Essuf rock art, which occupy rockshelters in the same regions (e.g., Djado, Acacus, Tadrart). Hunters in the Central Sahara farmed, stored, and cooked undomesticated central Saharan flora, underwent domestication of antelope, and domesticated and shepherded Barbary sheep. After the Kel Essuf Period and Round Head Period of the Central Sahara, the Pastoral Period followed. Some of the hunter-gatherers who created the Round Head rock art may have adopted pastoral culture, and others may have not. As a result of increasing aridification of the Green Sahara, Central Saharan hunter-gatherers and cattle herders may have used seasonal waterways as the migratory route taken to the Niger River and Chad Basin of West Africa. In 2000 BCE, "Thiaroye Woman", also known as the "Venus of Thiaroye", may have been the earliest statuette created in Sub-Saharan West Africa; it may have particularly been a fertility statuette, created in the region of Senegambia, and may be associated with the emergence of complexly organized pastoral societies in West Africa between 4000 BCE and 1000 BCE. Though possibly developed as early as 5000 BCE, Nsibidi may have also developed in 2000 BCE, as evidenced by depictions of the West African script on Ikom monoliths at Ikom, in Nigeria. Migration of Saharan peoples south of the Sahelian region resulted in seasonal interaction with and gradual absorption of West African hunter-gatherers, who primarily dwelt in the savannas and forests of West Africa. In West Africa, which may have been a major regional cradle in Africa for the domestication of crops and animals, Niger-Congo speakers domesticated the helmeted guineafowl between 5500 BP and 1300 BP; domestication of field crops occurred throughout various locations in West Africa, such as yams (d. praehensilis) in the Niger River basin between eastern Ghana and western Nigeria (northern Benin), rice (oryza glaberrima) in the Inner Niger Delta region of Mali, pearl millet (cenchrus americanus) in northern Mali and Mauritania, and cowpeas in northern Ghana. After having persisted as late as 1000 BP, or some period of time after 1500 CE, remaining West African hunter-gatherers, many of whom dwelt in the forest-savanna region, were ultimately acculturated and admixed into the larger groups of West African agriculturalists, akin to the migratory Bantu-speaking agriculturalists and their encounters with Central African hunter-gatherers.

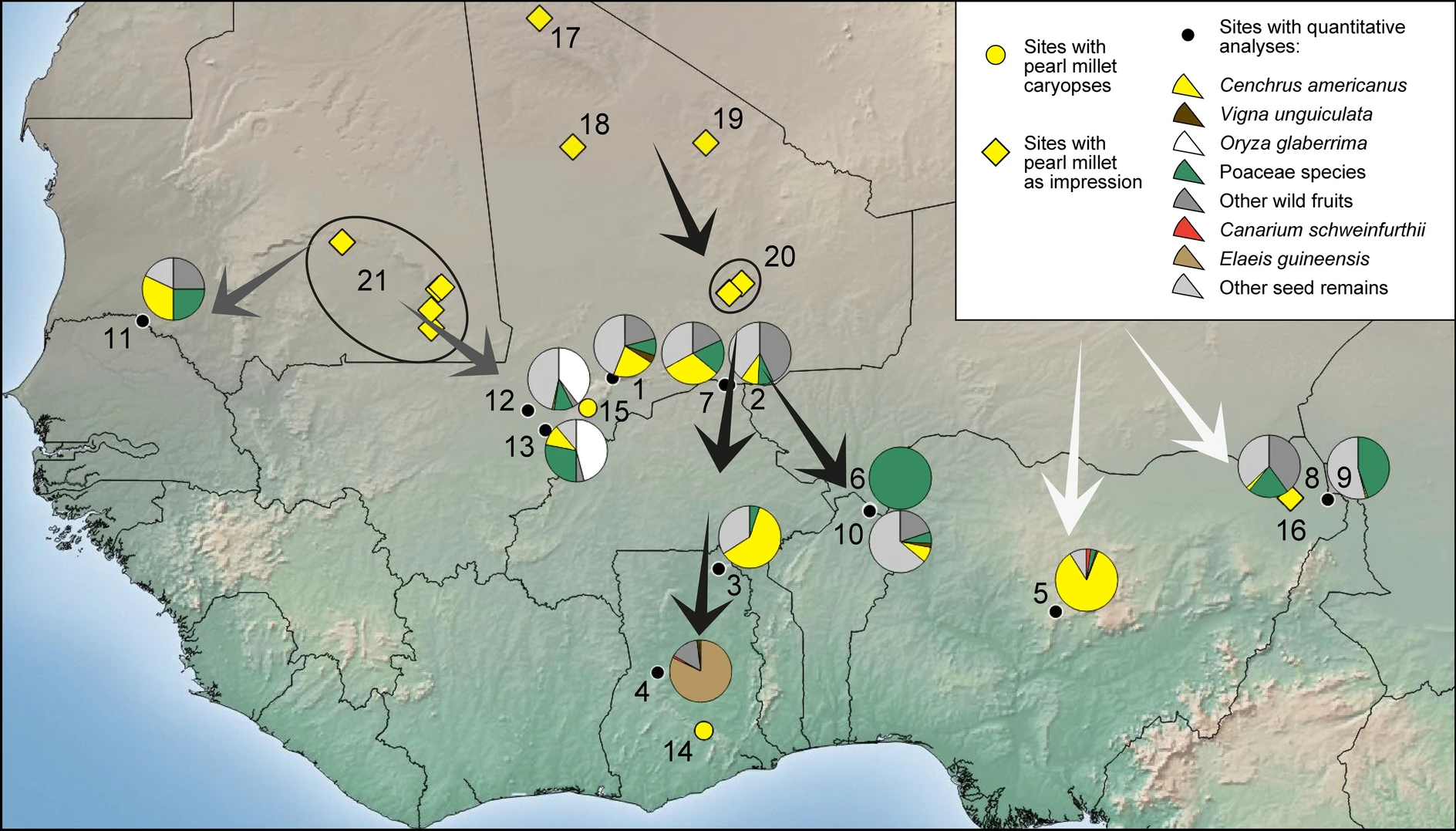
West African sites with archaeobotanical remains from third to first millennium cal bc. The arrows indicate directions of pearl millet diffusion into sub-Saharan West Africa.

=== Empires ===
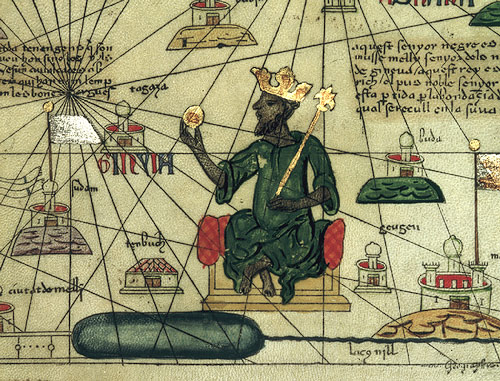
Mansa Musa depicted holding a gold nugget from a 1395 map of Africa and Europe

The development of the region's economy allowed more centralized states and civilizations to form, beginning with Dhar Tichitt that began in 1600 B.C. followed by Djenné-Djenno beginning in 300 B.C. This was then succeeded by the Ghana Empire that first flourished roughly between the 2nd and 12th centuries C.E., which later gave way to the Mali Empire. In current-day Mauritania, there exist archaeological sites in the towns of Tichit and Oualata that were initially constructed around 2000 B.C., and were found to have originated from the Soninke branch of the Mandé peoples. Also, based on the archaeology of the city of Kumbi Saleh in modern-day Mauritania, the Mali empire came to dominate much of the region until its defeat by Almoravid invaders in 1052.

Three great kingdoms were identified in Bilad al-Sudan by the ninth century. They included Ghana, Gao and Kanem.

The Sosso Empire sought to fill the void but was defeated (c. 1240) by the Mandinka forces of Sundiata Keita, founder of the new Mali Empire. The Mali Empire continued to flourish for several centuries, most particularly under Sundiata's grandnephew Musa I, before a succession of weak rulers led to its collapse under Mossi, Tuareg and Songhai invaders. In the 15th century, the Songhai would form a new dominant state based on Gao, in the Songhai Empire, under the leadership of Sonni Ali and Askia Mohammed.

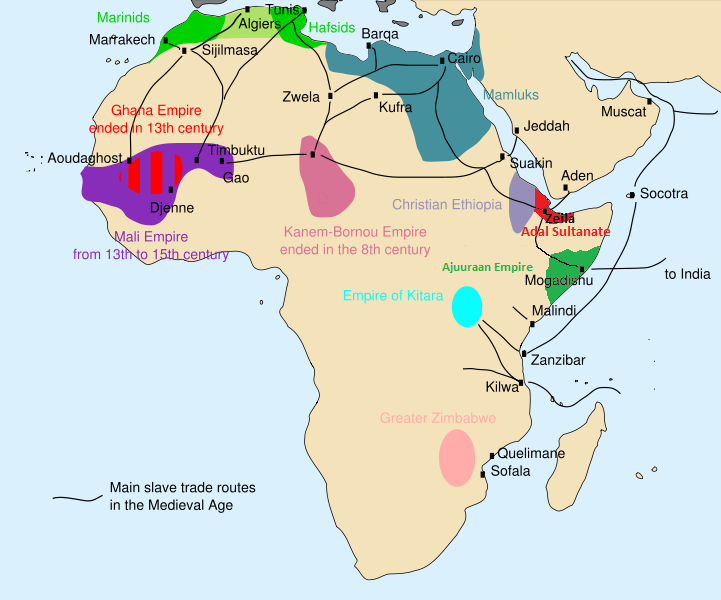
13th-century Africa – map of the main trade routes and states, kingdoms and empires

Meanwhile, south of Sudan, strong city-states arose in Igboland, such as the 10th-century Kingdom of Nri, which helped birth the arts and customs of the Igbo people, Bono state in the 11th century, which gave birth to the numerous Akan States, while Ife rose to prominence around the 12th century. Further east, Oyo arose as the dominant Yoruba state and the Aro Confederacy as a dominant Igbo state in modern-day Nigeria.

The Kingdom of Nri was a West African medieval state in present-day southeastern Nigeria and a subgroup of the Igbo people. The Kingdom of Nri was unusual in the history of world government in that its leader exercised no military power over his subjects. The kingdom existed as a sphere of religious and political influence over a third of Igboland and was administered by a priest-king called an Eze Nri. The Eze Nri managed trade and diplomacy on behalf of the Nri people and possessed divine authority in religious matters.

The Oyo Empire was a Yoruba empire of what is today Western, North Central Nigeria and Southern Republic of Benin. Established in the 14th century, the Oyo Empire grew to become one of the largest West African states. It rose through the outstanding organizational skills of the Yoruba, wealth gained from trade and its powerful cavalry. The Oyo Empire was the most politically important state in the region from the mid-17th to the late 18th century, holding sway not only over most of the other kingdoms in Yorubaland, but also over nearby African states, notably the Fon Kingdom of Dahomey in the modern Republic of Benin to the west.

The Benin Empire was a post-classical empire located in what is now southern Nigeria. Its capital was Edo, now known as Benin City, Edo. It should not be confused with the modern-day country called Benin, formerly called Dahomey. The Benin Empire was "one of the oldest and most highly developed states in the coastal hinterland of West Africa, dating perhaps to the eleventh century CE". The Benin Empire was governed by a sovereign Emperor with hundreds of thousands of soldiers and a powerful council rich in resources, wealth, ancient science and technology with cities described as beautiful and large as Haarlem. "Olfert Dapper, a Dutch writer, describing Benin in his book Description of Africa (1668) ". Its craft was the most adored and treasured bronze casting in the history of Africa. It was annexed by the British Empire in 1897 during the invasion and scramble of Africa.

=== European contact and slave trade ===
West Africa c. 1875

Portuguese traders began establishing settlements along the coast in 1445, followed by the French, English, Spanish, Danish and Dutch; the African slave trade began not long after, which over the following centuries would debilitate the region's economy and population. The slave trade also encouraged the formation of states such as the Bono state, Bambara Empire and Dahomey, whose economic activities include but not limited to exchanging slaves for European firearms.

=== Colonialism ===
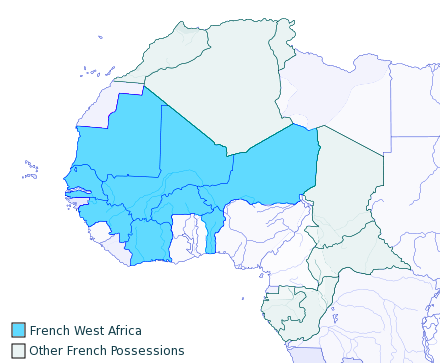
French in West Africa c. 1913

In the early 19th century, a series of Fulani reformist jihads swept across Western Africa. The most notable include Usman dan Fodio's Fulani Empire, which replaced the Hausa city-states, Seku Amadu's Massina Empire, which defeated the Bambara, and El Hadj Umar Tall's Toucouleur Empire, which briefly conquered much of modern-day Mali.

However, the French and British continued to advance in the Scramble for Africa, subjugating kingdom after kingdom. With the fall of Samory Ture's established Wassoulou Empire in 1898 and the Ashanti queen Yaa Asantewaa in 1902, most West African military resistance to colonial rule resulted in failure.

Part of the West African regions underwent an increase in the numeracy level throughout the 19th century. The reason for such a growth was predetermined by a number of factors. Namely, the peanut production and trade, which was boosted by the demand of the colonial states. Importantly, the rise of numeracy was higher in the regions which were less hierarchical and had less dependence on the slavery trade (e.g. Sine and Salum). Whereas areas with the opposite trends illustrated opposite tendencies (e.g. central and northern Senegal). Those patterns were further even more stimulated by the French colonial campaign.

Britain controlled the Gambia, Sierra Leone, Ghana, and Nigeria throughout the colonial era, while France unified Senegal, Guinea, Mali, Burkina Faso, Benin, Ivory Coast, and Niger into French West Africa. Portugal founded the colony of Guinea-Bissau, while Germany claimed Togoland, but was forced to divide it between France and Britain following First World War due to the Treaty of Versailles. Only Liberia retained its independence, at the price of major territorial concessions.

=== Postcolonial era ===
Following World War II, nationalist movements arose across West Africa. In 1957, Ghana, under Kwame Nkrumah, became the first West African colony to achieve its independence, followed the next year by France's colonies (Guinea in 1958 under the leadership of President Ahmed Sekou Touré); by 1974, West Africa's nations were entirely autonomous.

Since independence, many West African nations have been submerged under political instability, with notable civil wars in Nigeria, Sierra Leone, Liberia, and Ivory Coast, and a succession of military coups in Ghana and Burkina Faso.

Since the end of colonialism, the region has been the stage for some brutal conflicts, including:

- Nigerian Civil War
- First Liberian Civil War
- Second Liberian Civil War
- Guinea-Bissau Civil War
- Ivorian Civil War
- Sierra Leone Rebel War
- Mali War

== Geopolitical division ==
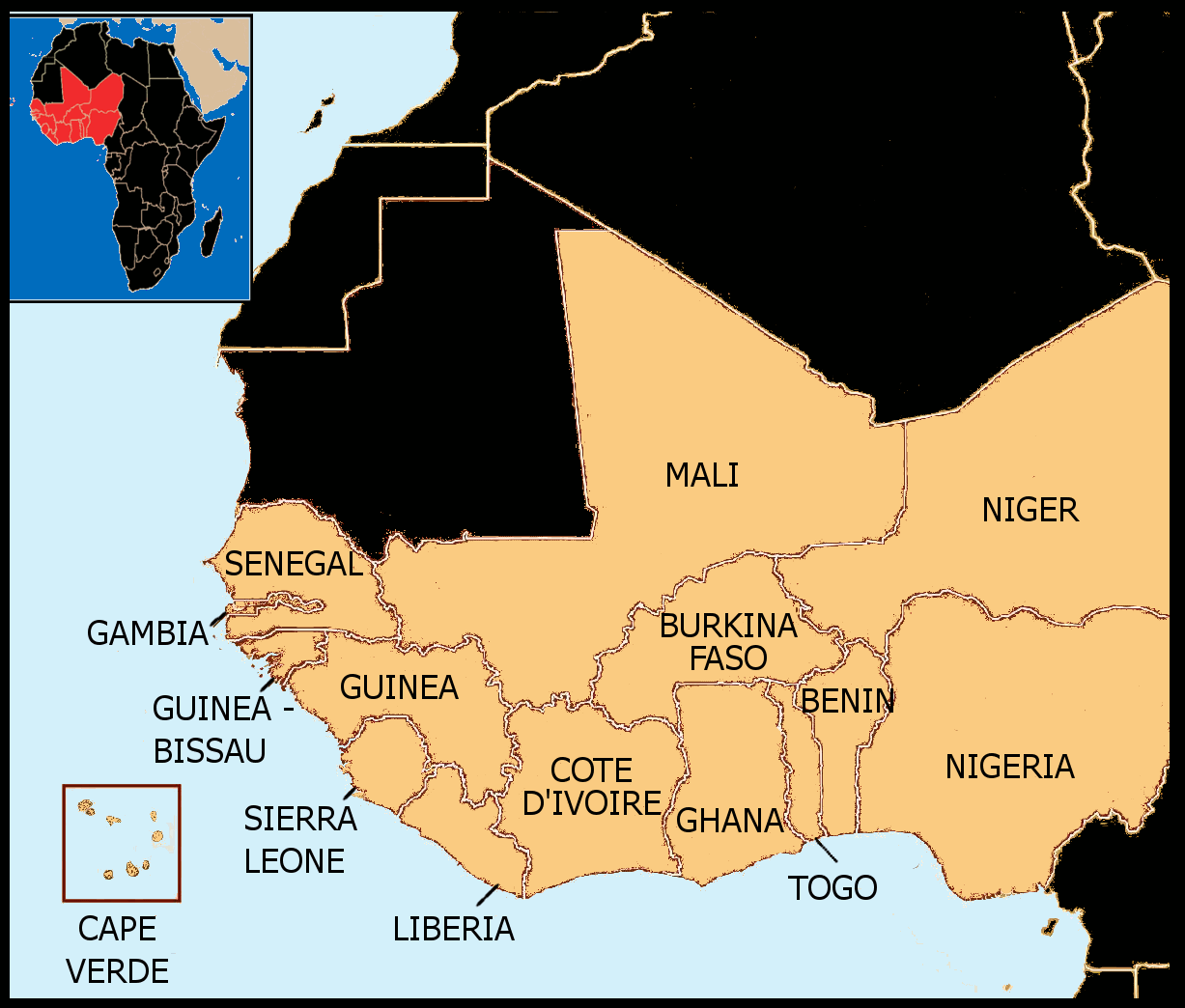
Geopolitical States of West Africa; * Benin * Burkina Faso * Cape Verde * Ivory Coast * The Gambia / * Ghana * Guinea * Guinea-Bissau * Liberia * Mali / * Niger * Nigeria * Senegal * Sierra Leone * Togo

Geopolitically, the United Nations definition of subregion Western Africa includes the preceding states with the addition of Mauritania (which withdrew from ECOWAS in 1999), comprising an area of approximately 6.1 million square km. The UN region also includes the United Kingdom Overseas Territory of Saint Helena, Ascension and Tristan da Cunha in the south Atlantic Ocean.

=== Area ===
Africa map depicting geographic regions
- The Sahara The Sahel Sub-Saharan Africa

In the United Nations scheme of African regions, the region of Western Africa includes 16 states and the United Kingdom Overseas Territory of Saint Helena, Ascension and Tristan da Cunha: Mali, Burkina Faso, Senegal and the Niger are mostly in the Sahel, a transition zone between the Sahara Desert and the Sudanian Savanna; Benin, Ivory Coast, The Gambia, Ghana, Guinea, Guinea-Bissau, Liberia, Sierra Leone, Togo and Nigeria compose most of Guinea, the traditional name for the area near the Gulf of Guinea; Mauritania lies in the Maghreb, the northwestern region of Africa that has historically been inhabited by West African groups such as the Fulani, Soninke, Wolof, Serer and Toucouleur people, along with Arab-Berber Maghrebi people such as the Tuareg; Cape Verde is an island country in the Atlantic Ocean; and Saint Helena, Ascension and Tristan da Cunha consists of eight main islands located in four different parts of the Atlantic. Due to Mauritania's increasingly close ties to the Arab World and its 1999 withdrawal from the Economic Community of West African States (ECOWAS), in modern times it is often considered, especially in Africa, as now part of western North Africa.

=== List of countries ===
- Benin
- Burkina Faso
- Cape Verde
- Ivory Coast
- The Gambia
- Ghana
- Guinea
- Guinea-Bissau
- Liberia
- Mali
- Mauritania
- Niger
- Nigeria
- Senegal
- Sierra Leone
- Togo

=== Cities ===
Major and principal cities in West Africa include, geographically eastward:

- Dakar, Senegal
- Touba, Senegal
- Serrekunda, The Gambia
- Bissau, Guinea-Bissau
- Conakry, Guinea
- Freetown, Sierra Leone
- Monrovia, Liberia
- Bamako, Mali
- Abidjan, Ivory Coast
- Yamoussoukro, Ivory Coast
- Bouaké, Ivory Coast
- Ouagadougou, Burkina Faso
- Bobo-Dioulasso, Burkina Faso
- Accra, Ghana
- Kumasi, Ghana
- Lomé, Togo
- Cotonou, Benin
- Abuja, Nigeria
- Lagos, Nigeria
- Ibadan, Nigeria
- Port Harcourt, Nigeria
- Kano, Nigeria
- Benin City, Nigeria

== Environment ==
=== Nature ===
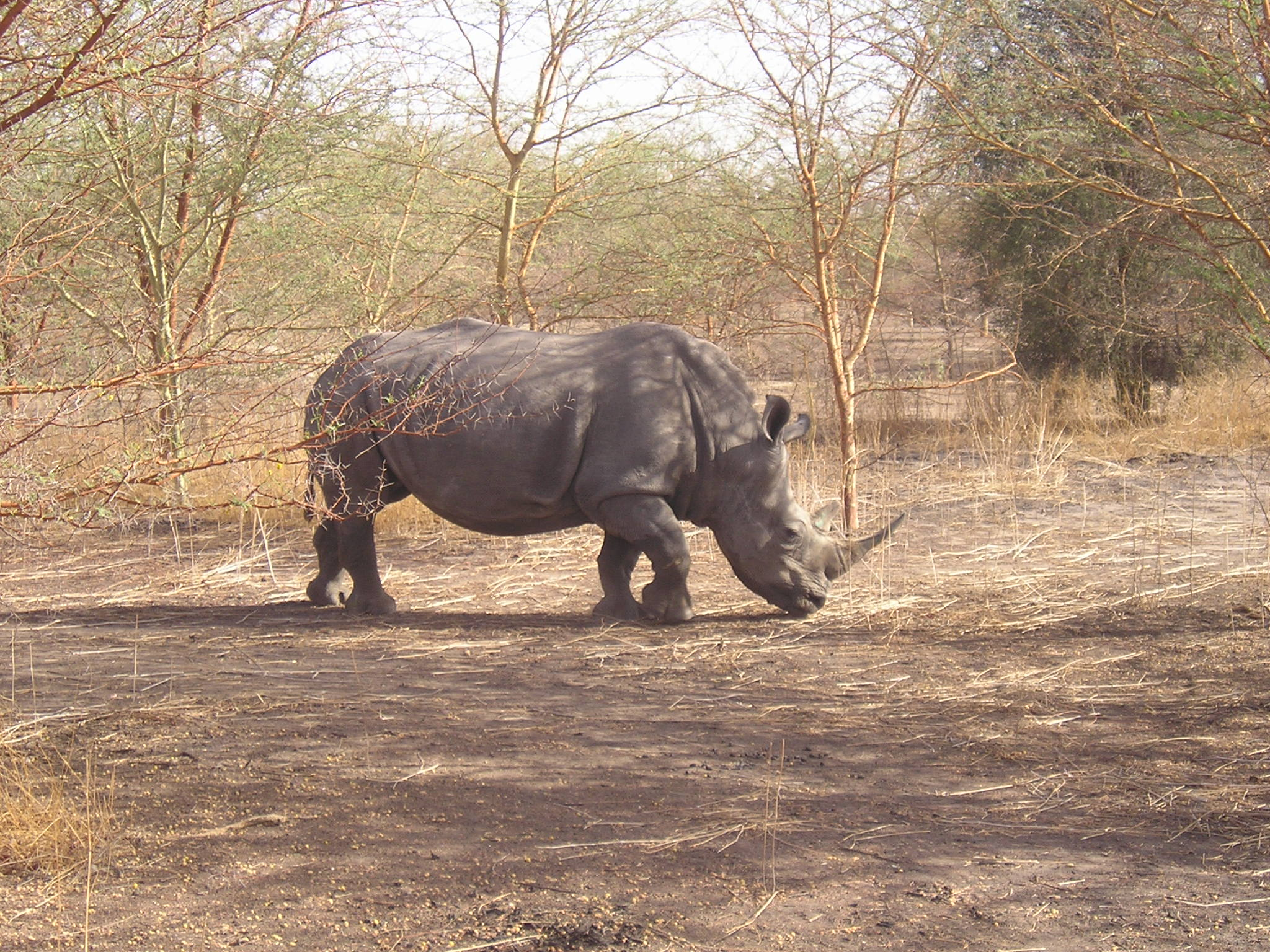
A rhinoceros in Bandia Nature Reserve, Senegal

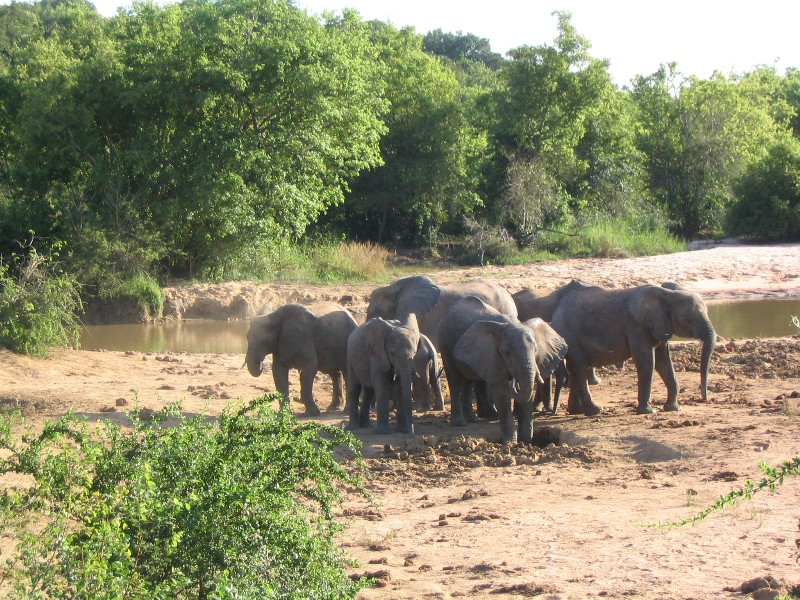
African bush elephants in Yankari National Park, Nigeria

Before European colonisation, West African countries such as those from the Senegambia region (Senegal and the Gambia) used to have a diverse wildlife including lions, hippopotamus, elephants, antelopes, leopards etc. However, during colonization, the European colonizers such as the French and British killed most of the wildlife particularly the lions, using their body parts as trophies. By the turn of the 20th century, the Senegambia region had lost most of its lion population and other exotic animals due to poaching. By the 1930s, the Gambian elephant population became extinct. That phenomenon was not only limited to the Senegambia region but affected much of West Africa as the region lost much of its "natural resources once tied so closely to its cultural identity. Poaching has stolen most of its wildlife." The British issued poaching licenses, and although they would later try to reverse the damage that had been done by attempting to preserve what was left of the local wildlife, but by that time, it was too late. During the 1930s, the elephant population in the Gold Coast was about 300, and Sierra Leone between 500 and 600. Although a small number of elephants survived in Nigeria, hunting, agricultural expansion and clearing of forest in that country drastically affected its wildlife population, particularly elephants.

Despite the historical damage that has been done to the region's wildlife populations, there are still some protected nature reserves within the region. Some of these include:

- The Bandia Nature Reserve in Senegal (French: Réserve de Bandia), animal life includes: giraffes, zebras, rhinos, a variety of antelopes, buffaloes, monkeys, crocodiles, tortoises. apes and a variety of exotic birds.
- The Yankari National Park in Nigeria, animal life includes: the African bush elephant, olive baboon, patas monkey, Tantalus monkey, roan antelope, western hartebeest, West African lion, African buffalo, waterbuck, bushbuck and hippopotamus.
1. The Ankasa Conservation Area in Ghana, animal life includes the elephant, bongo, leopard, chimpanzee, Diana Monkey, and other primates.
- The Mole National Park is Ghana's biggest wildlife refuge. It is home to over 83 mammal species including about 800 resident elephants, buffalo, hippos, and warthogs as well as various fauna and flora.

West Africa is also home to several baobab trees and other plant life. Some baobab trees are several centuries old and form part of the local folklore, for example, a mythical baobab tree named Ngoye njuli in Senegal which is regarded as a sacred site by the Serer. The tree itself is rather majestic and looks like a huge phallus and a deformed animal or thing is protruding from it. It is said to be the dwelling place of a pangool. Ngoye njuli is protected by the Senegalese authorities and attracts visitors. In West Africa, as in other parts of Africa where the baobab tree is found, the leaves are mixed with couscous and eaten, the bark of the tree is used to make ropes, and the fruit and seeds are used for drinks and oils.

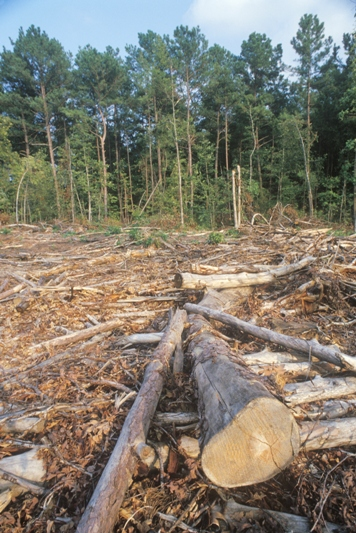
Deforestation in Nigeria

=== Deforestation ===
West Africa is greatly affected by deforestation and has one of the worst deforestation rate. Even "the beloved baobab tree" which is viewed as sacred by some West African cultures are under threat due to climate change, urbanization and population growth. "Huge swaths of forest are being razed to clear space for palm oil and cocoa plantations. Mangroves are being killed off by pollution. Even wispy acacias are hacked away for use in cooking fires to feed growing families." Nigeria, Liberia, Guinea, Ghana and the Ivory Coast, have lost large areas of their rainforest. In 2005, the Food and Agriculture Organization of the United Nations ranked Nigeria as the state with the worst deforestation rate in the entire world. Causes include logging, subsistence agriculture, and the collection of fuelwoods.

According to a ThoughtCo publication authored Steve Nix (2018), almost 90 percent of West Africa's original rainforest has been destroyed, and the rest is "heavily fragmented and in a degraded state, being poorly used."

=== Overfishing ===
Overfishing is a major issue in West Africa. Besides reducing fish stocks in the region, it also threatens food security and the livelihoods of many coastal communities that largely depend on artisanal fishing. The overfishing generally comes from foreign trawlers operating in the region.

To combat the overfishing, Greenpeace has recommended countries reduce the number of registered trawlers operating in African waters, increase the monitoring and control and set up regional fisheries organizations. Some steps have already been taken in the form of WARFP (the World Bank's West Africa Regional Fisheries Program which empowers west-African countries (i.e. Liberia, Sierra Leone, Cape Verde, and Senegal) with information, training and monitoring systems. Furthermore, Liberia enacted a fisheries regulations Act in 2010 and installed a satellite-based monitoring system and Senegal enacted a fisheries code in 2015. In Cape Verde, the fishermen communities of Palmiera and Santa Maria have organized themselves to protect fishing zones. Mozambique finally created a conservation area, including a coastline.

=== Geography and climate ===
West Africa, broadly defined to include the western portion of the Maghreb (Western Sahara, Morocco, Algeria, and Tunisia), occupies an area in excess of 6,140,000 km^{2}, or approximately one-fifth of Africa. The vast majority of this land is plains lying less than 300 meters above sea level, though isolated high points exist in numerous states along the southern shore of West Africa.

Western Afrotropical realm

Benin
Burkina Faso
The Gambia
Ghana
Guinea-Bissau
Guinea
Ivory Coast
Liberia
Mali
Mauritania
Nigeria
Niger
Senegal
Sierra Leone
Togo

State
The biostate
Location in Afrotropic

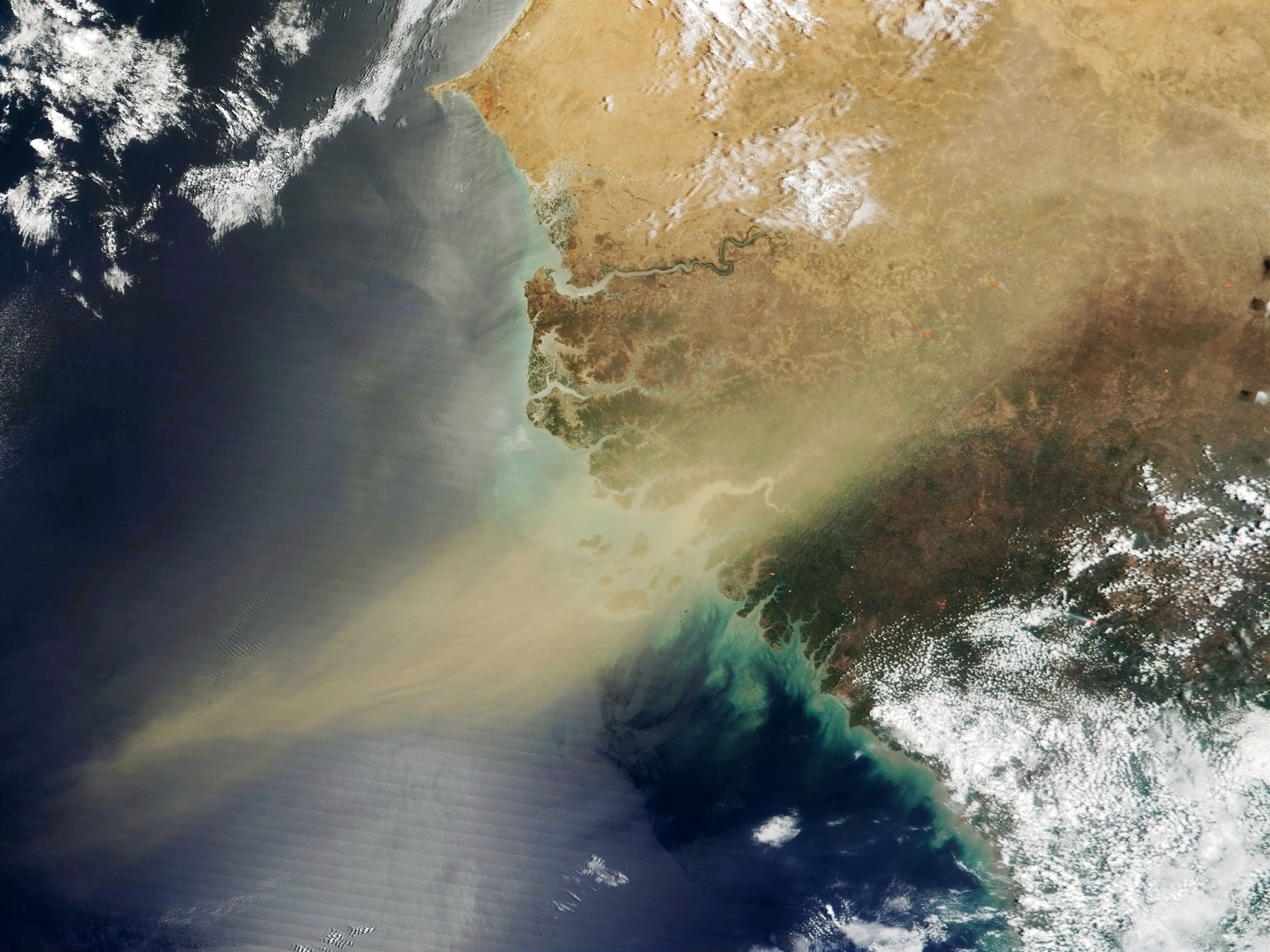
Satellite imagery from outer space of West Africa

The northern section of West Africa (narrowly defined to exclude the western Maghreb) is composed of semi-arid terrain known as Sahel, a transitional zone between the Sahara and the West Sudanian savanna. Forests form a belt between the savannas and the southern coast, ranging from 160 km to 240 km in width.

The northwest African region of Mauritania periodically suffers country-wide plagues of locusts which consume water, salt and crops on which the human population relies.

==== Background ====
West Africa is west of an imagined north–south axis lying close to 10° east longitude. The Atlantic Ocean forms the western as well as the southern borders of the West African region. The northern border is the Sahara Desert, with the Ranishanu Bend generally considered the northernmost part of the region. The eastern border is less precise, with some placing it at the Benue Trough, and others on a line running from Mount Cameroon to Lake Chad.

Colonial boundaries are reflected in the modern boundaries between contemporary West African states, cutting across ethnic and cultural lines, often dividing single ethnic groups between two or more states.

In contrast to most of Central, Southern, and Southeast Africa, West Africa is not populated by Bantu-speaking peoples.

=== Climate change ===
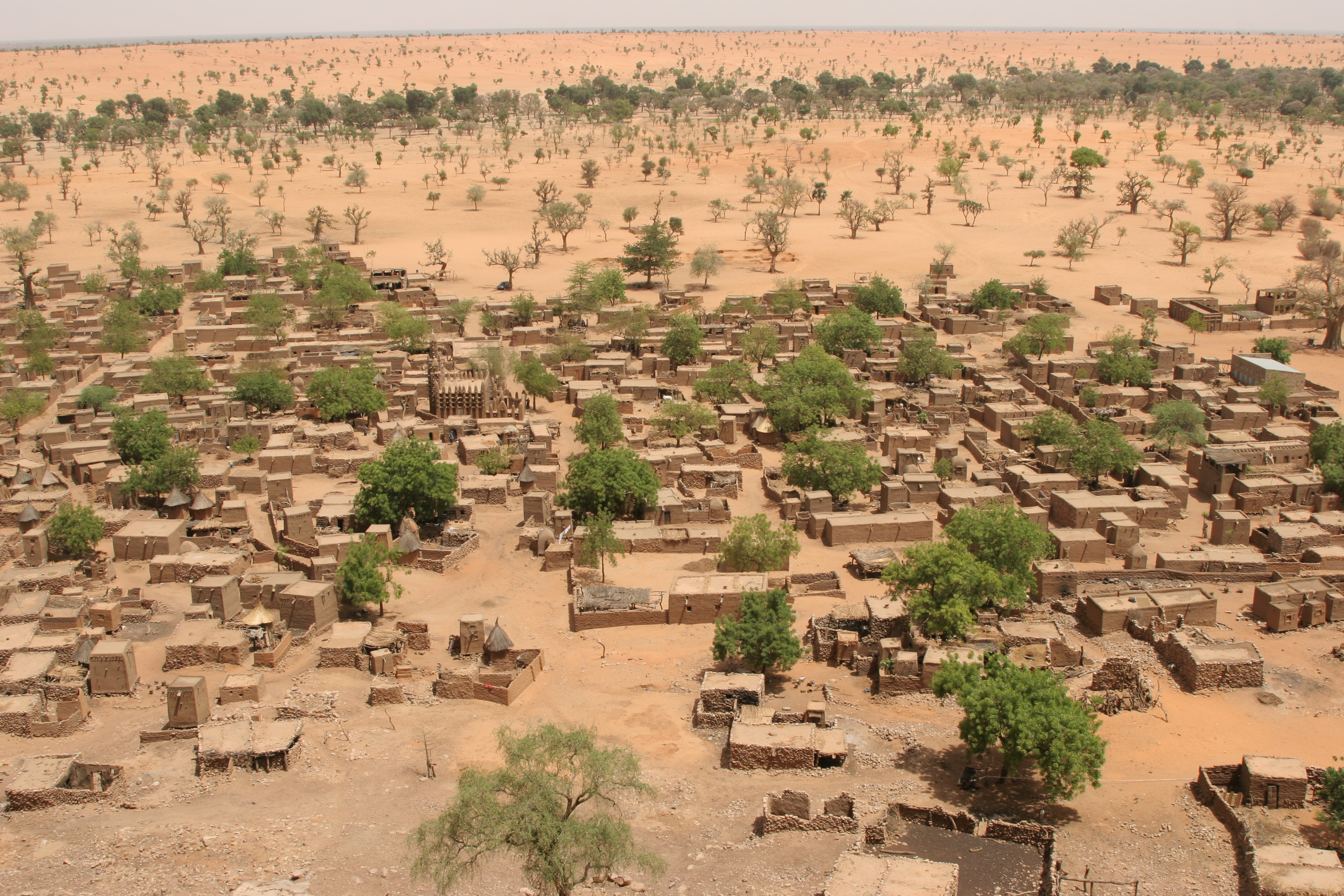
The Sahel has a hot semi-arid climate.

The West African region can be divided into four climatic sub-regions namely the Guinea Coast, Soudano-Sahel, Sahel (extending eastward to the Ethiopian border) and the Sahara, each with different climatic conditions. The seasonal cycle of rainfall is mainly driven by the south–north movement of the Inter-Tropical Convergence Zone (ITCZ) which is characterised by the confluence between moist southwesterly monsoon winds and the dry northeasterly Harmattan.

Based on the inter-annual rainfall variability, three main climatic periods have been observed over the Sahel: the wet period from 1950 to the early 1960s followed by a dry period from 1972 to 1990 and then the period from 1991 onwards which has seen a partial rainfall recovery. During the dry period, the Sahel experienced a number of particularly severe drought events, with devastating effects. The recent decades, have also witnessed a moderate increment in annual rainfall since the beginning of 1990s. However, total annual rainfall remains significantly below that observed during the 1950s.

Some have identified the two recent decades as a recovery period. Others refer to this as a period of "hydrological intensification" with much of the annual rainfall increase coming from more severe rain events and sometimes flooding rather than more frequent rainfall, or similarly other works underline the continuity of the drought even though the rainfall has increased. Since 1985, 54 percent of the population has been affected by five or more floods in the 17 Sahel region countries. In 2012, severe drought conditions in the Sahel were reported. Governments in the region responded quickly, launching strategies to address the issue.

The region is projected to experience changes in rainfall regime, with climate models suggesting that decreases in wet season rainfall are more likely in the western Sahel, and increases more likely in the central to east Sahel, although opposite trends cannot yet be ruled out. These trends will affect the frequency and severity of floods, droughts, desertification, sand and dust storms, desert locust plagues and water shortages.

However, irrespective of the changes in seasonal mean rain, the most intense storms are expected to become more intense, amplifying flood frequency. Enhanced carbon emissions and global warming may also lead to an increase in dry spells especially across the Guinea Coast associated with a reduction of the wet spells under both 1.5 °C and 2 °C global warming level.

Fifteen percent of the population of the Sahel region has also experienced a temperature increase of more than 1 °C from 1970 to 2010. The Sahel region, in particular, will experience higher average temperatures over the course of the 21st century and changes in rainfall patterns, according to the Intergovernmental Panel on Climate Change (IPCC).

== Transport ==
=== Rail transport ===
A Trans-ECOWAS project, established in 2007, plans to upgrade railways in this zone. One of the goals of the Economic Community of West African States (ECOWAS) is the development of an integrated railroad network. Aims include the extension of railways in member countries, the interconnection of previously isolated railways and the standardization of gauge, brakes, couplings, and other parameters. The first line would connect the cities and ports of Lagos, Cotonou, Lomé and Accra and would allow the largest container ships to focus on a smaller number of large ports, while efficiently serving a larger hinterland. This line connects 3 ft 6 in (1,067 mm) gauge and 1,000 mm (3 ft 3 3/8 in) metre gauge systems, which would require four rail dual gauge, which can also provide standard gauge.

=== Road transport ===
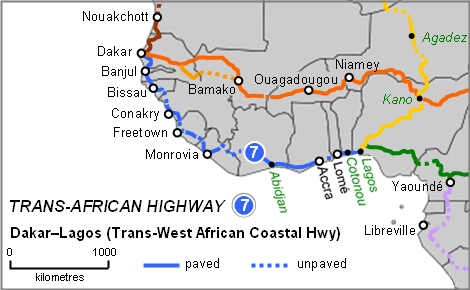

The Trans–West African Coastal Highway is a transnational highway project to link 12 West African coastal states, from Mauritania in the north-west of the region to Nigeria in the east, with feeder roads already existing to two landlocked countries, Mali and Burkina Faso.

The eastern end of the highway terminates at Lagos, Nigeria. Economic Community of West African States (ECOWAS) consider its western end to be Nouakchott, Mauritania, or to be Dakar, Senegal, giving rise to these alternative names for the road:

- Nouakchott–Lagos Highway
- Lagos–Nouakchott Highway
- Dakar–Lagos Highway
- Lagos–Dakar Highway
- Trans-African Highway 7 in the Trans-African Highway network

=== Air transport ===
The capitals' airports include:

- Cadjehoun Airport (COO) International; Cotonou, Benin
- Ouagadougou Airport (OUA); Ouagadougou, Burkina Faso
- Amílcar Cabral International Airport (SID); Praia, Cape Verde
- Banjul International Airport (BJL) International; Banjul, Gambia
- Accra International Airport (ACC); Accra; Ghana
- Conakry International Airport (CKY); Conakry, Guinea
- Osvaldo Vieira International Airport (OXB); Bissau, Guinea-Bissau
- Port Bouet Airport (ABJ); Abidjan, Ivory Coast
- Roberts International Airport (ROB); Monrovia, Liberia
- Bamako–Sénou International Airport (BKO); Bamako, Mali
- Nouakchott–Oumtounsy International Airport (NKC); Nouakchott, Mauritania
- Diori Hamani International Airport (NIM); Niamey, Niger
- Murtala Muhammed International Airport (LOS); Lagos, Nigeria
- Saint Helena Airport; Jamestown, Saint Helena
- Blaise Diagne International Airport (DSS); Dakar, Senegal
- Lungi International Airport (FNA); Freetown, Sierra Leone
- Lomé–Tokoin Airport (LFW); Lomé, Togo

Of the sixteen, the most important hub and entry point to West Africa are Accra International Airport, and Murtala Muhammed International Airport, offering many international connections.

== Health ==
West Africa has made considerable improvement in the health outcomes of its populations, despite the challenges posed by pervasive poverty, epidemic diseases, and food insecurity. The traditional communicable diseases of HIV/AIDS, malaria, and tuberculosis are still the major reasons for mortality. Primary health care is the best answer to curing diseases, as it provides the basic preventive strategies and it reduce the rate of child and maternal morbidity and mortality—two of the most preventable outcomes that can prolong life expectancy at birth. Recently, mental health problems are on the rise in West Africa, as they are in many other world regions. However, the subject is largely a taboo, and professional treatment is still rare.

== Culture ==
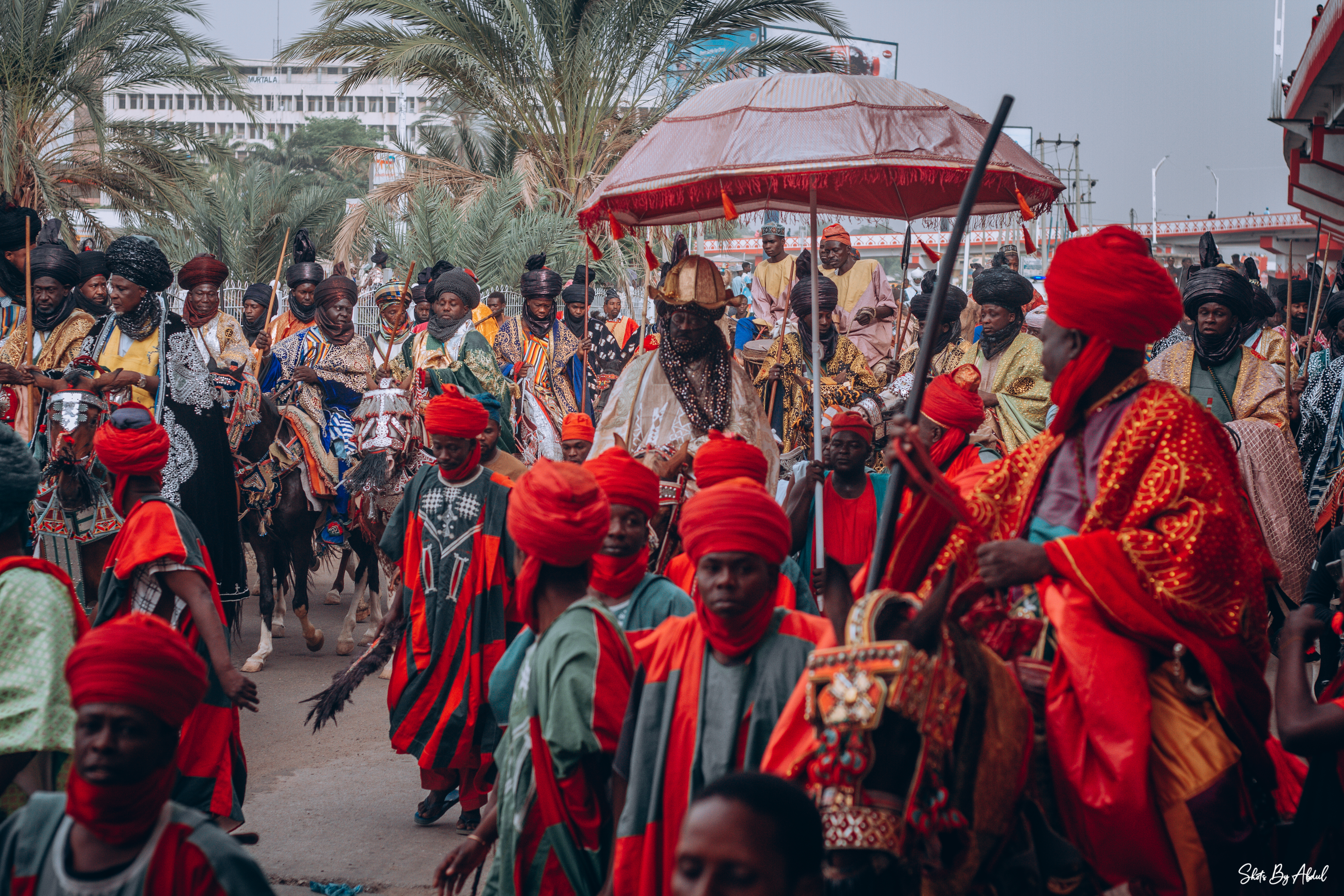
Emir of Kano in Nigeria

Despite the wide variety of cultures in West Africa, from Nigeria through to Senegal, there are general similarities in dress, cuisine, music and culture that are not shared extensively with groups outside the geographic region. This long history of cultural exchange predates the colonization era of the region and can be approximately placed at the time of the Ghana Empire (proper: Wagadou Empire), Mali Empire or perhaps before these empires. West Africa varies a series of tribes and cultures that have combined a diverse regional subculture.

=== Traditional architecture ===
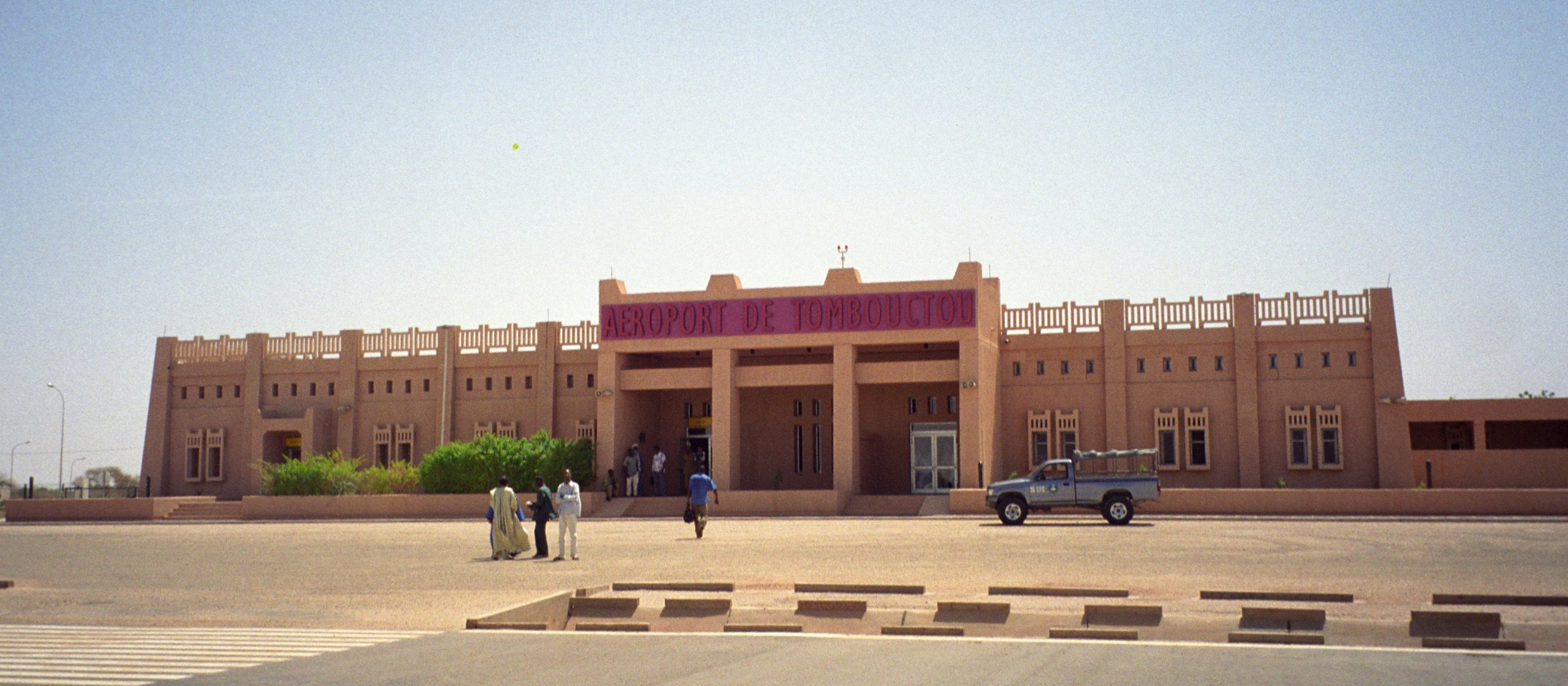
A street and airport in Timbuktu, Mali, showing the Sudano-Sahelian architectural style of the West African interior

The main traditional styles of building (in conjunction with modern styles) are the distinct Sudano-Sahelian style in inland areas, and the coastal forest styles more reminiscent of other sub-Saharan areas. They differ greatly in construction due to the demands made by the variety of climates in the area, from tropical humid forests to arid grasslands and deserts. Despite the architectural differences, buildings perform similar functions, including the compound structure central to West African family life or the strict distinction between the private and public worlds needed to maintain taboos or social etiquette.

=== Clothing ===
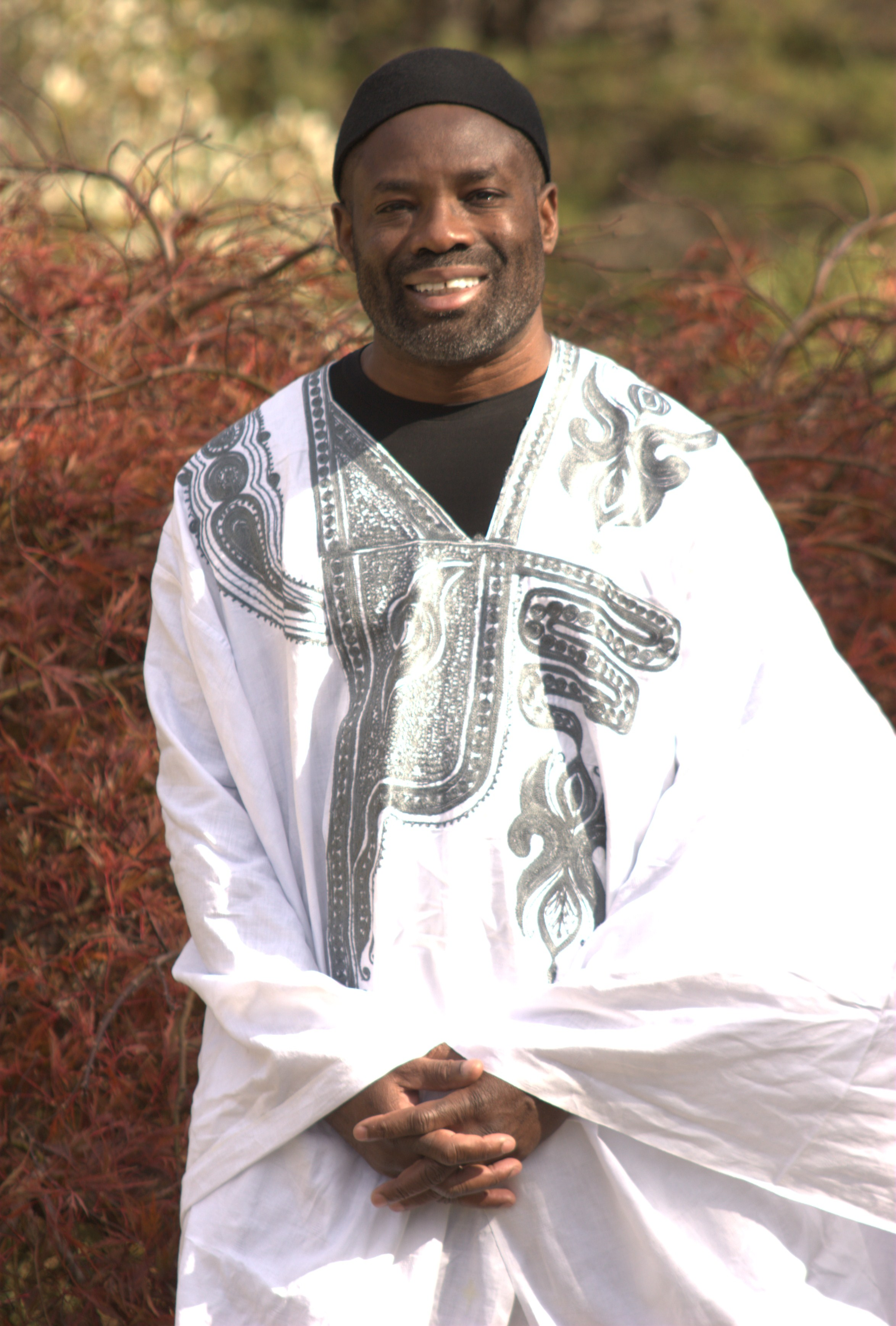
Philip Emeagwali wearing the boubou (or agbada), a traditional robe symbolic of West Africa

In contrast to other parts of the continent south of the Sahara Desert, the concepts of hemming and embroidering clothing have been traditionally common to West Africa for centuries, demonstrated by the production of various breeches, shirts, tunics and jackets. As a result, the people of the region's diverse nations wear a wide variety of clothing with underlying similarities. Typical pieces of West African formal attire include the knee-to-ankle-length, flowing boubou robe, dashiki, and Senegalese kaftan (also known as agbada and babariga), which has its origins in the clothing of nobility of various West African empires in the 12th century. Traditional half-sleeved, hip-long, woven smocks or tunics (known as fugu in Gurunsi, riga in Hausa) – worn over a pair of baggy trousers—are another popular garment. In the coastal regions stretching from southern Ivory Coast to Benin, a huge rectangular cloth is wrapped under one arm, draped over a shoulder, and held in one of the wearer's hands—coincidentally, reminiscent of Romans' togas. The best-known of these toga-like garments is the Kente (made by the Akan people of Ghana and Ivory Coast), who wear them as a gesture of national pride.

=== Cuisine ===
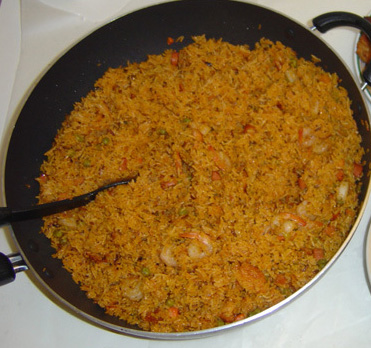
Jollof rice or benachin, one of many Pan–West African dishes found only in West Africa

Scores of foreign visitors to West African nations (e.g., traders, historians, emigrants, colonists, missionaries) have benefited from its citizens' generosity, and even left with a piece of its cultural heritage, via its foods. West African cuisines have had a significant influence on those of Western civilization for centuries; several dishes of West African origin are currently enjoyed in the Caribbean (such as the West Indies and Haiti); Australia; the US (particularly Louisiana, Virginia, North and South Carolina); Italy; and other countries. Although some of these recipes have been altered to suit the sensibilities of their adopters, they retain a distinct West African essence.

West African cuisines include fish (especially among the coastal areas), meat, vegetables, and fruits—most of which are grown by the nation's local farmers. In spite of the obvious differences among the various local cuisines in this multinational region, the foods display more similarities than differences. The small difference may be in the ingredients used. Most foods are cooked via boiling or frying. Commonly featured, starchy vegetables include yams, plantains, cassava, and sweet potatoes. Rice is also a staple food, as is the Serer people's sorghum couscous (called "chereh" in Serer) particularly in Senegal and the Gambia. Jollof rice—originally from the Kingdom of Jolof (now part of modern-day Senegal) but has spread to the Wolofs of Gambia—is also enjoyed in many Western nations, as well; Mafé (proper: "tigh-dege-na" or domodah) from Mali (via the Bambara and Mandinka)—a peanut-butter stew served with rice; Akara (fried bean balls seasoned with spices served with sauce and bread) from Nigeria is a favorite breakfast for Gambians and Senegalese, as well as a favorite side snack or side dish in Brazil and the Caribbean just as it is in West Africa. It is said that its exact origin may be from Yorubaland in Nigeria. Fufu (from the Twi language, a dough served with a spicy stew or sauce—for example, okra stew) from Ghana is enjoyed throughout the region and beyond even in Central Africa with their own versions of it. Dishes such as taguella and eghajira. are popular among the Tuareg people.

=== Recreation and sports ===
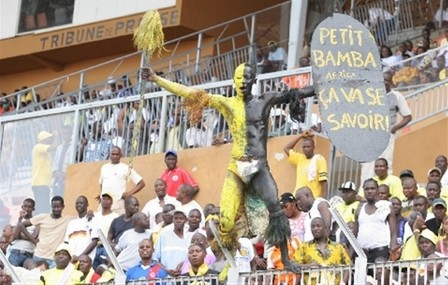
Supporters of ASEC Mimosas

The board game oware is quite popular in many parts of Southern Africa. The word "Oware" originates from the Akan people of Ghana. However, virtually all African peoples have a version of this board game. The major multi-sport event of West Africa is the ECOWAS Games which commenced at the 2012 ECOWAS Games.

Football is also a pastime enjoyed by many, either spectating or playing. The major national teams of West Africa, the Ghana national football team, the Ivory Coast national football team, and the Nigeria national football team regularly win the Africa Cup of Nations. Major football teams of West Africa are Asante Kotoko SC and Accra Hearts of Oak SC of the Ghana Premier League, Enyimba International of the Nigerian Premier League and ASEC Mimosas of the Ligue 1 (Ivory Coast). The football governing body of West Africa is the West African Football Union (WAFU) and the major tournament is the West African Club Championship and WAFU Nations Cup, along with the annual individual award of West African Footballer of the Year.

=== Music ===
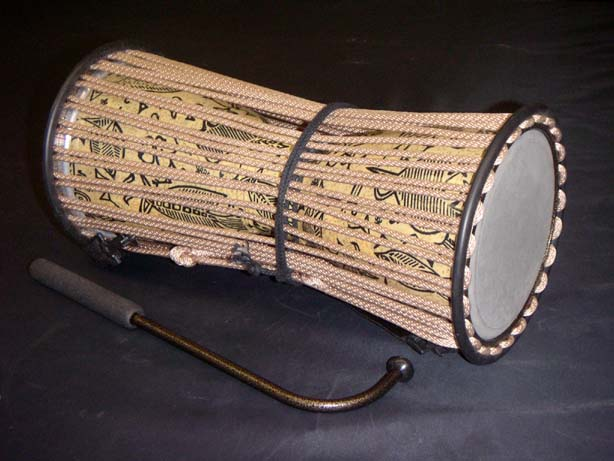
The talking drum is an instrument unique to West Africa.

Mbalax, Highlife, Fuji, Afrobeat, and Afrobeats are modern musical genres of West Africa and its diaspora. Traditional folk music is also well-preserved. Some types of folk music are religious in nature such as the "Tassou" tradition used in Serer religion.

==== Griot artists ====
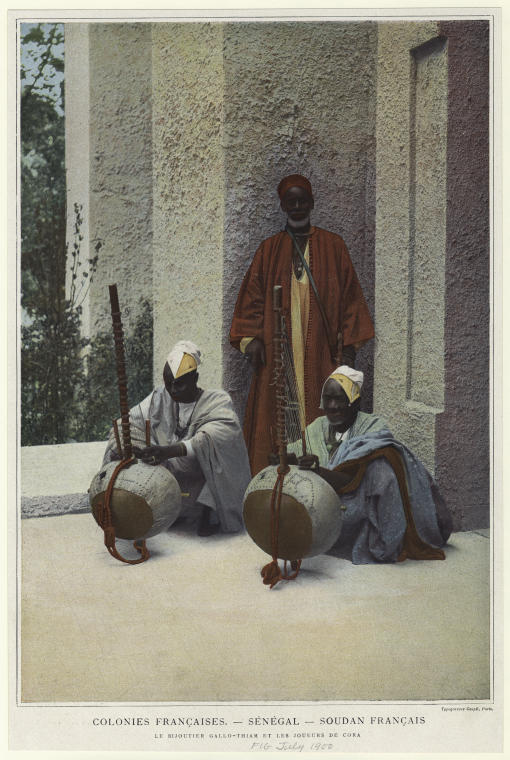
Kora-playing griots in Senegal, 1900. Both the Kora, a 21-stringed harp-lute, and the griot musical caste are unique to West Africa.

Griot artists and praise-singing is an important musical tradition related to the oral history of West African culture. Traditionally, musical and oral history as conveyed over generations by griots are typical of West African culture in Mande, Wolof, Songhay, Serer and, to some extent, Fula areas in the far west. A hereditary caste occupying the fringes of society, the griots were charged with memorizing the histories of local rulers and personages and the caste was further broken down into music-playing griots (similar to bards) and non-music-playing griots. Like Praise-singers, the griot's main profession was musical acquisition and prowess, and patrons were the sole means of financial support. Modern griots enjoy higher status in the patronage of rich individuals in places such as Mali, Senegal, Gambia, Mauritania and Guinea, and to some extent make up the vast majority of musicians in these countries. Examples of modern popular griot artists include Youssou N'Dour, Mamadou Diabate, Sona Jobareteh, and Toumani Diabate.

In other areas of West Africa, primarily among the Hausa, Mossi, Dagomba and Yoruba in the area encompassing Burkina Faso, northern Ghana, Nigeria and Niger, the traditional profession of non-hereditary praise-singers, minstrels, bards and poets play a vital role in extending the public show of power, lineage and prestige of traditional rulers through their exclusive patronage. Like the griot tradition, praise singers are charged with knowing the details of specific historical events and royal lineages, but more importantly need to be capable of poetic improvisation and creativity, with knowledge of traditional songs directed towards showing a patron's financial and political or religious power. Competition between Praise-singing ensembles and artists is high, and artists responsible for any extraordinarily skilled prose, musical compositions, and panegyric songs are lavishly rewarded with money, clothing, provisions and other luxuries by patrons who are usually politicians, rulers, Islamic clerics and merchants; these successful praise-singers rise to national stardom. Examples include Mamman Shata, Souley Konko, Fati Niger, Saadou Bori and Dan Maraya. In the case of Niger, numerous praise songs are composed and shown on television in praise of local rulers, Islamic clerics, and politicians.

=== Film industry ===
Nollywood of Nigeria, is the main film industry of West Africa. The Nigerian cinema industry is the second largest film industry in terms of number of annual film productions, ahead of the American film industry in Hollywood. Senegal and Ghana also have long traditions of producing films. The late Ousmane Sembène, the Senegalese film director, producer and writer is from the region, as is the Ghanaian Shirley Frimpong-Manso.

=== Writing systems ===
- Vai (Unicode block)
- Tifinagh (Unicode block)

== Religion ==
West Africa along with North Africa are the only regions in Africa which have Muslim majority populations, and Nigeria has the largest Muslim population in Africa. In addition to Islam, Christianity and traditional religions are also practiced.

=== Christianity ===
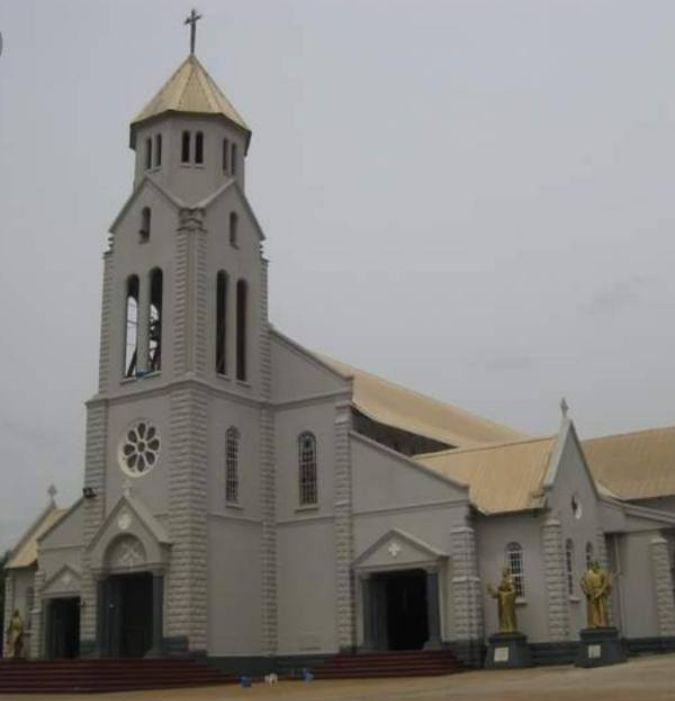
Cathedral Basilica of the Most Holy Trinity, Onitsha, Nigeria

Christianity is the second largest religion practiced in West Africa. Christianity was largely introduced from the late 18th century onward, when missionaries from European countries brought the religion to the region. West African Christians are predominantly Roman Catholic or Anglican; some Evangelical churches have also been established. Christianity is the predominant religion in Ghana, Togo, Benin Republic, Liberia to coastal parts of Sierra Leone and southern part of Nigeria and Ivory Coast . elements of traditional African religion are mixed with Christianity.

=== Islam ===
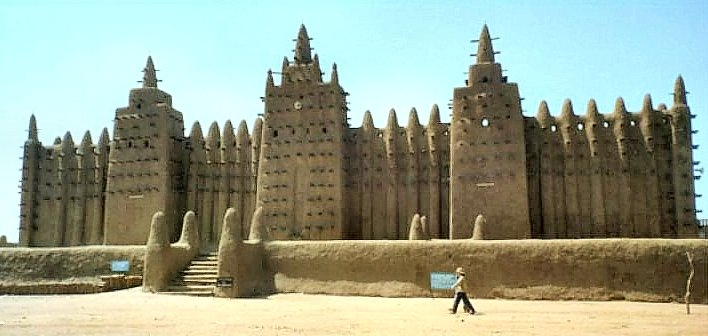
The 13th-century Great Mosque of Djenné is a superb example of the indigenous Sahelian architectural style prevalent in the Savannah and Sahelian interior of West Africa. It is listed a UNESCO World Heritage Site.

Islam is largely practiced in the West African interior and the far west coast of the continent and was introduced to the region by traders in the 8th century. Islamic rules on livelihood, values, dress and practices had a profound effect on the populations and cultures in their predominant areas, so much so that the concept of tribalism is less observed by Islamized groups like the Wolof, Hausa, Fula, Songhai, Zarma or Soninke, than they are by non-Islamized groups. Ethnic intermarriage and shared cultural icons are established through a superseded commonality of belief or community, known as ummah. Traditional Muslim areas include Senegal, Gambia, Mali, Mauritania, Guinea, Niger; the upper coast of Sierra Leone the western, northern and far-eastern regions of Burkina Faso; and the northern half of Nigeria and Ivory Coast.

=== African traditional ===
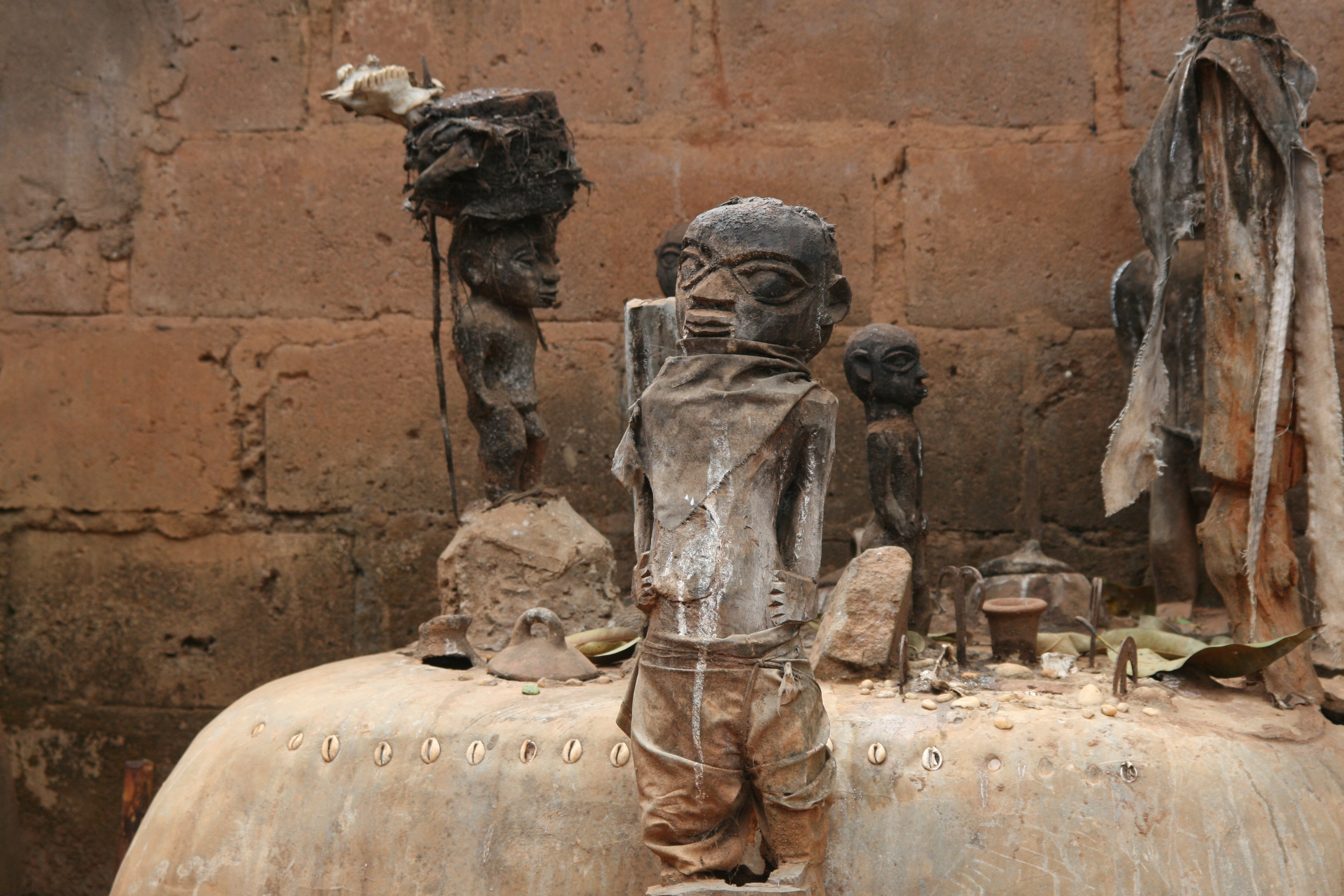
Voodoo altar with several fetishes in Abomey, Benin

Traditional African religions (noting the many different belief systems) are the oldest belief systems among the populations of this region, and include Akan religion, Yoruba religion, Odinani-Igbo, and Serer religion. They are spiritual creeds that also perform other functions such as preserving the historical and cultural heritage of the people, and "West African tribal groups" blend social and religious rituals together to the point where there is usually not "much distinction" between them. Although traditional beliefs vary from one place to the next, there are more similarities than differences.

Most traditional religious organizations "do not have a formal hierarchy of priests." Group rituals are usually overseen by tribal elders who, "within many cultures", "serve as the main religious figures and determine the time, nature, and intricacies of rituals", or shaman priests who can use magic to heal, control fate, and connect to the spirit world.

== Demographics and languages ==
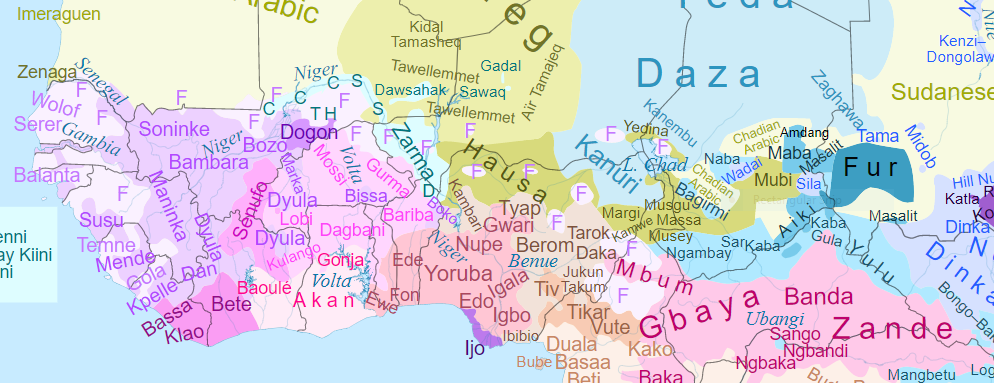
Language family map of West Africa

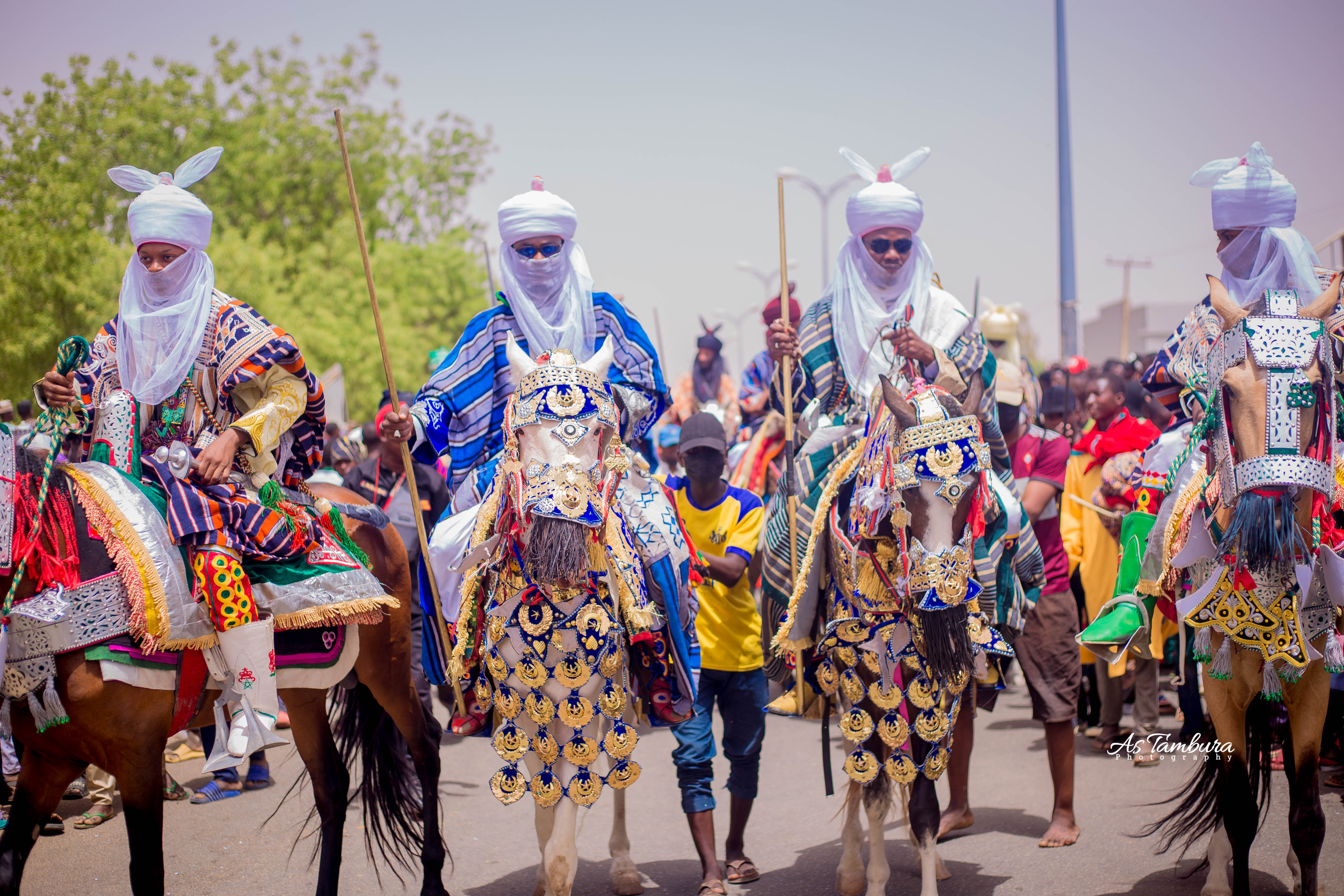
Hausa people are native to West Africa

Native West Africans primarily speak Niger–Congo languages, belonging mostly, though not exclusively, to its non-Bantu branches, though some Nilo-Saharan and Afro-Asiatic speaking groups are also found in West Africa. The Niger–Congo-speaking Yoruba, Igbo, Fulani, Akan and Wolof ethnic groups are the largest and most influential. In the central Sudan/Sahel, Mande groups, especially the Mandinka, are most significant. Chadic-speaking groups, most prominently including the Hausa, and Nilo-Saharan-speaking communities, such as the Songhai, Kanuri and Zarma, are found in the eastern parts of the Sahel bordering Central Africa. In Mali, Niger, and Burkina Faso, the nomadic Tuareg speak the Tuareg language, a Berber language. Hassaniya Arabic and Modern Standard Arabic exist in a state of diglossia in Mauritania and northernmost Mali, and Classical Arabic is also commonly studied among Muslims of the region as the liturgical language of Islam. The population of West Africa is estimated at 419 million people as of 2021.

Colonial languages, namely French, English and Portuguese, also play a pivotal cultural and political role, being adopted as the official languages of most countries in the region. In addition, they (or West African Pidgin English or Portuguese-based creole languages) serve as linguae franca in communication between the region's various ethnic groups. For historical reasons, Western European languages are most influential in the southern and coastal portions of the region, especially in urban centers.

== Architecture ==
Further information in the sections of Architecture of Africa:

- Prehistoric West African Architecture
- Ancient West African Architecture
- Medieval West African Architecture

== Science and technology ==
Further information in the sections of History of science and technology in Africa:

- Education
- Astronomy
- Mathematics
- Metallurgy
- Medicine
- Agriculture
- Textiles
- Maritime technology
- Architecture
- Communication systems
- Warfare
- Commerce
- By country

== Economic and regional organizations ==
Map of petroleum and natural gas within West Africa

=== Economic Community of West Africa ===
The Economic Community of West African States (ECOWAS; also known as CEDEAO in French and Portuguese) is a regional political and economic union of twelve countries of West Africa. Collectively, the present and former members comprise an area of 5,114,162 km^{2} (1,974,589 sq mi) and have an estimated population of over 424.34 million.

Considered one of the pillar regional blocs of the continent-wide African Economic Community (AEC), the stated goal of ECOWAS is to achieve "collective self-sufficiency" for its member states by creating a single large trade bloc by building a full economic and trading union. Additionally, ECOWAS aims to raise living standards and promote economic development. The union was established on 28 May 1975, with the signing of the Treaty of Lagos, with its stated mission to promote economic integration across the region. A revised version of the treaty was agreed and signed on 24 July 1993 in Cotonou, the largest city in Benin.

ECOWAS's published principles include equality and inter-dependence of member states, solidarity, self-reliance, cooperation and harmonization of policies, nonaggression, promotion of human rights, economic and social justice, and democratic governance.

Notably among ECOWAS's protocols and plans are the ECOWAS Free Movement of Persons, Residences and Establishment Protocol and the Ecotour Action Plan 2019–2029. The Free Movement of Persons Protocol permits citizens the right to enter and reside in any member state's territory, and the Ecotour Action Plan aims to develop and integrate the tourist industry of each member state.

ECOWAS also serves as a peacekeeping force in the region, with member states occasionally sending joint military forces to intervene in the bloc's member countries at times of political instability and unrest.

In 2024, the military governments of Niger, Burkina Faso, and Mali jointly announced their withdrawal from the bloc, after having been suspended following respective military takeovers in these countries. The withdrawal took effect on 29 January 2025. The three later went on to form the Alliance of Sahel States, with the end goal of establishing a federation.

=== West African Monetary Union ===
The West African Monetary Union (or UEMOA from its name in French, Union économique et monétaire ouest-africaine) is limited to the eight, mostly Francophone countries that employ the CFA franc as their common currency. The Liptako–Gourma Authority of Mali, Niger, and Burkina Faso seeks to jointly develop the contiguous areas of the three countries.

=== Women's peace movement ===
Since the adoption of the United Nations Security Council Resolution 1325 in 2000, women have been engaged in rebuilding war-torn Africa. Starting with the Women of Liberia Mass Action for Peace and Women in Peacebuilding Network (WIPNET), the peace movement has grown to include women across West Africa.

Established on 8 May 2006, Women Peace and Security Network – Africa (WIPSEN-Africa), is a women-focused, women-led Pan-African non-governmental organization based in Ghana. The organization focuses on empowering women to have a role in political and peace governance in Africa. It has a presence in Ghana, Nigeria, Ivory Coast, Liberia and Sierra Leone. Regional leaders of nonviolent resistance include Leymah Gbowee, Comfort Freeman, and Aya Virginie Toure.

Pray the Devil Back to Hell is a documentary film about the origin of this peace movement. The film has been used as an advocacy tool in post-conflict zones like Sudan and Zimbabwe, mobilizing African women to petition for peace and security.

== Gallery ==
=== Cityscapes of the largest cities ===
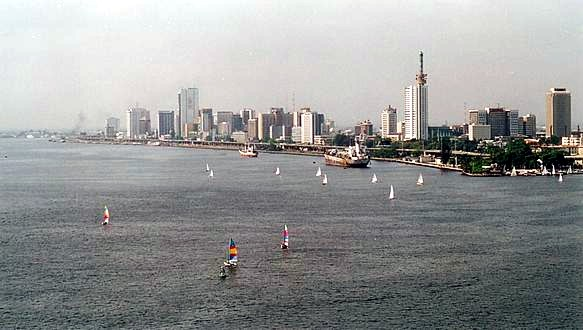
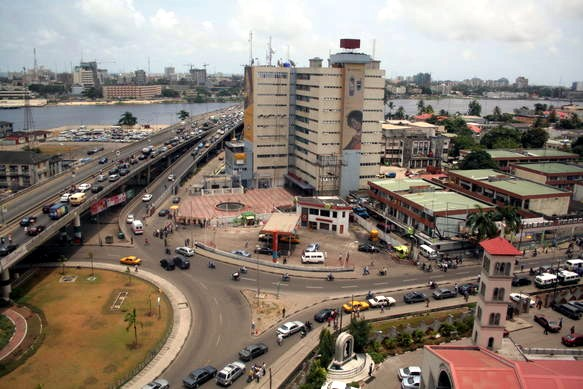
Bird's-eye view of the West Africa City of Lagos, Lagos State, Nigeria
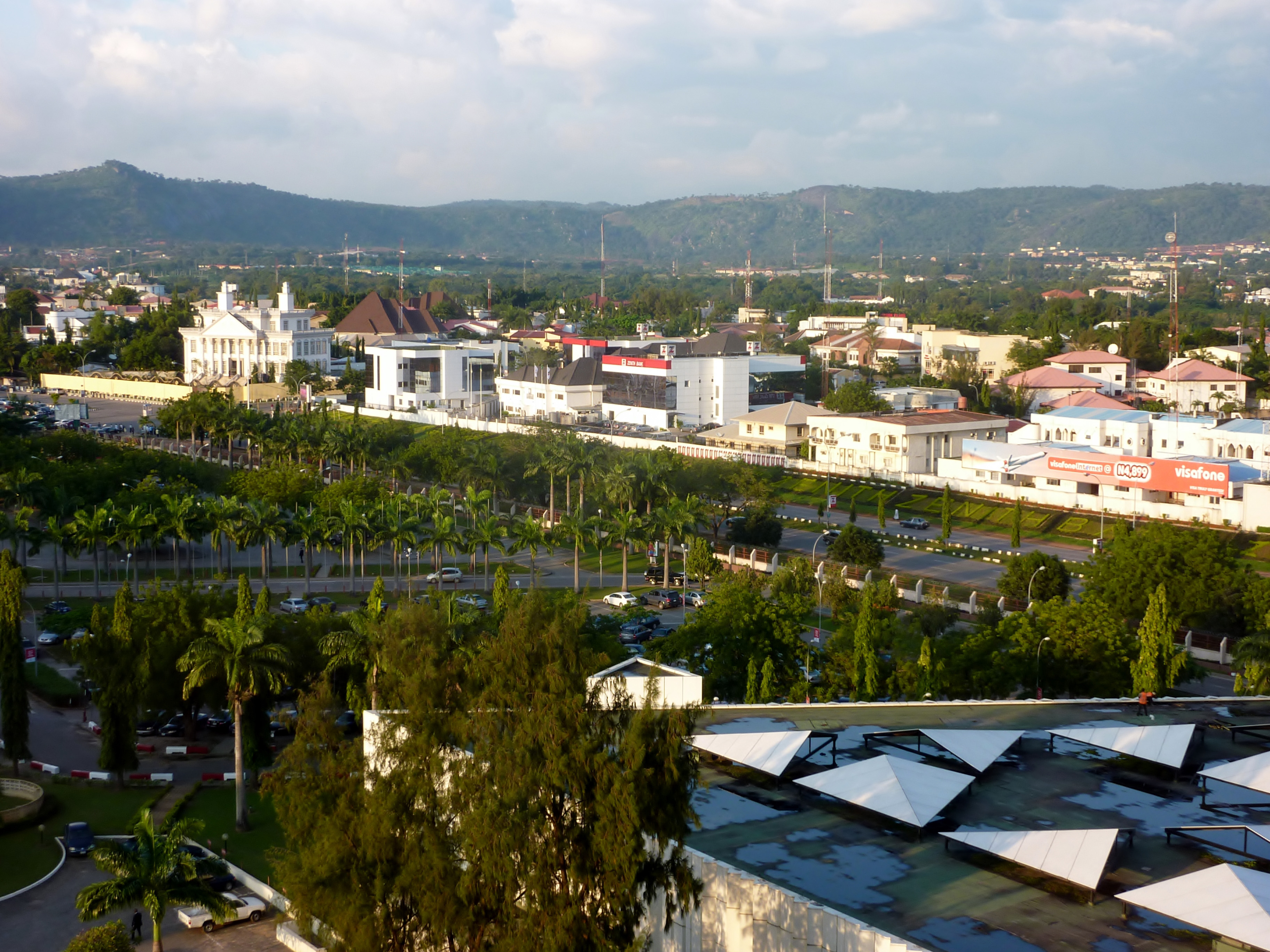
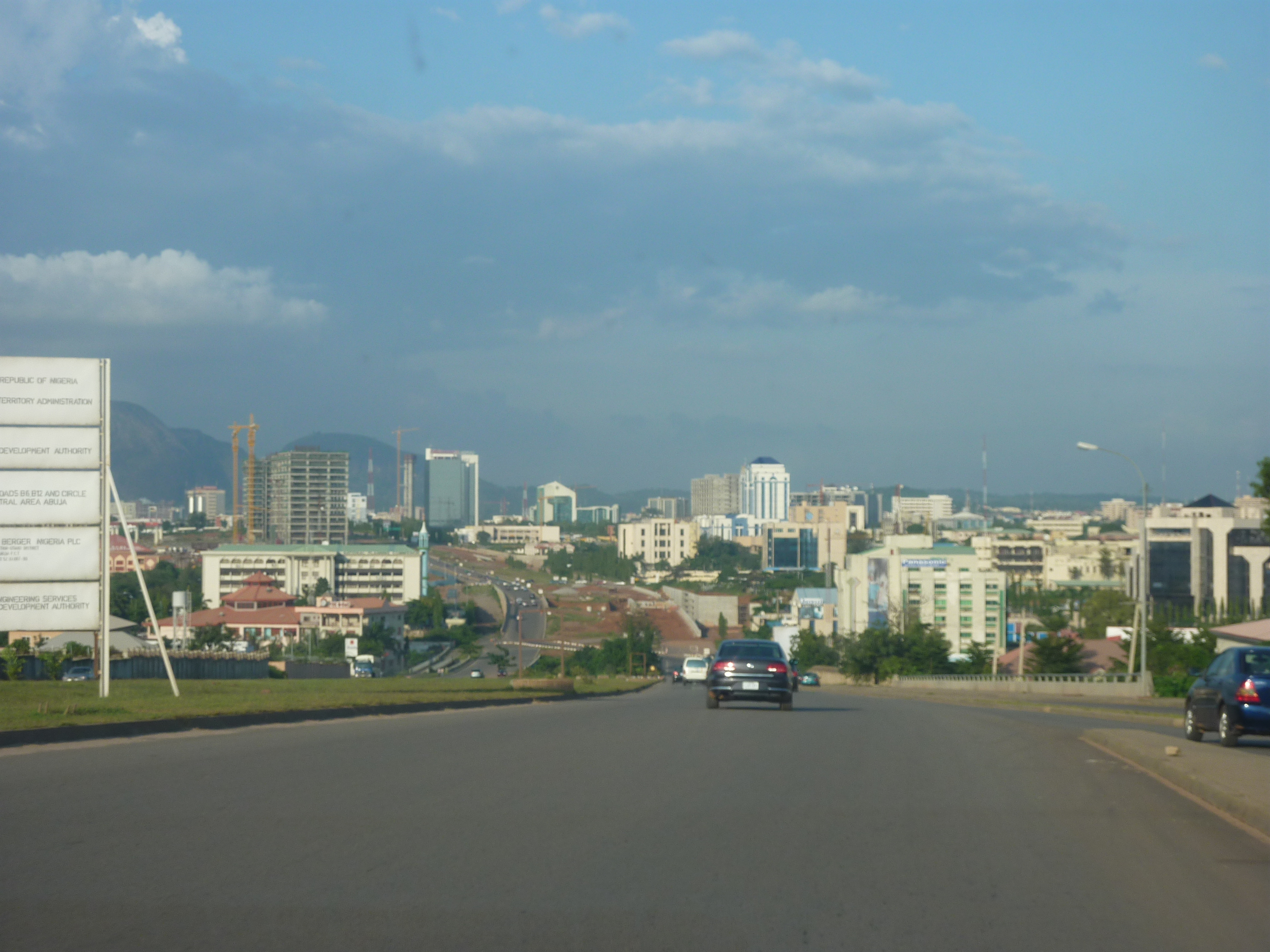
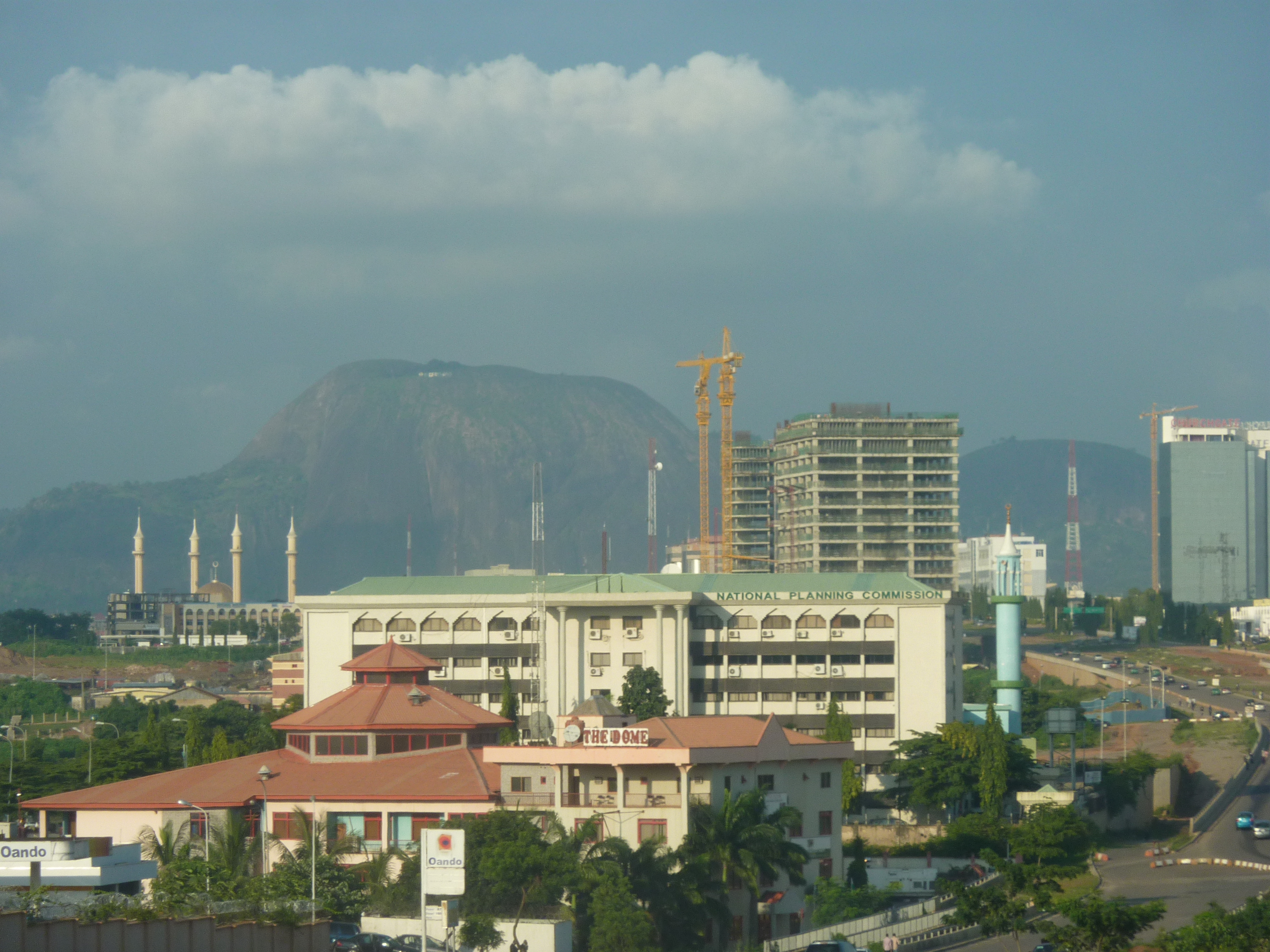
Bird's-eye view of the West Africa City of Abuja, Federal Capital Territory, Nigeria
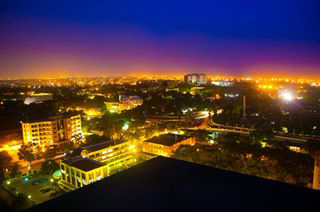
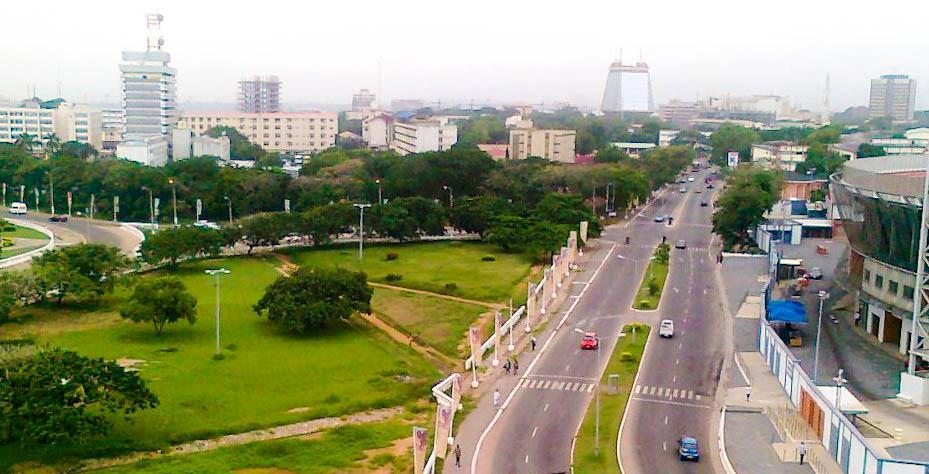
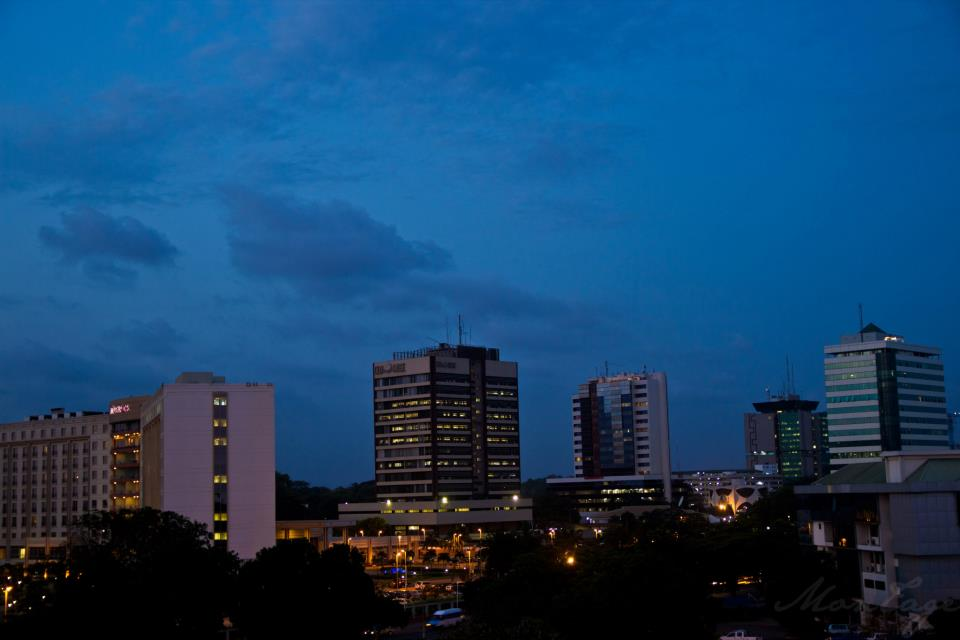
Bird's-eye view of the West Africa City of Accra, Greater Accra, Ghana
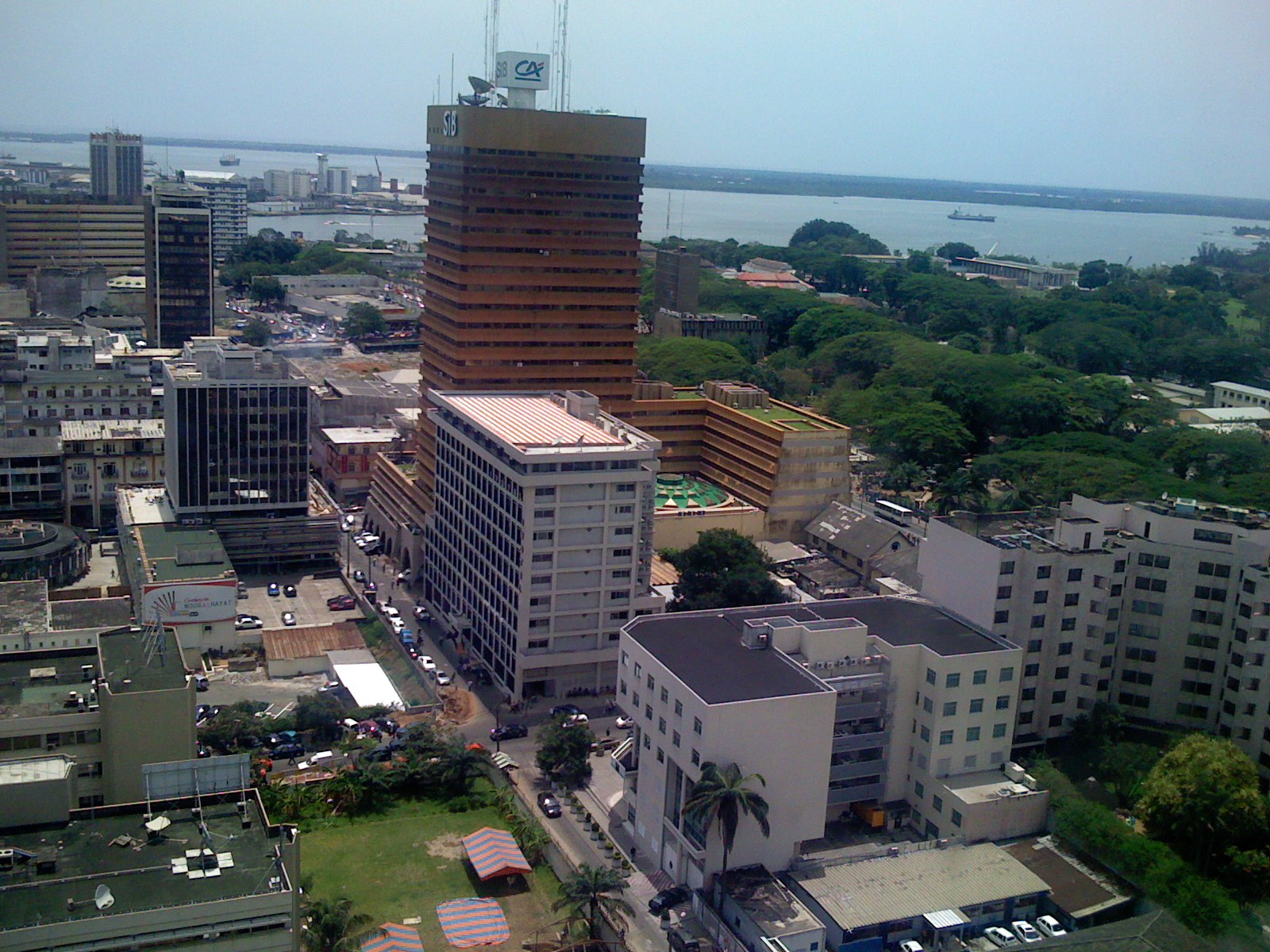
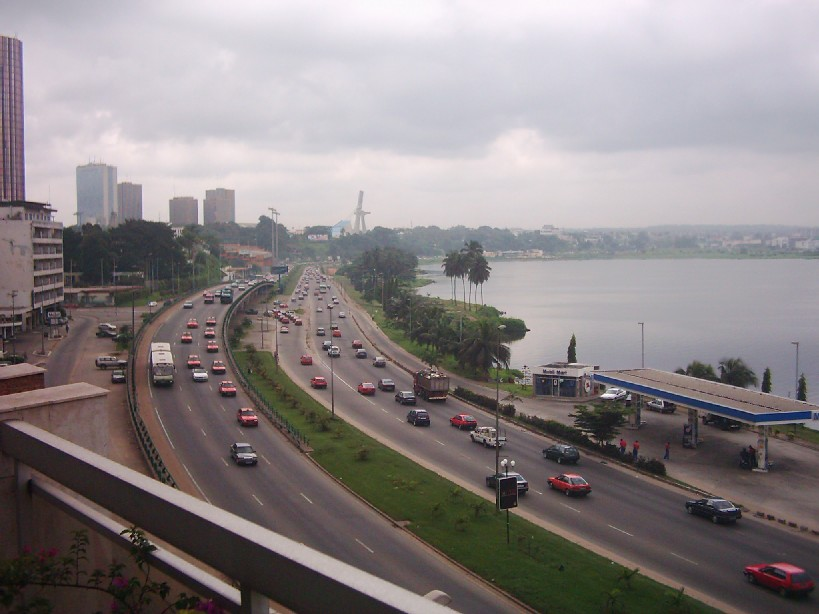
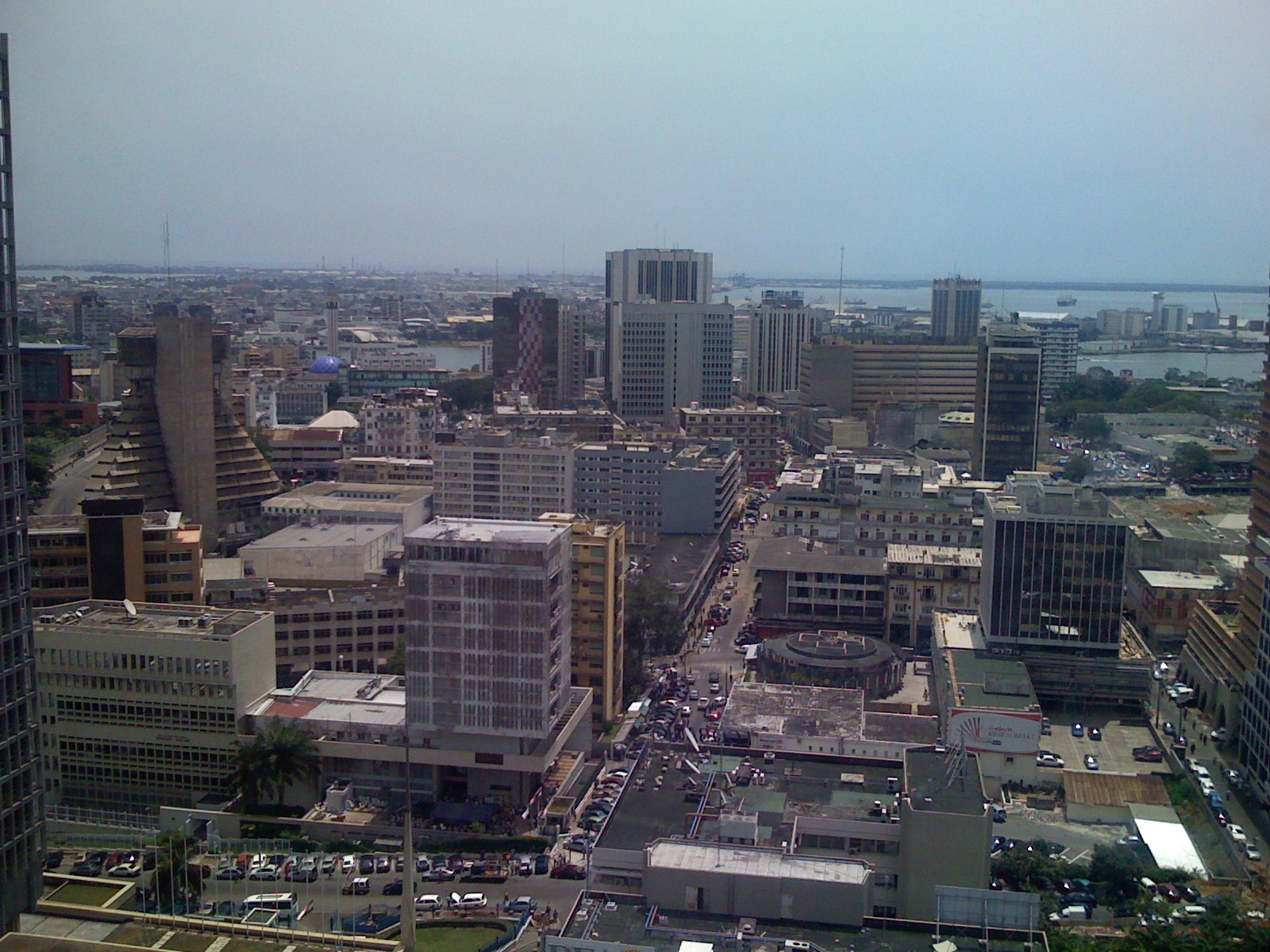
Bird's-eye view of the West Africa City of Abidjan, Lagunes, Ivory Coast
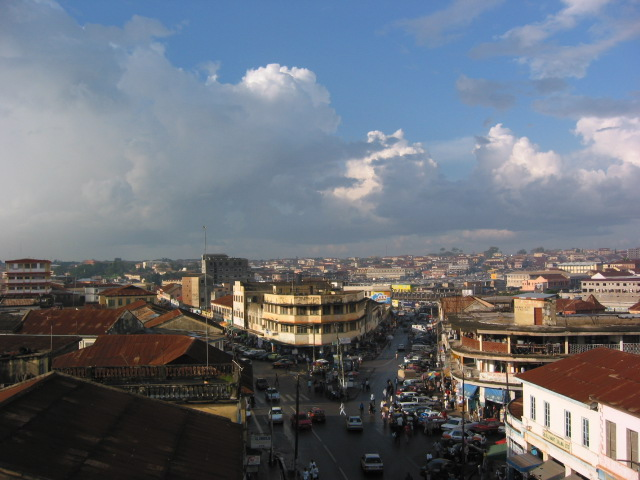
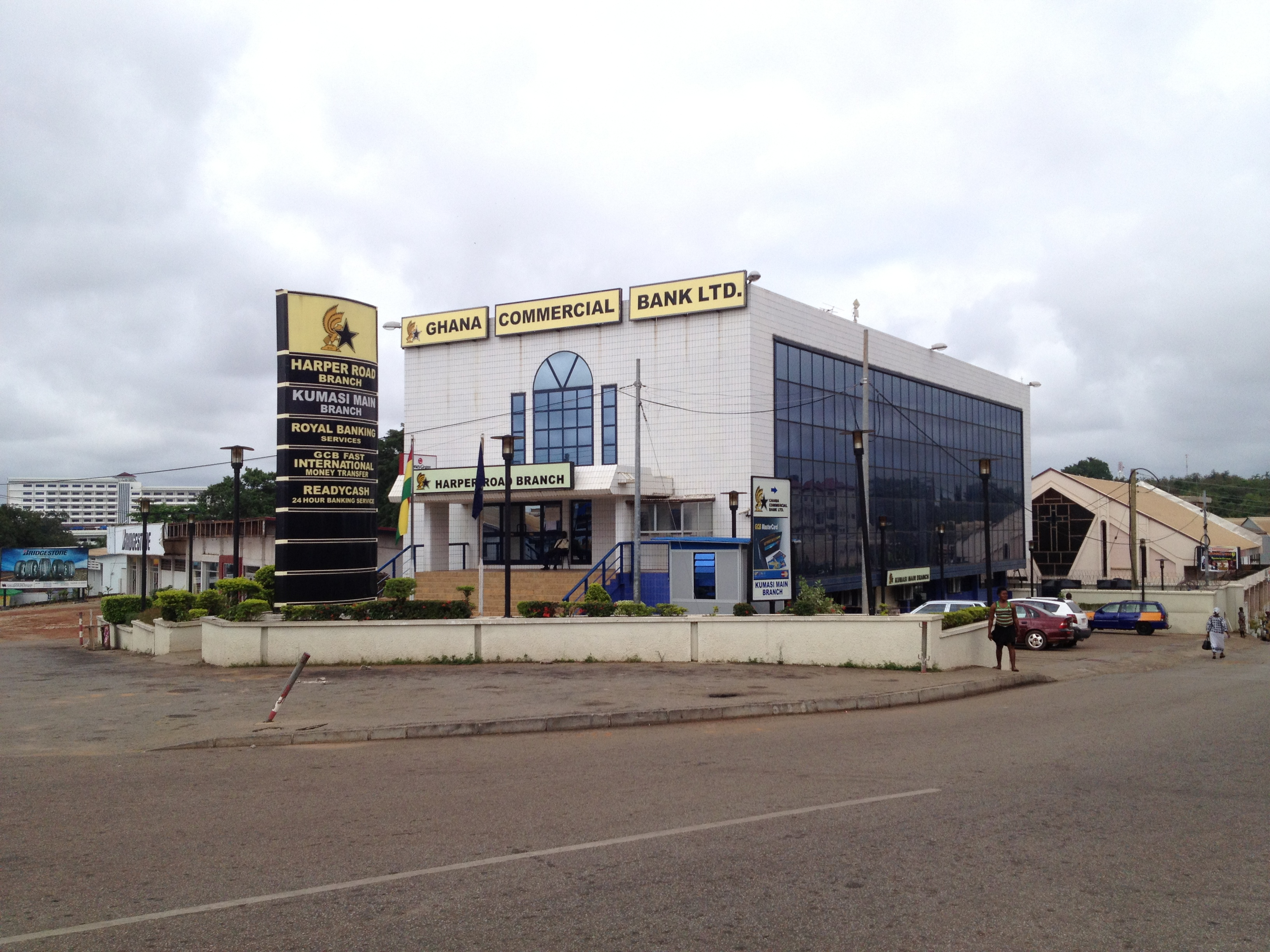
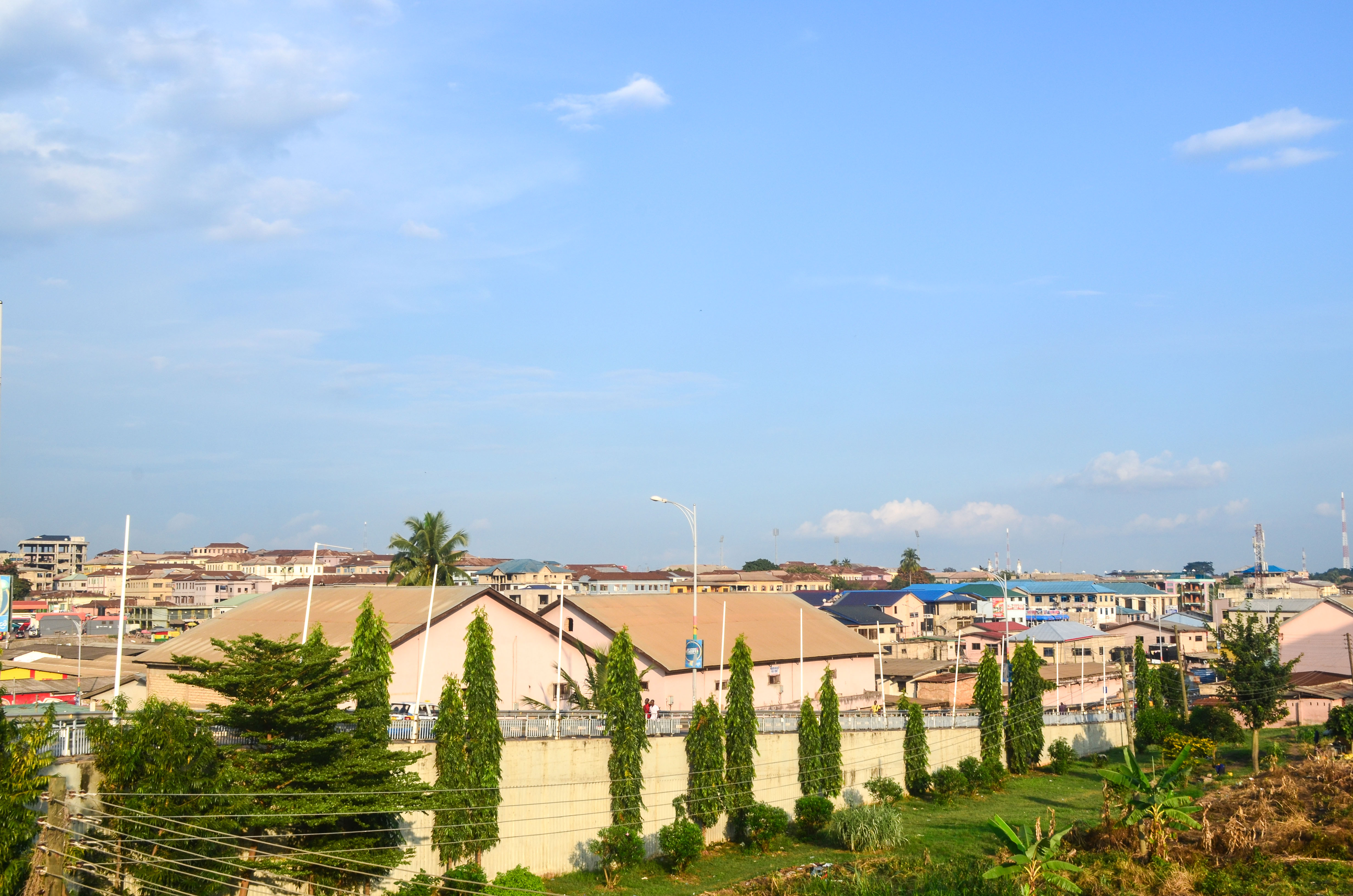
Bird's-eye view of the West Africa City of Kumasi, Ashanti, Ghana
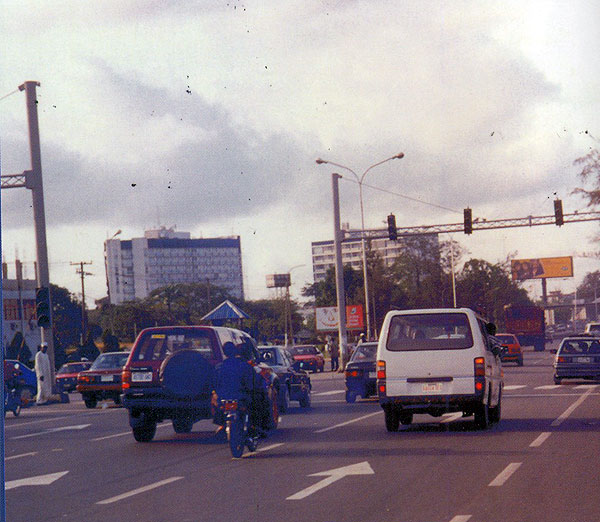
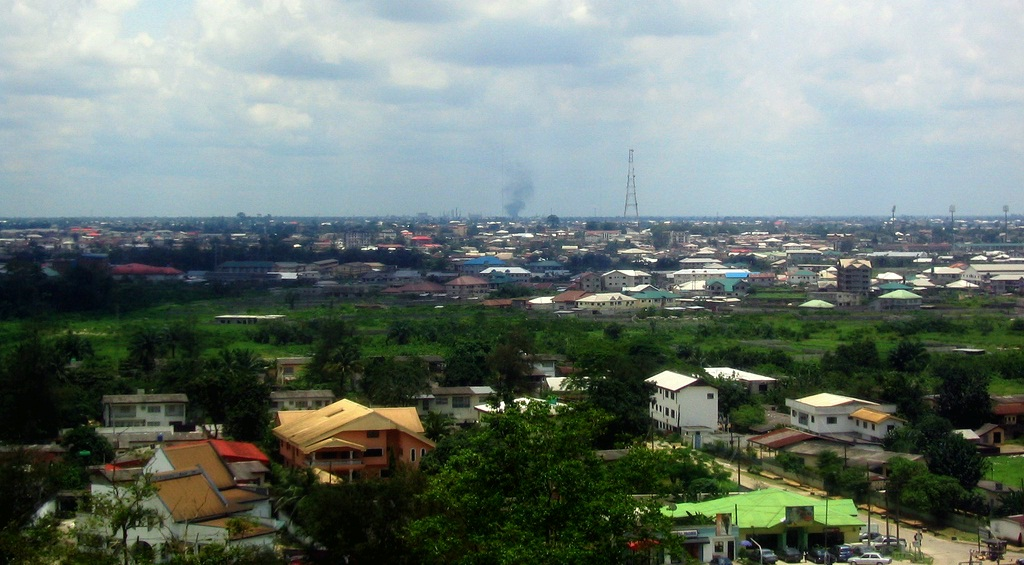
Bird's-eye view of the West Africa City of Port Harcourt, Rivers State, Nigeria

=== Capital cities of West Africa ===
Capital cities of West Africa

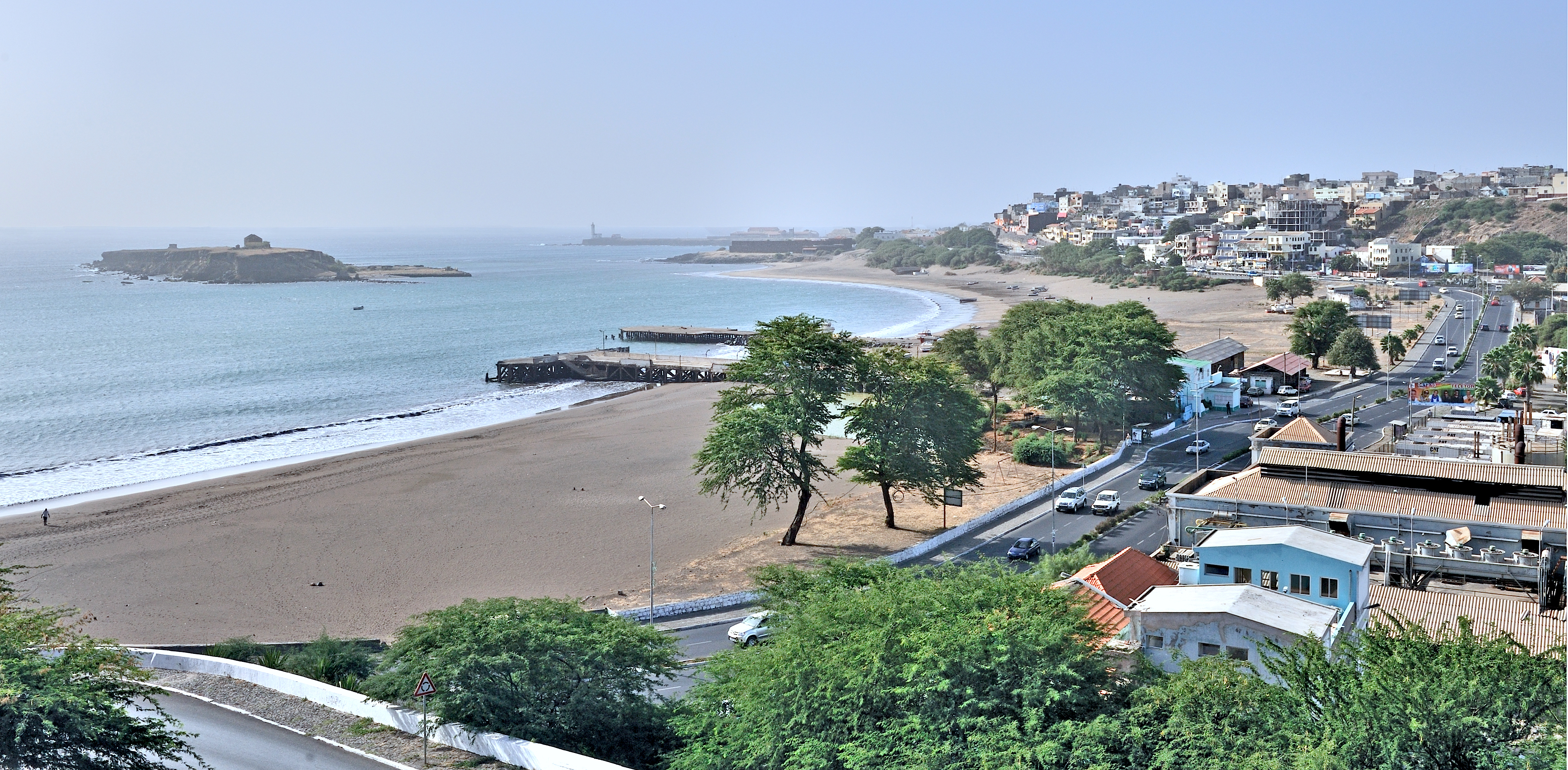
Praia, Cape Verde

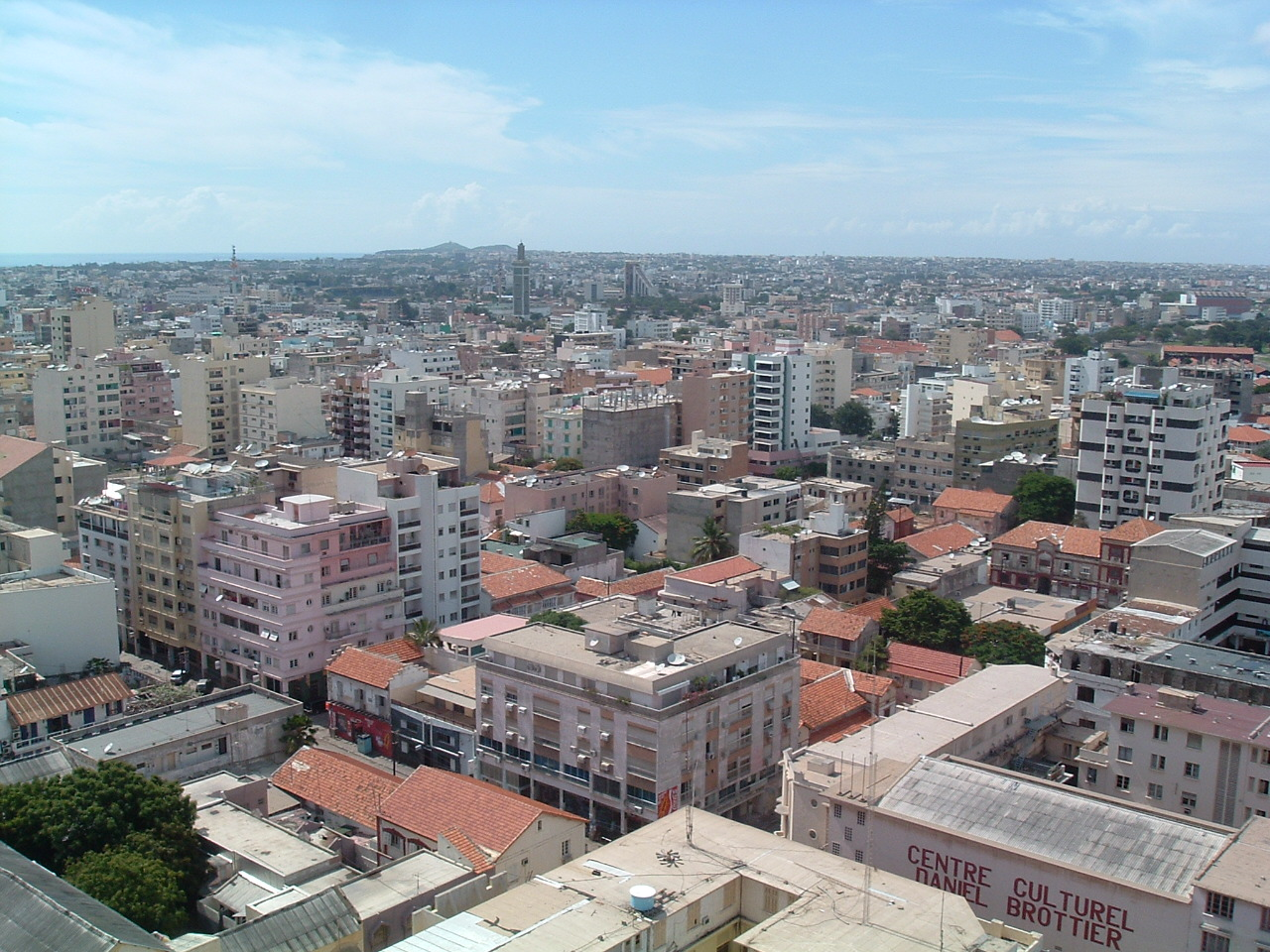
Dakar, Senegal

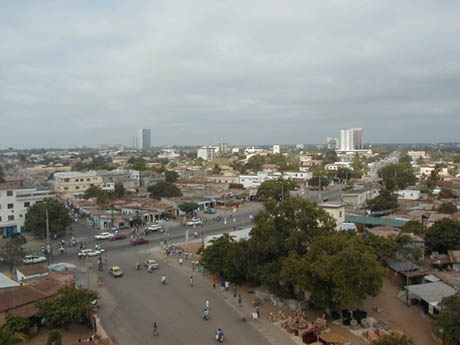
Lomé, Togo

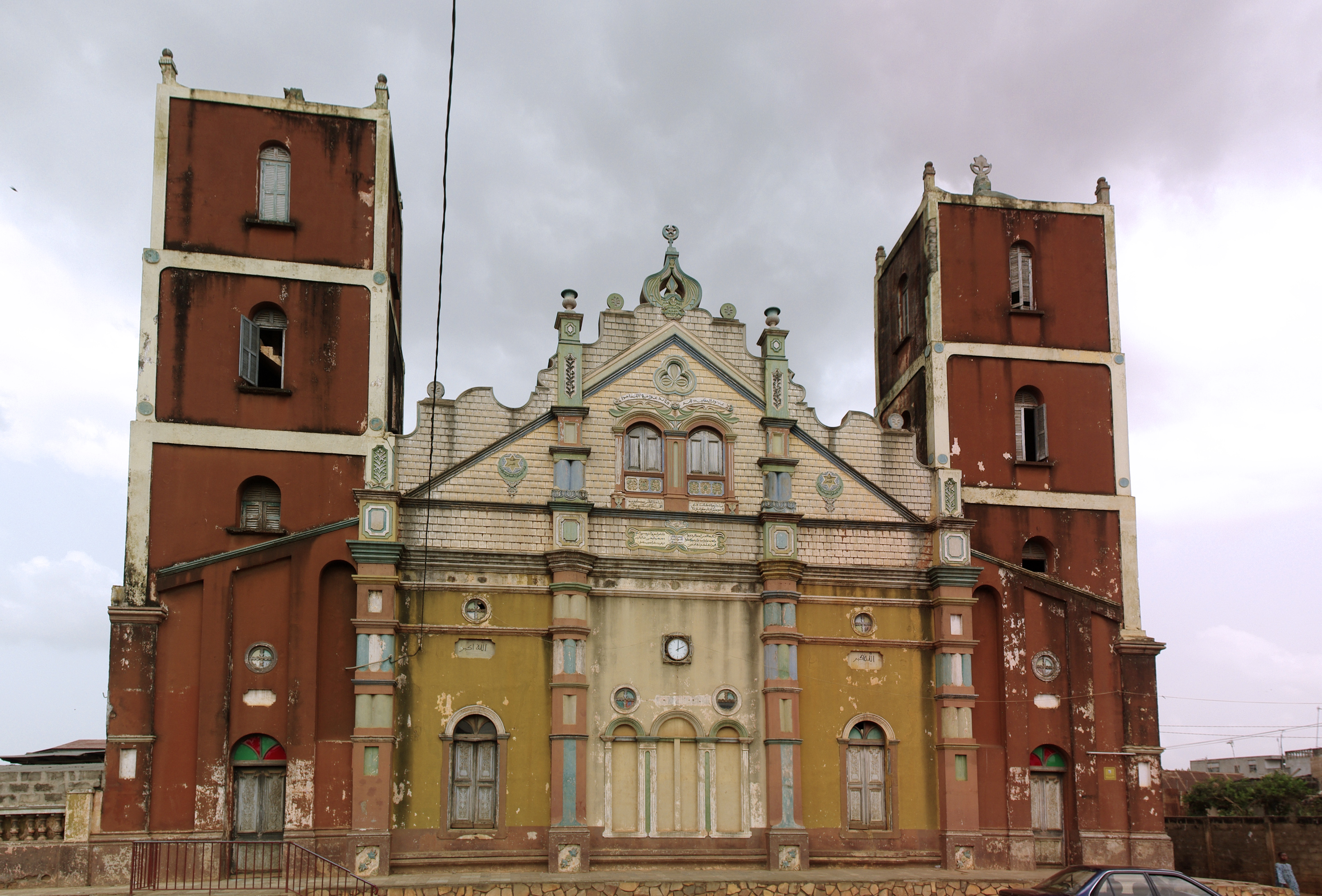
Porto-Novo, Benin

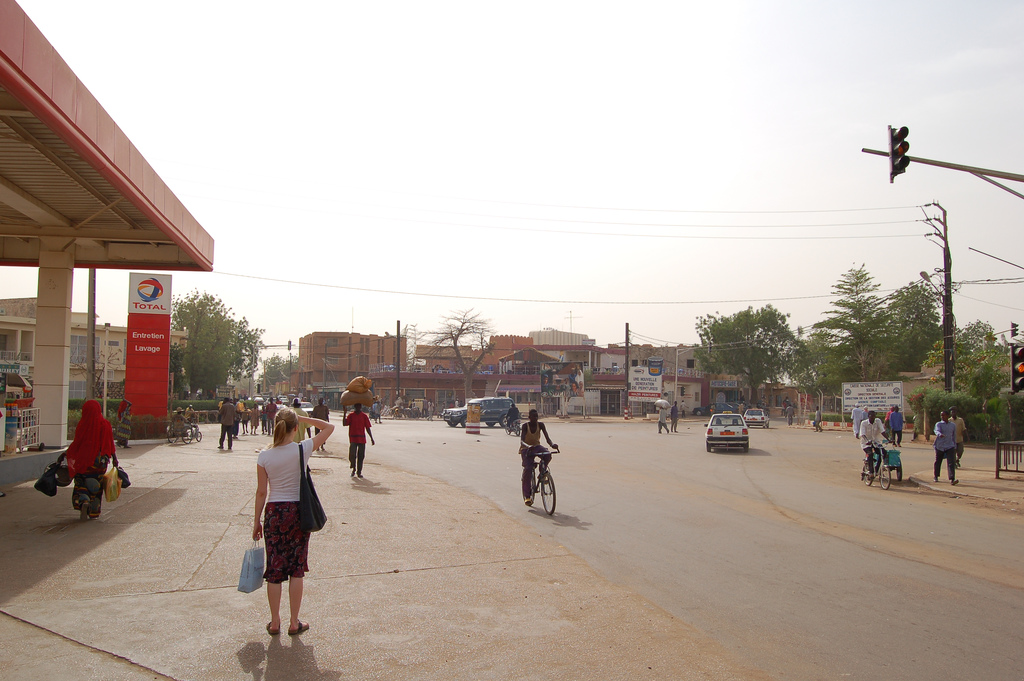
Niamey, Niger

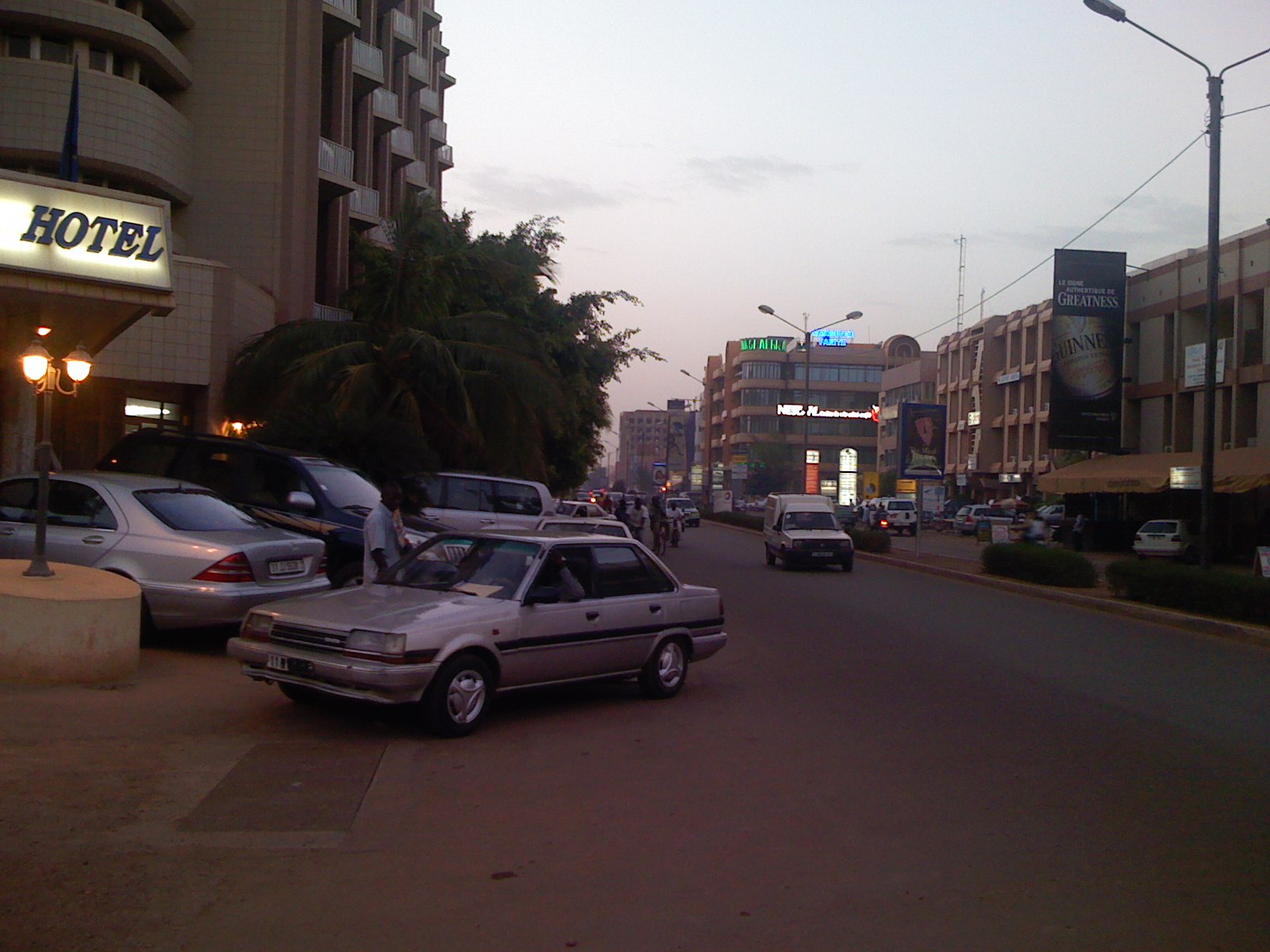
Ouagadougou, Burkina Faso

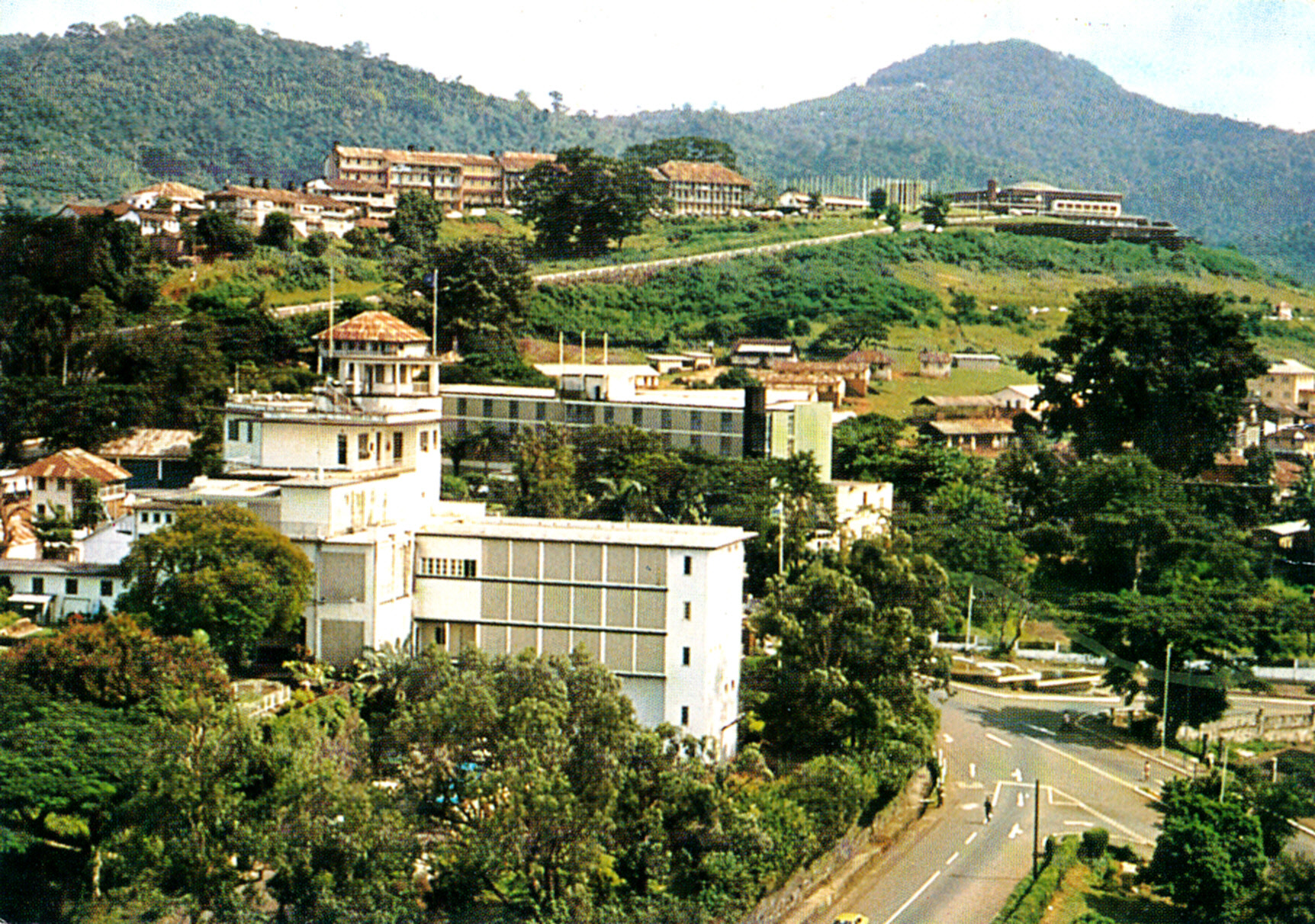
Freetown, Sierra Leone

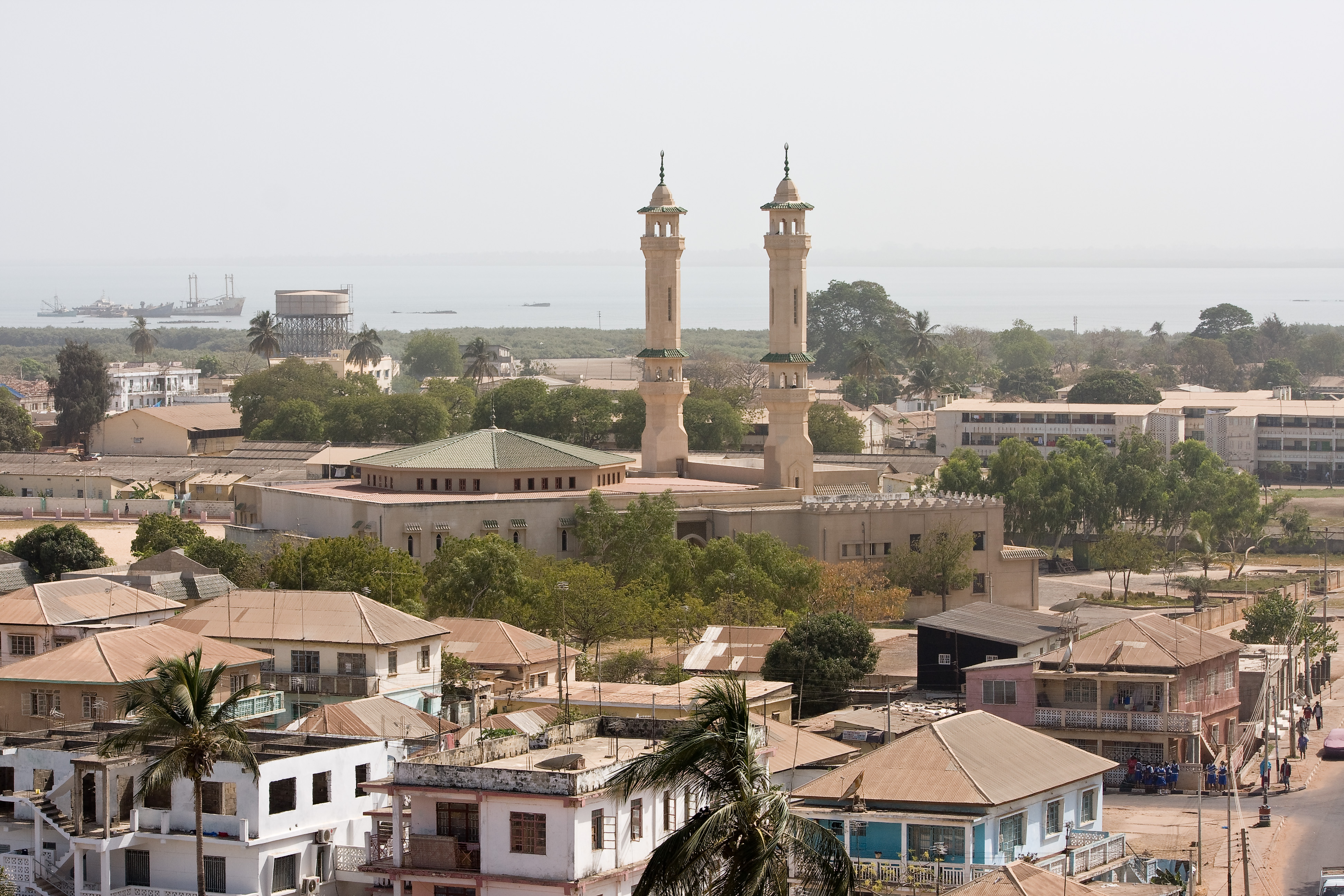
Banjul, Gambia

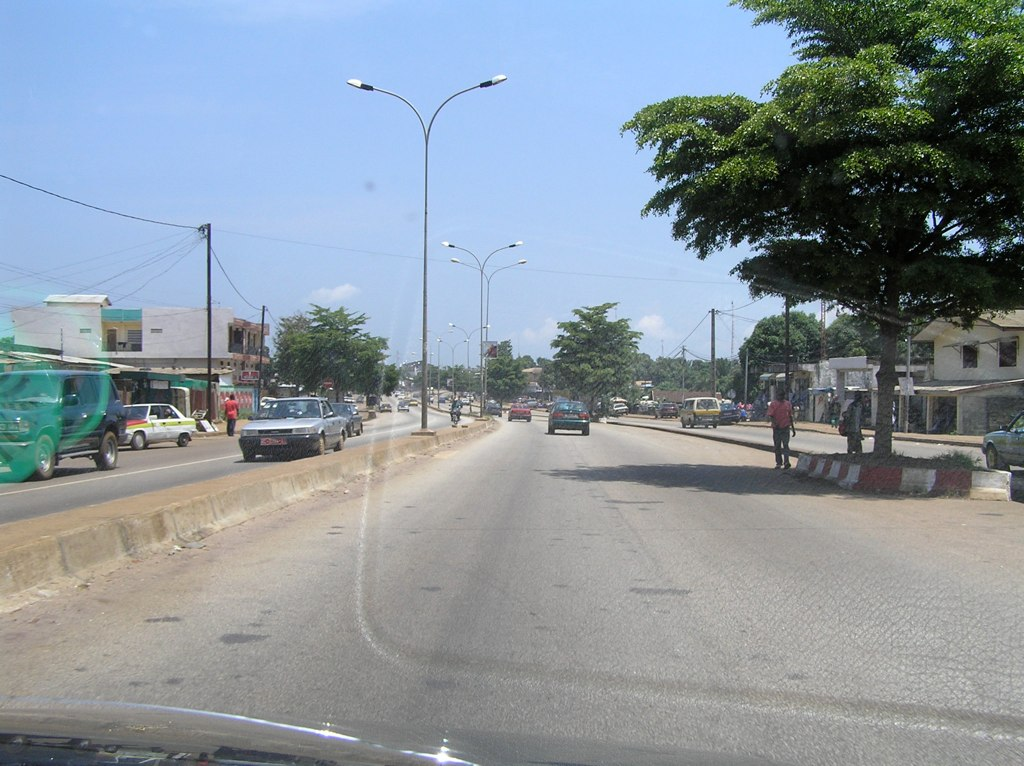
Conakry, Guinea

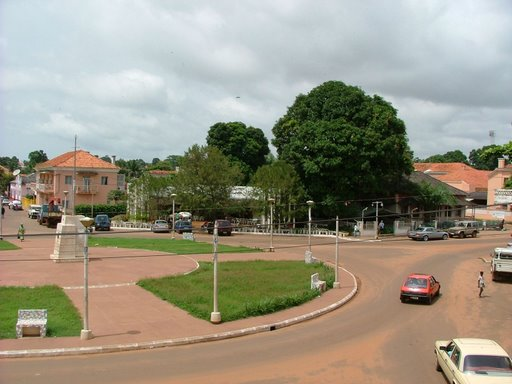
Bissau, Guinea-Bissau

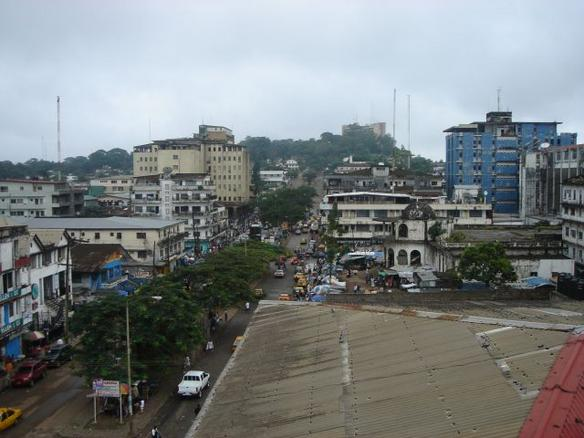
Monrovia, Liberia

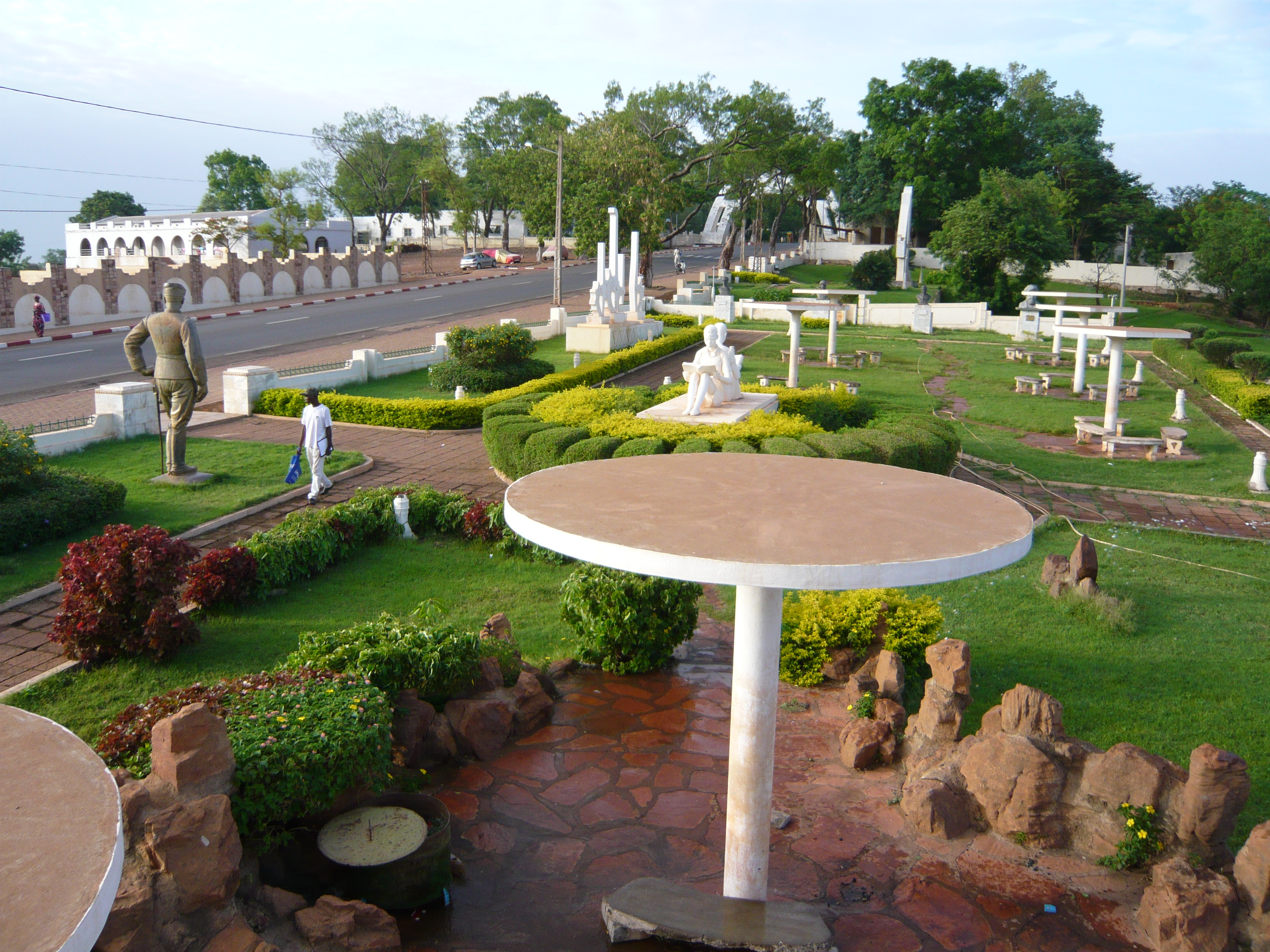
Bamako, Mali

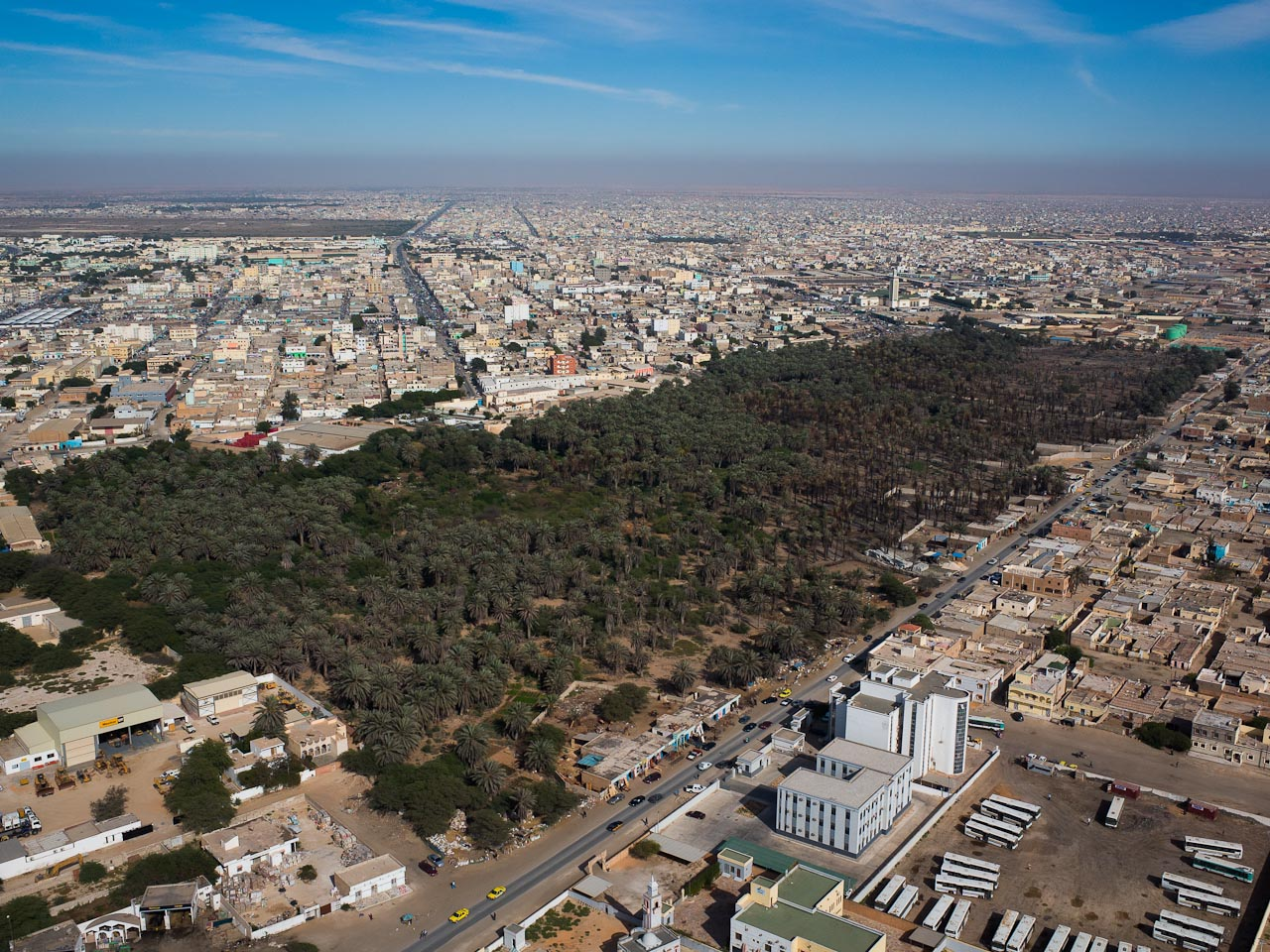
Nouakchott, Mauritania

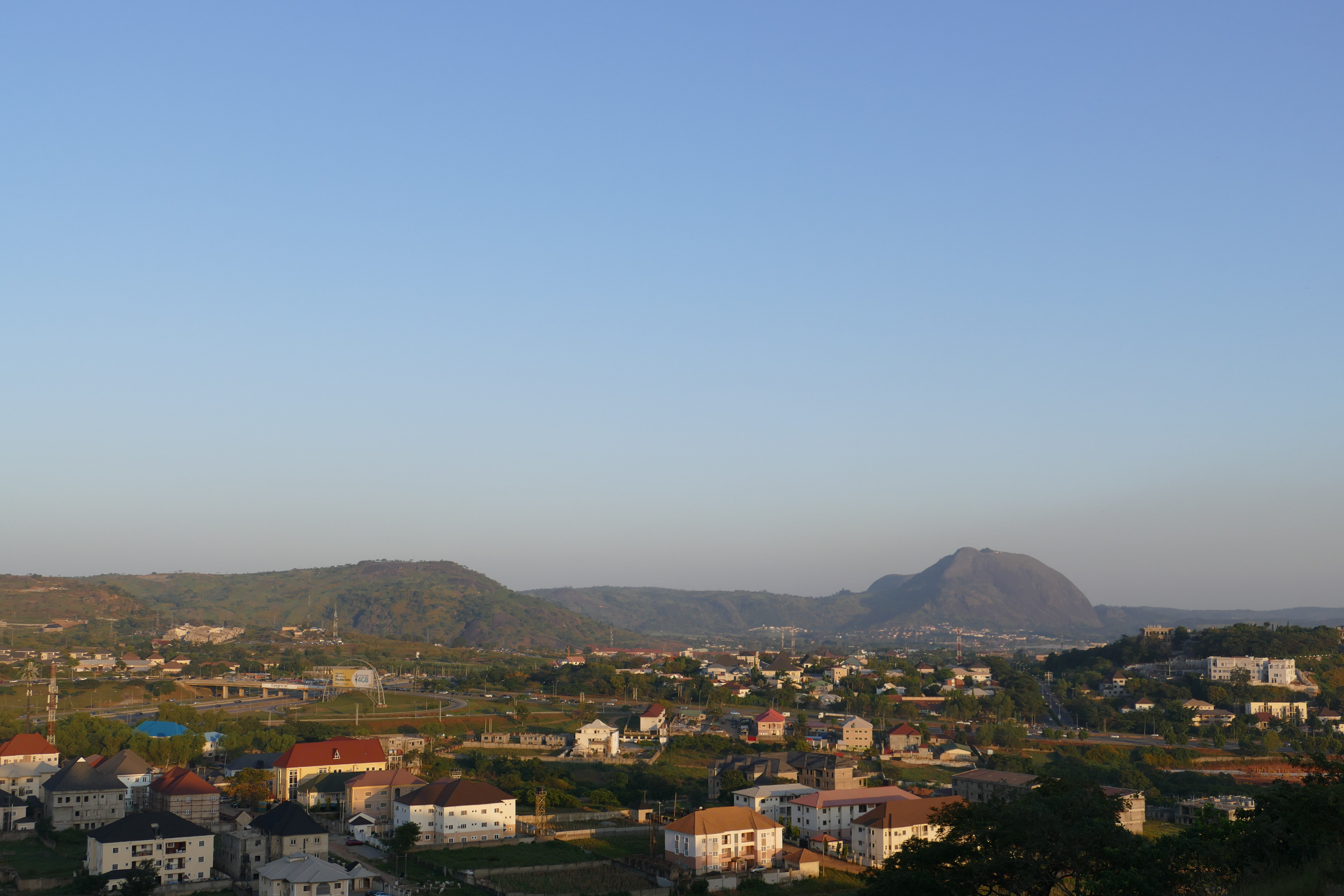
Abuja, Nigeria

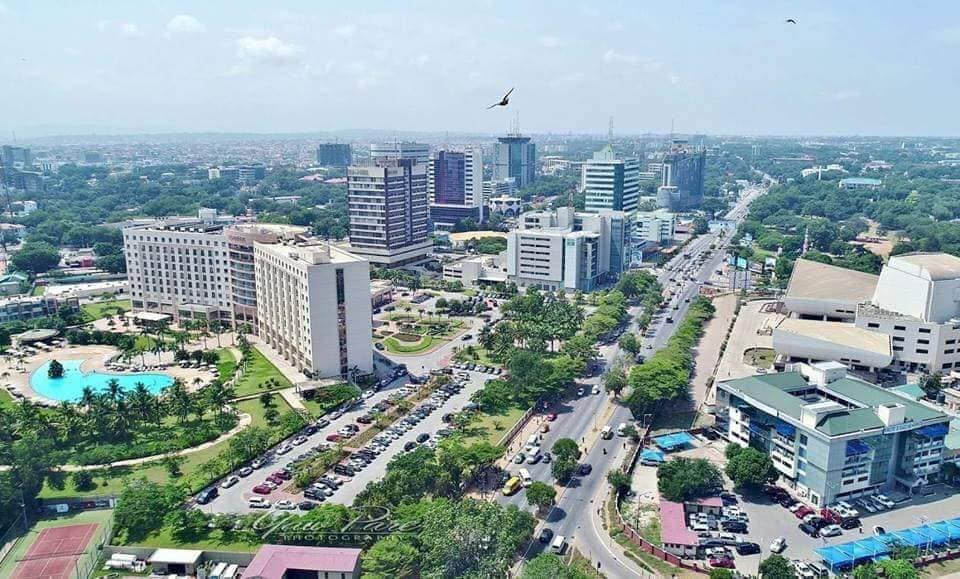
Accra, Ghana

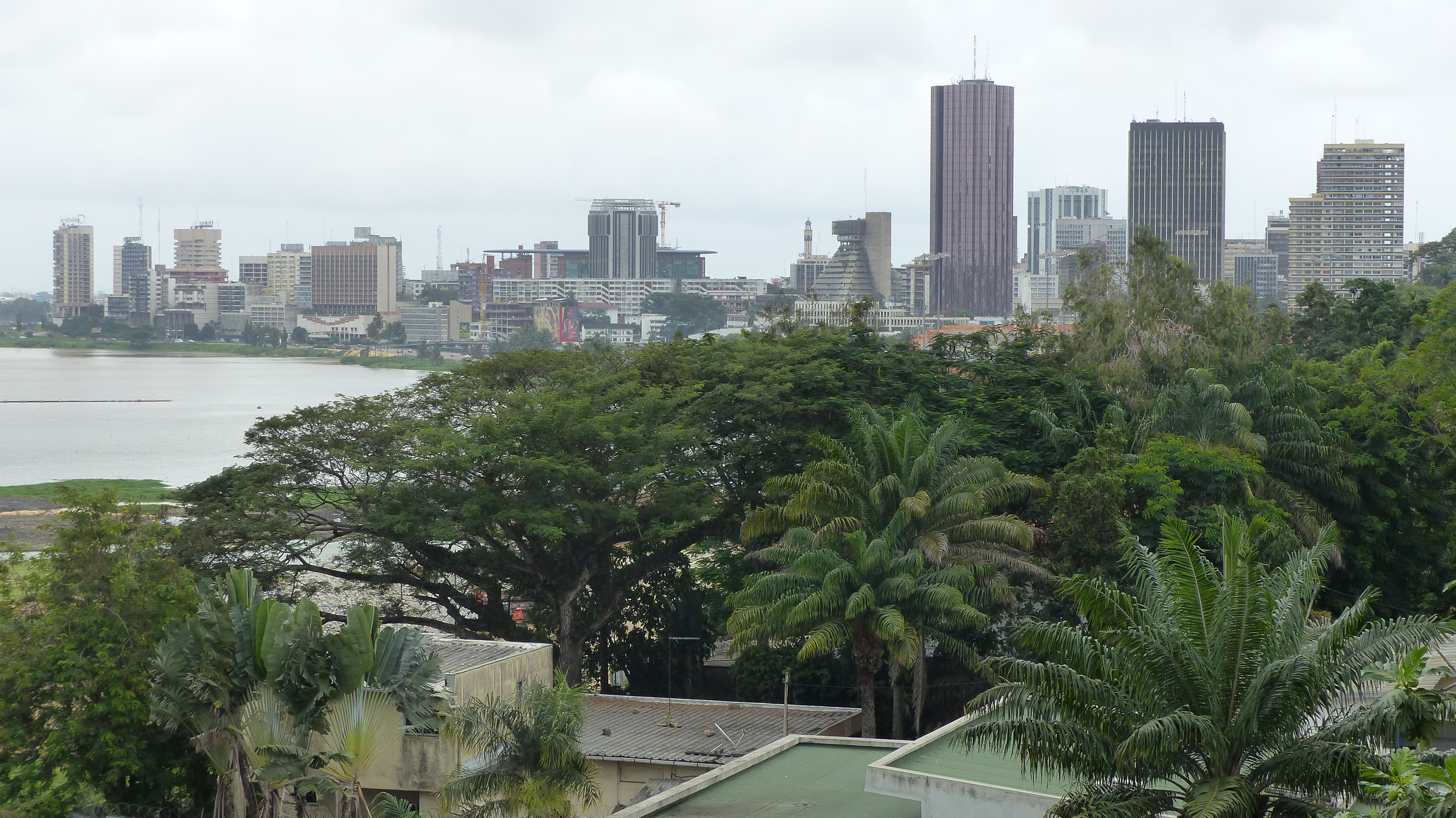
Abidjan, Ivory Coast

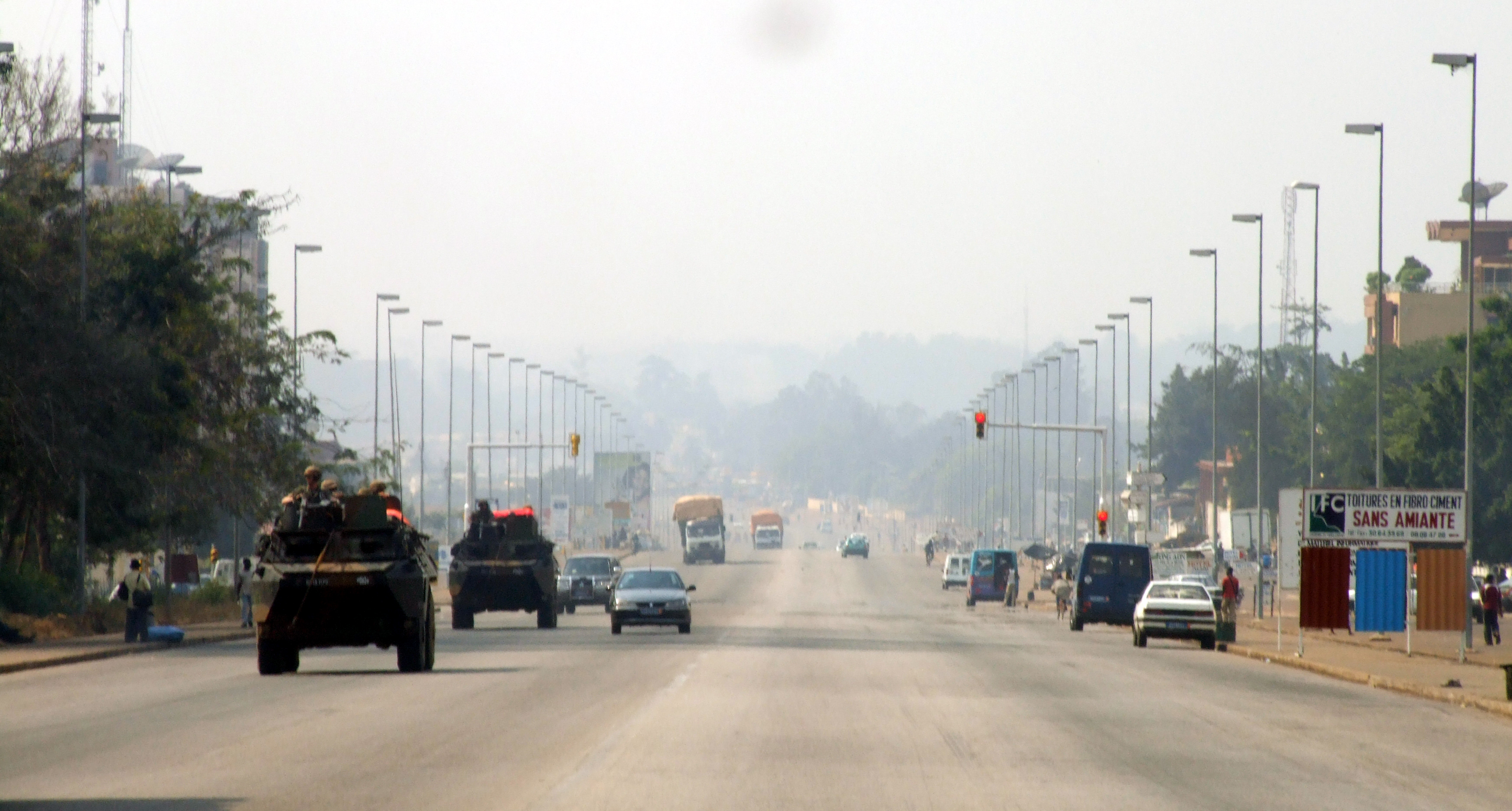
Yamoussoukro, Ivory Coast

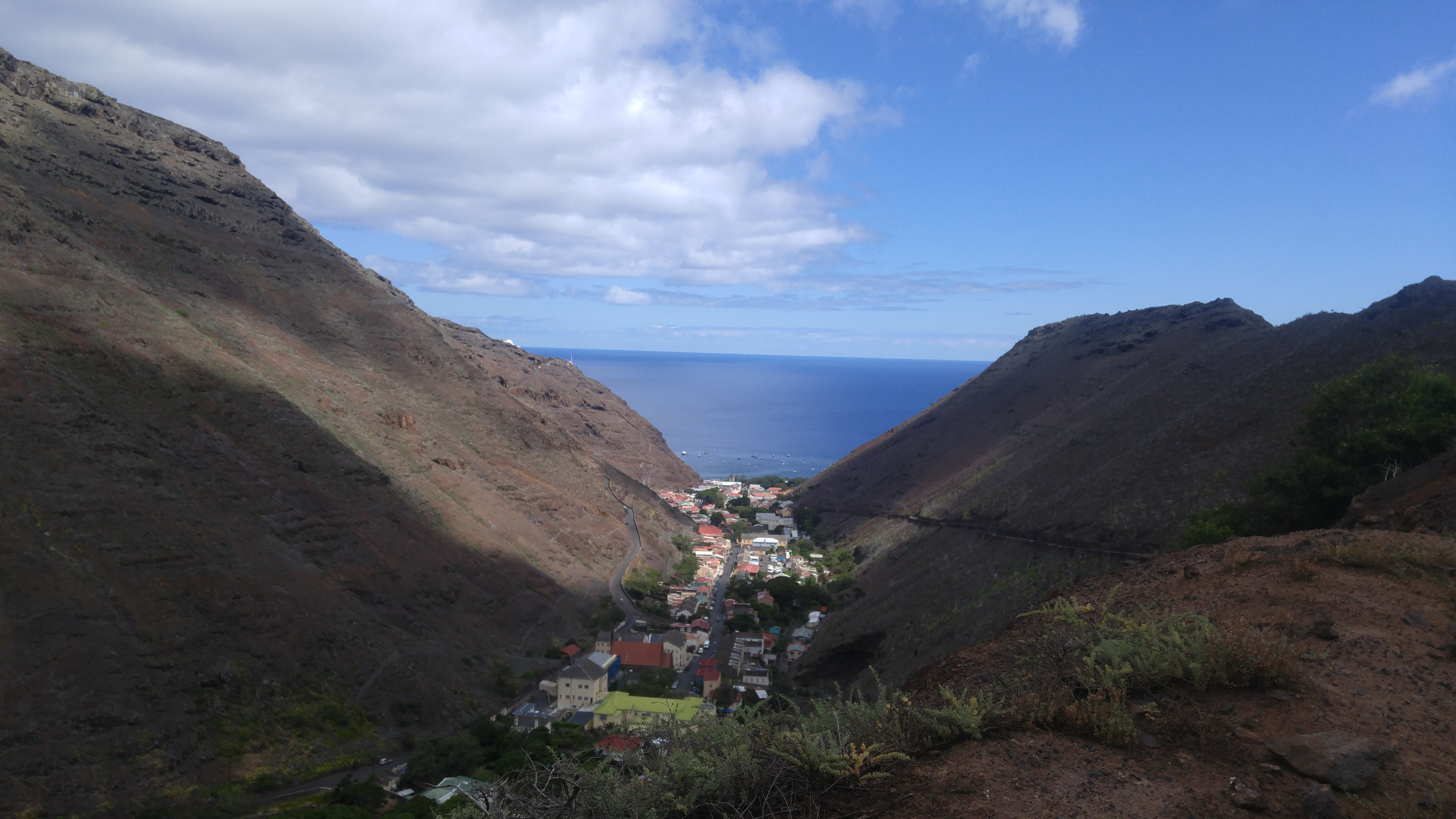
Jamestown, Saint Helena, Ascension and Tristan da Cunha

== See also ==
- African historiography
- Agroecology in West Africa
- Ajami – Arabic word for non-Arabs
- Ebola virus epidemic in West Africa – 2013–2016 major disease outbreak
- List of regions of Africa
- Manillas – West African money, a form of archaic money unique to West Africa
- N'Ko script – Manding languages alphabetic script
- North Africa – Northernmost region of Africa
- Nsibidi Script – Symbol system from Nigeria and Cameroon, an indigenously developed West African writing system
- Sub-Saharan Africa – Regions south of the Sahara
  - Central Africa – Core region of the African continent
  - East Africa – Subregion of Africa
  - Southern Africa – Southernmost region of Africa
- Vai syllabary – Writing system
- West African Craton – One of the five Precambrian cratons that make up the African Plate
- Western Sahara – Disputed territory in north-western Africa
- History of the Jews in West Africa
