= Afrique Victime =

2021 album by Mdou Moctar

Studio album by Mdou Moctar
- Released: 21 May 2021
- Studio: Multiple places
- Genres: Rock; blues; assouf
- Length: 41:23
- Label: Matador
- Producer: Michael Coltun

Mdou Moctar chronology
Ilana: The Creator (2019)	Afrique Victime (2021)	Funeral for Justice (2024)

Afrique Victime is the 2021 studio album by the Tuareg musician Mdou Moctar and his first on Matador Records. The album, which was released on 21 May 2021, is sung almost entirely in Tamasheq and some parts in French. Its lyrics concern sexism, war crimes, and colonialism. The album contains acoustic-rock music with some hints of local desert blues. Moctar and his band worked on Afrique Victime while he was touring for his 2019 album Ilana: The Creator, recording in studios and other places. To promote Afrique Victime, the band went on tour in 2022 and released a companion documentary about the creation of the album, showing the difficulties the band members faced by living on two continents—Africa and North America.

Afrique Victime incorporates local Saharan takamba music. The songs contain desert-like textures, with some fast-paced songs and some slow-paced songs. Most of the slow-paced songs were based on the subject of love. Other than desert-like textures, the songs have group harmonies, repeated riffs, and some incorporation from Jimi Hendrix's music. Just after the release, two other albums were released based on Afrique Victime, the deluxe edition and Afrique Refait, Afrique Refait contains remixes of the original songs and the Deluxe Edition contains an unreleased song, titled Nakanegh Dich.

Afrique Victime received positive reviews from international publications, several of which listed it as one of the best albums of 2021. The album was an important breakthrough for Moctar's career, according to Spin magazine. The album also gained international recognition, with multiple music publications placing it in their end-of-year lists. Some music publications compared the song to Jimi Hendrix's works, while others noted the fast-paced music and political lyrics.

== Background and production ==
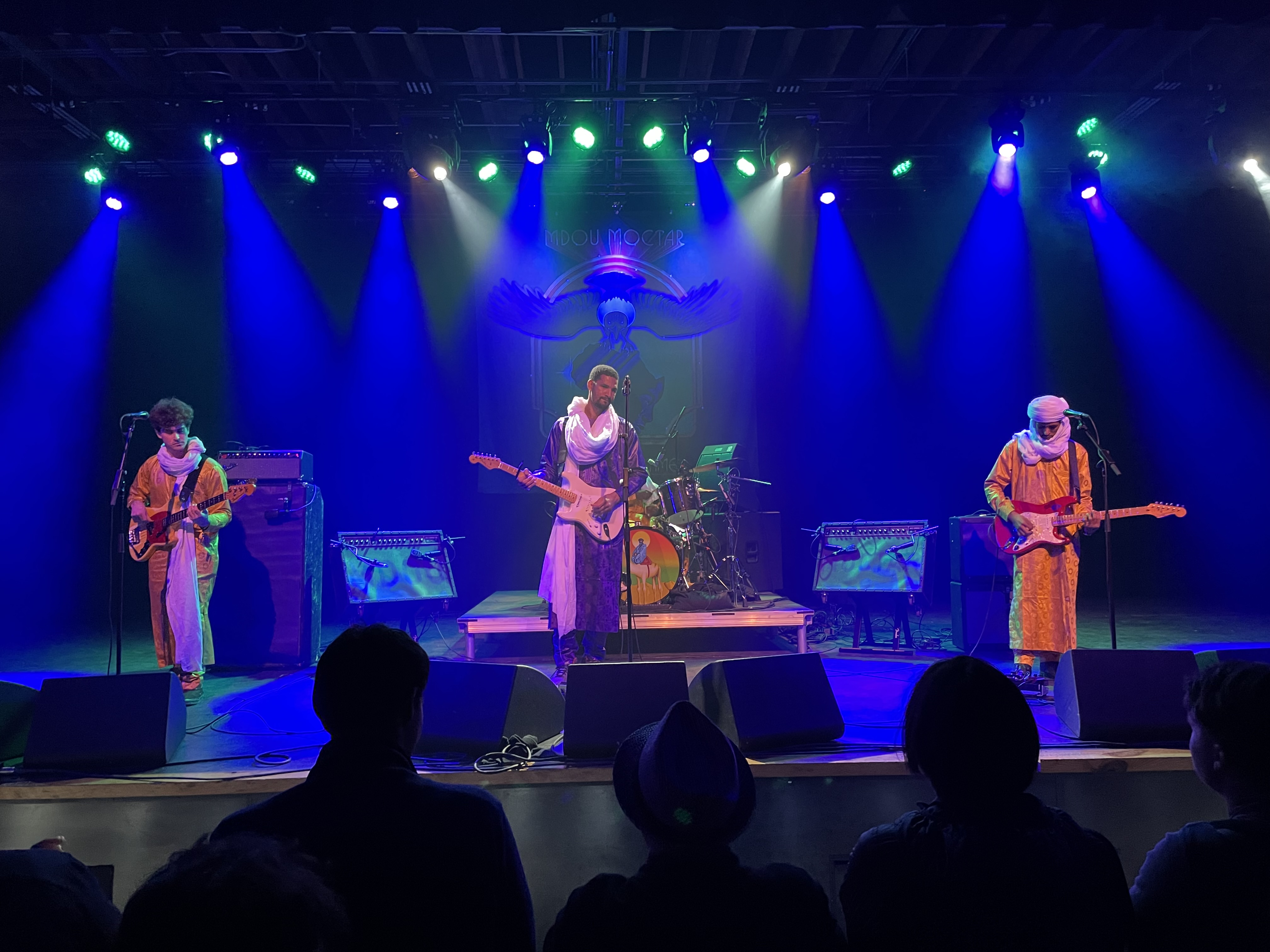
Mdou Moctar performing Afrique Victime

In 2019, after multiple meetings, Mdou Moctar vacated his recording contract with the record label Sahel Sounds; he signed with Matador Records. Afrique Victime was his first album with the label. It was recorded in Niamey, Niger. The album's genre is assouf ("desert blues"). Compared to Moctar's previous work, it features more African fusion than blues. Moctar sings mostly in the Tamasheq language, with some parts in French.

During Moctar's tour for his earlier album Ilana (The Creator), he started recording Afrique Victime during small breaks in the tour. Afrique Victime was made in several studios. Moctar told Reverb he is reluctant to spend excessive time in a studio so the band recorded the album in intervals over a few weeks. According to Moctar, studios worsen the listening experience because there is a person manipulating the recordings. Afrique Victime is Moctar's first album using studio equipment and professional sound engineers. Bass guitarist Mikey Coltun stated the band recorded the songs in one take. Other than politics, Moctar based the album on his environment. The songs were recorded in a variety of locations, including backstage spaces.

== Release ==
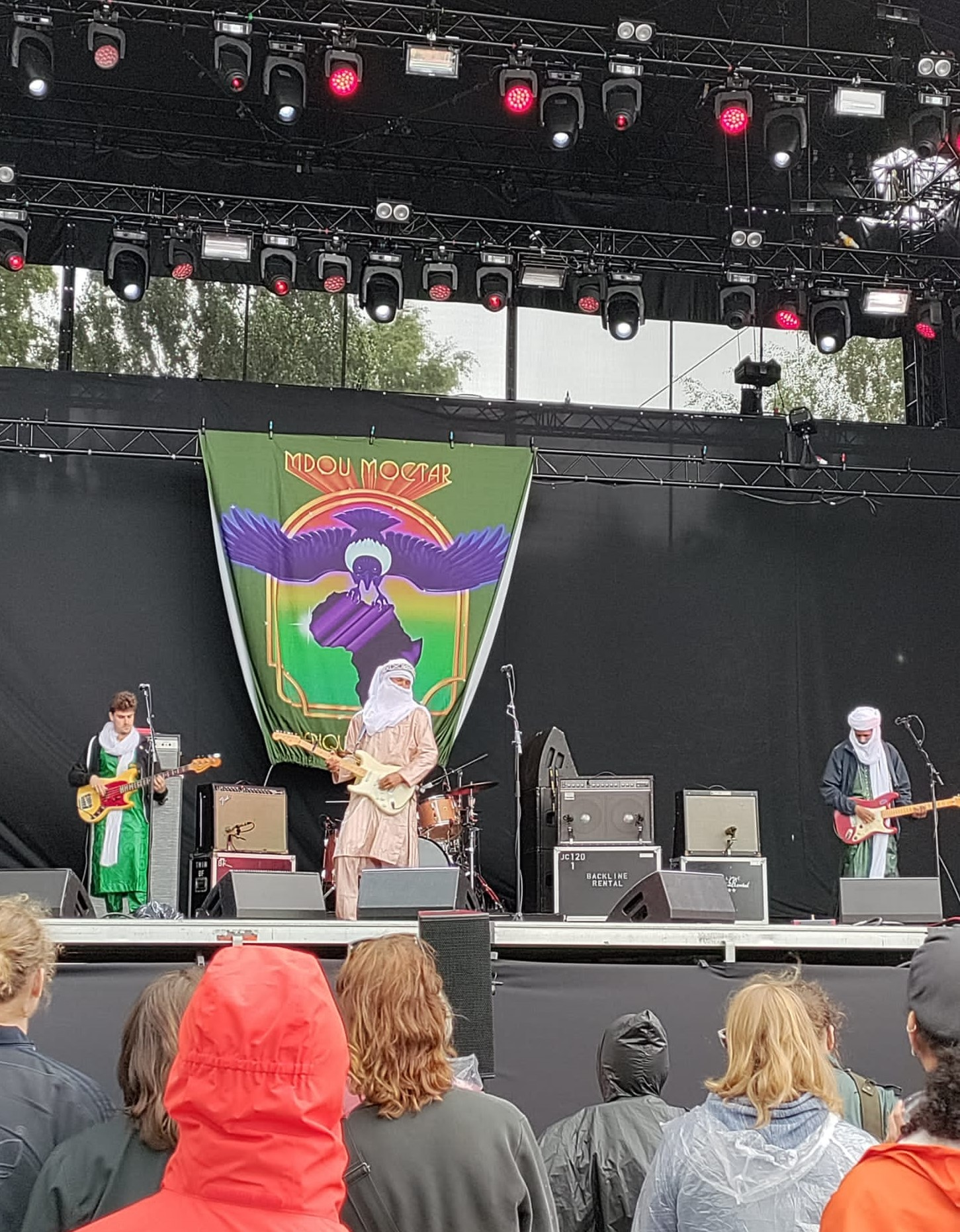
Mdou Moctar performing Afrique Victime at the 2022 Pori Jazz Festival in Pori, Finland.

Afrique Victime was released on 21 May 2021 on Matador Records, an American independent label. The album was released in digital, vinyl, and CD versions. In homage to Moctar's first albums, which listeners shared on phones using Bluetooth, he released a collector's-edition Nokia 6120 classic handset with Afrique Victime loaded on it.

Following the release, Moctar announced a 2022 tour, performing in the United States, Canada, England, Germany, France, Sweden, and other countries. The tour started on 27 February in North Carolina, US, and ended on 6 August in Poland.

=== Documentary ===
In September 2021, Matador Records released a 10-minute documentary about the creation of Afrique Victime. It was mainly shot by bassist Mikey Coltun, who had travelled to Niger to record the album. It shows the political events in Niger, including guerilla factions, which had prevented the band from touring. Moctar stated:

Many things are getting worse and it’s accelerating. Today, there are armed terrorists on motorbikes who are robbing people. A few weeks ago, they killed 213 people in villages, including young children, women, elderly people: ... I can't say all that in a song, that's why I'm looking for the kind of interview we have together today to get these messages across, that's what pushed me to make this album.

The documentary shows the band's experience of being trapped during the COVID-19 pandemic. Coltun is shown interviewing the other band members about their expertise in music.

== Political context ==
Afrique Victime talks about political issues, including war crimes and sexism. Moctar talks about political violence in his home country Niger, and problems and murder caused by motorcycle gangs. In the title song, Moctar hints at the history of Africa and colonialism. Moctar stated:

Afrique Victime is a message to all of the countries with money and power who come into Africa and kill the leaders who try to empower the people and lead revolutions. This pushes the area into danger and instability and emboldens the terrorists, and it’s the people who suffer and have no justice.

The album discusses the exploitation of Africa, including the Nigerien mining plunder and French imperialism. In an interview with the lifestyle magazine Dazed, Moctar said: "The US can kill people from the sky now, but pilots can’t eliminate 4,000 terrorists living in our desert? How can the influence of 52 countries not resolve that issue? How!" He talks about sparse food and electricity in his home country Niger. Moctar also said: "The key element is to get through the message, even subconsciously, that the continent of Africa is being victimized, and to understand what France is doing in terms of colonialism on the African continent and how France must help".

== Tracks ==
The songs on Afrique Victime combine traditional Saharan beats such as takamba. Many of the songs contain repeated riffs and handclapping.

=== Tracks 1–4 ===
"Chismiten", which was released on 7 October 2020, is in the Tamasheq language. The song starts with the sound of a rooster crowing, footsteps walking over crunchy land, and a psychedelic guitar melody. The other band members then join, completing the song. The song's music video includes cellphone footage of weddings and markets in Niger. Allmusic described "Chismiten" as "desert blues with fearless rock & roll swagger". Music website Exclaim! described its lyrics as a "parental scolding".

On 28 January 2019, "Taliat" was released. Moctar stated: "'Taliat' means woman, in our community, women are queens, they have a lot of power, that['s] why I use the term 'taliat' to talk about them. A woman in the Tuareg community has to be protected, but she also has to be treated as equal." The music video is a one-shot of band members Mdou Moctar, Mike Coltun, and Ahmoudou Madassane listening to the song in a car. Coltun said: "If you look closely, you can see Mdou singing along". The pop culture website Uproxx described the song as a "guitar-driven psychedelic rocker". Music magazine No Depression named it "a song of lost love" in which "Moctar’s sweeping, wah pedal-enhanced runs could break away from the rhythm section like a competitive horse race".

"Ya Habibti" is dedicated to Moctars' partner Layla, and Abdallah Og Oumbadagou. It includes clapping, acoustic guitar runs, mumbling percussion, and gritty acoustics. The track "Tala Tannam" ("Your Tears") features a guitar, percussion, gang vocals, and group harmonies. The music video was recorded in Niamey and directed by Cem Misirlioglu. Coltun said: "The video includes friends and family—in the Tuareg community in villages around Niamey as well as Hausa people from villages in the Dosso region". AllMusic described "Tala Tannam" as a "sweetly devotional love song" with a "soft, acoustic texture". The music website Stereogum described it as a "dusty acoustic reverie". According to Inews.co.uk, the track is a "sandstorm of noise", and Exclaim! said it has a "relatively relaxed mode".

=== Tracks 5–9 ===
"Untitled" includes a remix by the Kenyan guitar band Duma. "Asdikte Akal" is about Moctar's homeland and his love for it, and talks about Tuareg separatist violence. "Layla", which AllMusic described as "slinky", is named after Moctar's partner and talks about his love for her. The song is also dedicated to Nigerien musician Abdallah Og Oumbadagou. A review by Pitchfork described the song as acoustic blues. The song contains fills with drum machines and group harmonies.

"Afrique Victime", which starts with 20 seconds of silence and Moctar playing guitar, The song is about Niger's colonialism by the French. references the Voulet–Chanoine Mission, in which French troops killed Nigeriens and hanged their bodies on trees. AllMusic described the song as "the sonic and emotional centerpiece".

== Other editions ==
Afrique Victime has been released in multiple official editions, including a deluxe edition and Afrique Refait.

=== Deluxe edition ===
On 24 February 2022, Moctar released a deluxe edition with nine new songs in addition to the original nine. The deluxe edition includes "Nakanegh Dich", which was recorded with Rob Schnapf in Los Angeles, California, United States, and was cut from the final version of the original album. It was the first Moctar song to include a wah-wah pedal. According to Coltun, Moctar called Schnapf into the studio to control the pedal with his feet while Moctar played a guitar solo.

=== Afrique Refait ===
In 2022, Moctar released Afrique Refait, an album of remixes of Afrique Victime songs by other artists. The songs include a remixed version of Taliat by Rey Sapienz and MC Dougis, and multiple reworkings of Chismiten.

== Reception ==
Professional ratings
Aggregate scores
Source	Rating
AnyDecentMusic?	8.2/10
Metacritic	86/100
Review scores
Source	Rating
AllMusic	4/5 stars
Exclaim!	9/10
The Guardian	4/5 stars
The Line of Best Fit	8/10
MusicOMH	4.5/5 stars
Paste	9.0/10
Pitchfork	8.4/10
Rolling Stone	4/5 stars
Uncut	4.5/5 stars
Under the Radar	8/10

Afrique Victime was met with widespread critical acclaim. The review aggregator Metacritic, with a normalized rating of 100 from multiple publications, gave the album an average score of 86 based 17 music publications and reviews.

The website OkayAfrica compared Afrique Victime with the works of Jimi Hendrix. The British magazine Our Culture Mag said on the album, there is a "palpable sense of urgency and aliveness" to Moctar's music that does not just "speak to the people" but "resonates far beyond". AllMusic described the album as the "most conclusive example of Moctar's multidimensional talents to date". Guitar World described the title track as "a jaw-dropping display of intricately crafted electric guitar lines and fierce guitar playing prowess". Music website Backseat Mafia described the album as a "touchstone" for the rejuvenation of African music and Western rock.

Afrique Victime was ranked the 31st best album of 2021 on Metacritic. The British music magazine DJ Mag chose Afrique Victime as its album of the month. Several media outlets added it to their end-of-year best-album lists, including The New York Times, Pitchfork, The Guardian, Rolling Stone, and Consequence.

== Track listing ==
All tracks are written by Mdou Moctar.

Afrique Victime track listing
No.	Title	Length
1.	"Chismiten"	4:58
2.	"Taliat"	3:48
3.	"Ya Habibti"	3:31
4.	"Tala Tannam"	5:38
5.	"Untitled"	1:25
6.	"Asdikte Akal"	4:31
7.	"Layla"	4:26
8.	"Afrique Victime"	7:25
9.	"Bismilahi Atagah"	5:36
Total length:		41:23

Afrique Victime (Deluxe Edition bonus tracks)
No.	Title	Length
1.	"Chismiten (Demo)"	4:23
2.	"Taliat (Live)"	5:48
3.	"Ya Habibti (Demo)"	1:44
4.	"Tala Tannam (Demo)"	1:16
5.	"Asdikte Akal (Live)"	3:15
6.	"Layla (Live)"	4:14
7.	"Afrique Victime (Live)"	4:33
8.	"Bishmilahi Atagah (Demo)"	4:51
9.	"Nakanegh Dich"	4:38

== Personnel ==
Mdou Moctar

- Mahamadou 'Mdou Moctar' Souleymane – lead guitar, vocals
- Ahmoudou Madassane – rhythm guitar, backing vocals
- Michael Coltun – bass guitar, backing vocals, drum machines, production
- Souleymane Ibrahim – drums, percussion, backing vocals

Additional personnel

- Robert Beatty – artwork

== Charts ==
Chart performance for Afrique Victime
Chart (2021)	Peak position
Belgian Albums (Ultratop Flanders)	180
Dutch Albums (Album Top 100)	92
Scottish Albums (Official Charts)	31
UK Album Sales (OCC)	36
UK Album Downloads (Official Charts)	57
UK Physical Albums (OCC)	36
UK Vinyl Albums (OCC)	22
UK Record Store (OCC)	14
UK Independent Albums (Official Charts)	16
UK Independent Album Breakers (OCC)	2
