= Music from Saharan Cellphones =

Compilation album by various artists
- Released: December 2, 2011
- Genres: African popular music; Afrobeats; coupé-décalé; desert blues; raï; shaabi; Maghreb pop; Malian hip-hop
- Languages: French, Arabic
- Label: Sahel Sounds

Music from Saharan Cellphones is a compilation album released by Sahel Sounds of different songs by various musicians from Western and Sub-Saharan Africa.

== Background ==
Music from Saharan Cellphones contains an assortment of different songs by various African musicians from Algeria, Niger, Mauritania, Nigeria, Morocco, Mali and the Ivory Coast. Despite their popularity within the region, the tracks which appear on the album achieved little or no commercial release outside the Sahara.

The album was initiated by Sahel Sounds, a Portland-based record label founded in 2009 that specializes in music from the southern part of the Sahara desert. As a way to accurately unveil songs popular amongst local West African residents to audiences abroad, the music was digitally extracted off cellular phone memory cards containing stored .mp3 files known to circulate the area via peer-to-peer bluetooth file sharing. In the process of the album's production, Sahel Sounds tracked down each of the featured composers in order to obtain proper permissions and pay them for using their music. Christopher Kirkley, the founder of Sahel Sounds and producer of the album reported that the artists on Music from Saharan Cellphones were given 60% of its proceed sales.

== Music ==
Music from Saharan Cellphones showcases a diverse mixture of different contemporary African musical styles prevalent across the Sahara.

The featured artists consist of both individual musicians and musical ensembles. Songs on the album are exclusively sung in either Arabic and African French depending on the specific song. Some of these singers make use of the Auto-Tune effect and some vocally perform by rapping while others use a traditional singing style.

== Track listing ==
No.	Title	Artist	Length
1.	"Tinariwen"	Group Anmataff	6:16
2.	"Abandé"	Yeli Fuzzo	3:31
3.	"Alghafiat"	Amanar	6:37
4.	"Guetna"	Negib Ould Ngainich	1:14
5.	"Yereyira"	Papito (featuring Iba One)	4:48
6.	"Tahoultine"	Mdou Moctar	5:37
7.	"Moribiyassa"	Kaba Blon	3:40
8.	"Faroter"	Joskar & Flamzy	5:27
9.	"Aicha"	Bayta Ag Bay	6:08

== Legacy ==
Music from Saharan Cellphones was followed up by a second compilation album of the same concept, Music from Saharan Cellphones: Volume 2 – released in 2013. The record label furthered the style on the 2022 compilation album Music from Saharan WhatsApp.

The songs "Yereyira", "Abandé", and "Tinariwen" (from Volume 1) with "Hwa Heda" (from Volume 2) were sampled by experimental hip-hop trio Death Grips for their songs "Get Got", "Double Helix", "Punk Weight", and "Fuck That" from their 2012 album The Money Store.

== See also ==
- Music from Saharan WhatsApp
- Music of North Africa
  - Music of Algeria
- Music of West Africa
  - Music of Ivory Coast
  - Music of Mali
  - Music of Mauritania
  - Music of Niger
  - Music of Nigeria
- Music of Western Sahara
- Berber music
- Ethnomusicology
- Tuareg people
