= Music of Niger =

Video footage of a Guérewol performance

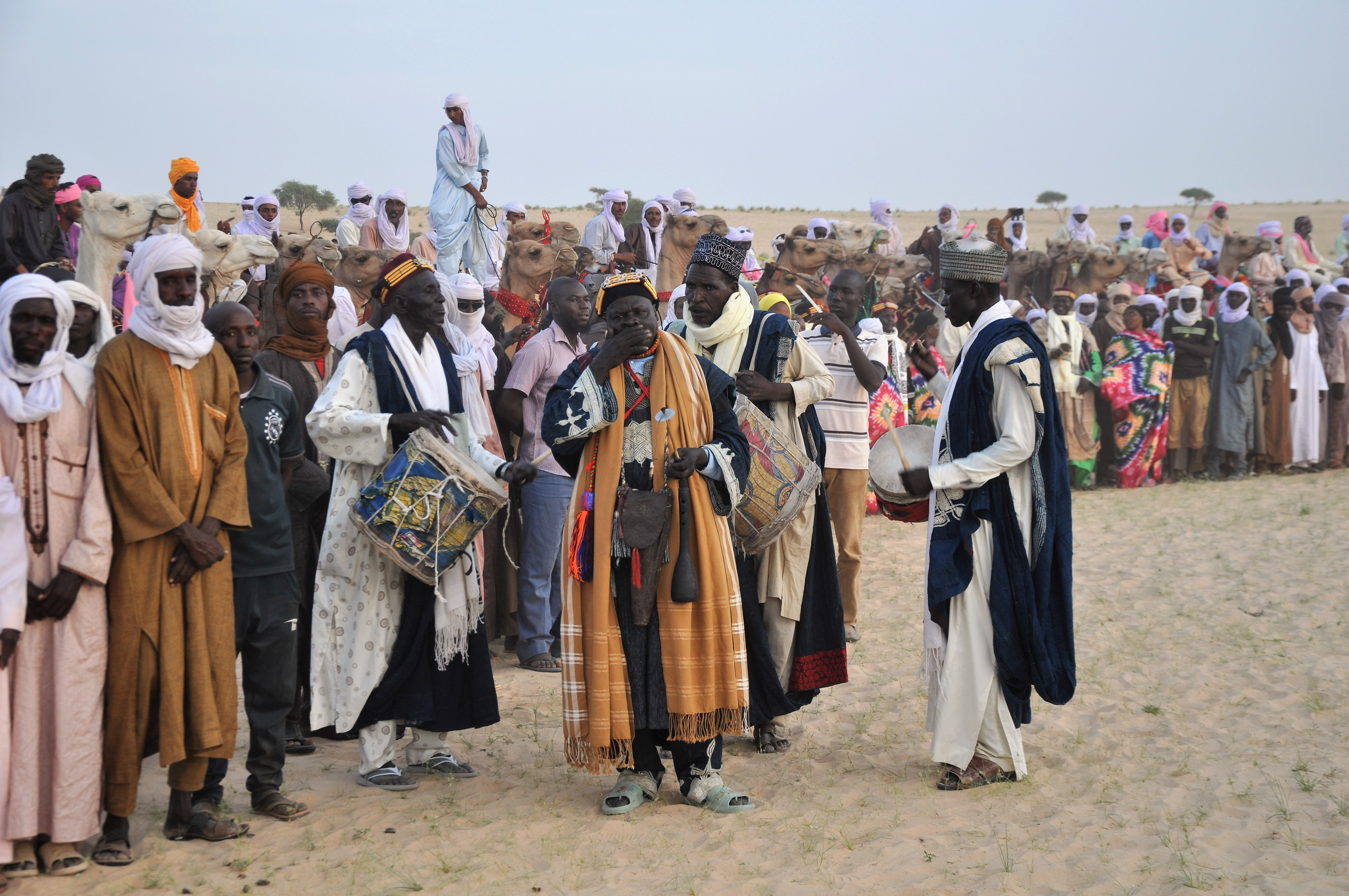
Toubou musicians at a formal ceremony

The Music of Niger has developed from the musical traditions of a mix of ethnic groups: Hausa, the Zarma–Songhai, Tuareg, Fula, Kanuri, Toubou, Diffa Arabs and Gurma, as well as the Boudouma from Lake Chad.

Most traditions existed quite independently in French West Africa but have begun to form a mixture of styles since the 1960s. While Niger's popular music has had little international attention (in comparison with the music of neighbors Mali or Nigeria), traditional and new musical styles have flourished since the end of the 1980s.

The Hausa, who make up over half of the country's population, use the duma for percussion and the molo (a lute) in their Griot traditions, along with the Ganga, alghaïta (shawm) and kakaki (trumpet) for martial, state, and ceremonial occasions. These uses are typified by the ceremonial usage of large trumpets to mark the authority of the Sultanate of Damagaram in the southeast Zinder area (see Hausa music).

Over 20% of Niger's population are Zarma people, while the Tuareg and Fulani both number around a million in the early 21st century, somewhat less than 10% each. The Kanuri are just over 4% while the Toubou, Diffa and Gurma are all small populations of less than a half percent each.

The Zarma inhabit the region around the capital, Niamey. They play, generally solo, a variety of lutes (xalam or molo), flutes and fiddles and, like the Fula, carry on the griot tradition of caste-based praise singers and musicians. Songhai traditional music was the topic of extensive study in the late colonial and early independence period.

The Tuareg of the north are known for romantic, informal sung/spoken love poetry performed by both men and women, with voices accompanied by clapping, tinde drums (in women's songs) and a one-stringed viol (in men's songs) (see Tuareg music).

The Fula and Wodaabe, a nomadic desert subgroup of Fula, practise group singing accompanied by clapping, stamping and bells. The Wodaabe Gerewol festival is one example of this repeating, hypnotic and percussive choral tradition. The Beriberi too are known for complex polyphony singing. To get an overall understanding of traditional music and instruments in Niger visit the traditional instrument museum at the CFPM Taya in Niamey. An amazing collection of drums, string instruments and flutes from all tribes in Niger.

== Modern Nigerien music ==
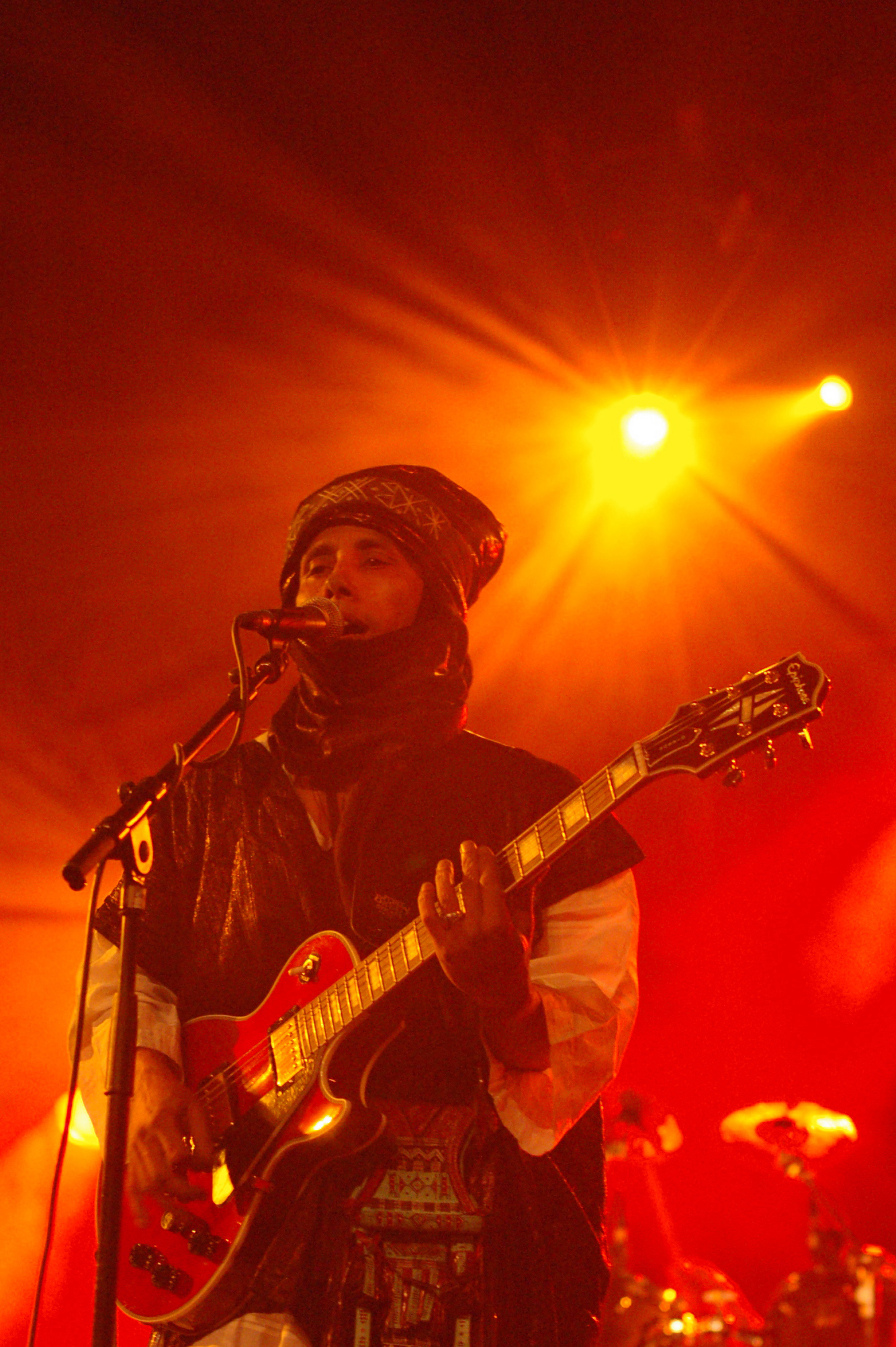
Nigerien Tuareg musician Moussa ag Keyna performing in 2007.

Music for the purpose of entertainment has not been readily accepted by the Nigerien government, though restrictions have loosened since the death of Seyni Kountché in 1987. A competitive music festival called the Prix Dan Gourmou helped inspire a musical renaissance in the country, led by people like Alassane Dante. The Centre for Musical Training and Promotion was founded in 1990, furthering this process, using a grant from the European Development Fund. Musicians formed bands to seek fame both domestically and internationally, with the most successful being the group Takeda, formed by Reggae singer Adams Junior, Saâdou Bori, Fati Mariko, Mamoudou Abdousalam, Sani Aboussa, John Sofakolé, Moussa Poussy and Yacouba Moumouni.

In the mid-1990s, record producer Ibrahima Sylla traveled to Niamey and ended up signing Poussy and Saadou Bori. He has since also helped release records from Adam's Junior and from Mamar Kassey, perhaps the best-known Nigerien group outside the country, who combine traditional Songhai styles and modern jazz.

The band Etran Finatawa ("the stars of tradition"), consisting of Tuareg and Wodaabe members, formed in 2004 at the Festival in the Desert. Between 2004 and 2015 Etran Finatawa toured the globe with performances in over 45 countries.

Since 2008 Tal National has been the most popular modern band in Niger. They are based in Niamey. Their 2008 album A-Na Waya reached the top of the charts in Niger and earned the band numerous awards. In 2013 they signed a worldwide record deal with Fat Cat Records for the album "Kaani".

Another popular band, Groupe Sogha, created in 2004, has been a popular neo-traditional musical group that combines traditional and modern instruments in its music composed of ten members, five instrumentalists, three singers, and two dancers. The group was Niger's music ambassador for the fifth Francophone Games in Niamey. Sogha has two albums to its credit recorded under the artistic direction of the maestro Boncana Maiga.

=== "Tuareg Blues" ===
Tuareg Blues is perhaps the most internationally known of Tuareg musical styles. Growing out of the refugee camps to the 1990s Tuareg insurgencies, Tuareg Blues have been exported to Europe, most notably by the Malian band Tinariwen. Niger born Tuareg Blues artists include Les Filles de Illighadad, the pioneering guitarist Abdallah ag Oumbadougou from Agadez and his band Takrist n'Akal, Hasso Akotey and Tidawt from Agadez, Group Bombino also from Agadez, Moussa ag Keyna's group Toumast, Alhousseini Anivolla from Agadez, Mdou Moctar, and the performer Mouma Bob.

=== Rap Nigerien ===
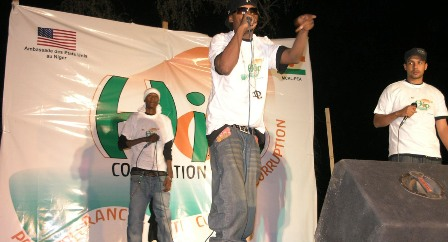
The Black Daps perform in Niamey, January 2009.

Rap Nigerien, a mélange of different languages spoken in Niger, appeared at the end of the 1990s. The music is relaxed and mellow, mixed with the sounds of traditional musical styles from the many ethnicities in the country. It grew into an interesting sociologic phenomenon, expanding what was expected of domestic popular entertainment. The young and disaffected have used Rap Nigerien to give voice to popular complaints – forced marriages, child labor, corruption, poverty, and other problems.

Rap Nigerien also spontaneously appeared in UNICEF grassroots cultural programs, one of the few outlets for large-scale performance in the country. In August 2004, UNICEF opened the competition "Scene Ouverte Rap", where 45 new groups were selected from among over 300 entrants. The competition performances took place at the Centre Culturel Franco – Nigerien between the 5 and 14 August.

A large number of Rap Nigerien acts grew out of this scene and remain active, with the best-known being Awn, Tchakey, Kaidan Gaskya, Wass Wong and Djoro G. Newer groups, such as Haskey Klan, Kamikaz, Rass Idris and Metaphor, have since appeared.
