= At Pioneer Works =

Live album by Les Filles de Illighadad
- Released: July 9, 2021
- Recorded: October 2019
- Venue: Pioneer Works (Red Hook, Brooklyn)
- Genre: Tuareg blues
- Label: Sahel Sounds
- Producers: Christopher Kirkley; Ben Parrish; Justin Pyre (co.)

Les Filles de Illighadad chronology
Eghass Malan (2017)	At Pioneer Works (2021)

At Pioneer Works is the third record and first live recording by Niger-based quartet Les Filles de Illighadad, released through Sahel Sounds in July 2021. It was recorded in Brooklyn at the Pioneer Works cultural center.

== Critical reception ==
Professional ratings
Review scores
Source	Rating
Mojo	4/5 stars
musicOMH	4/5 stars
Pitchfork	8.0/10
Spectrum Culture	80%
Uncut	7/10

David Renard of The New York Times described the music as "repetitive and hypnotic... convey[ing] something spiritual and solemn," but noted that it also "transmits a sense of joy and playfulness that goes back to the music's roots in village life."

In a review for Mojo, David Hutcheon praised the group's "insistent beat and the ragged interplay between the guitarists that is seriously (Warhol-era) Velvet Underground in its sting."

Bekki Bemrose of musicOMH called At Pioneer Works the band's "definitive record to date," and stated that it "feels timeless and sacred," capturing "their tenderness, inventiveness and profound talent."

Pitchfork's Allison Hussey wrote: "Notes seem to spring off of one another on every song, each tightly wound coil bouncing and unspooling in directions that are delightful to follow... The group's music imagines longstanding traditions while channeling the enthusiasm of audacious, self-determined freedom."

Writing for Spectrum Culture, Pat Padua described the album as "mesmerizing," and commented: "in this spirited live performance, you can hear Les Filles open up their hearts."

A writer for Aquarium Drunkard remarked: "Melodically, there is plenty of room to breathe. Each instrument... fills in what it needs to organically. Nothing is overworked, just enhanced."

== Track listing ==
No.	Title	Length
1.	"Surbajo"	5:50
2.	"Eghass Malan"	5:45
3.	"Telilit"	11:06
4.	"Chakalan"	8:18
5.	"Inssegh Inssegh"	8:59
6.	"Irriganan"	6:51

== Personnel ==
All credits adapted from the record's Bandcamp page.

Les Filles de Illighadad

- Fatou Seidi Ghali - vocals, guitar
- Alamnou Akrouni - vocals, percussion
- Amaria Hamadlher - guitar, percussion
- Abdoulaye Madassane - vocals, percussion
