= Kassey =

Kassey is a name. People with the name include:

== Surname ==
- Moussa Seybou Kassey (1959-2020), Nigerien politician
- Adnan El Kassey (born 1939), Iraqi professional wrestler

== Given name ==
- Kassey Kallman (born 1992), American footballer

== See also ==
- Mamar Kassey, Nigerian band named after legendary warrior
