= Les Filles de Illighadad =

Nigerien desert blue band

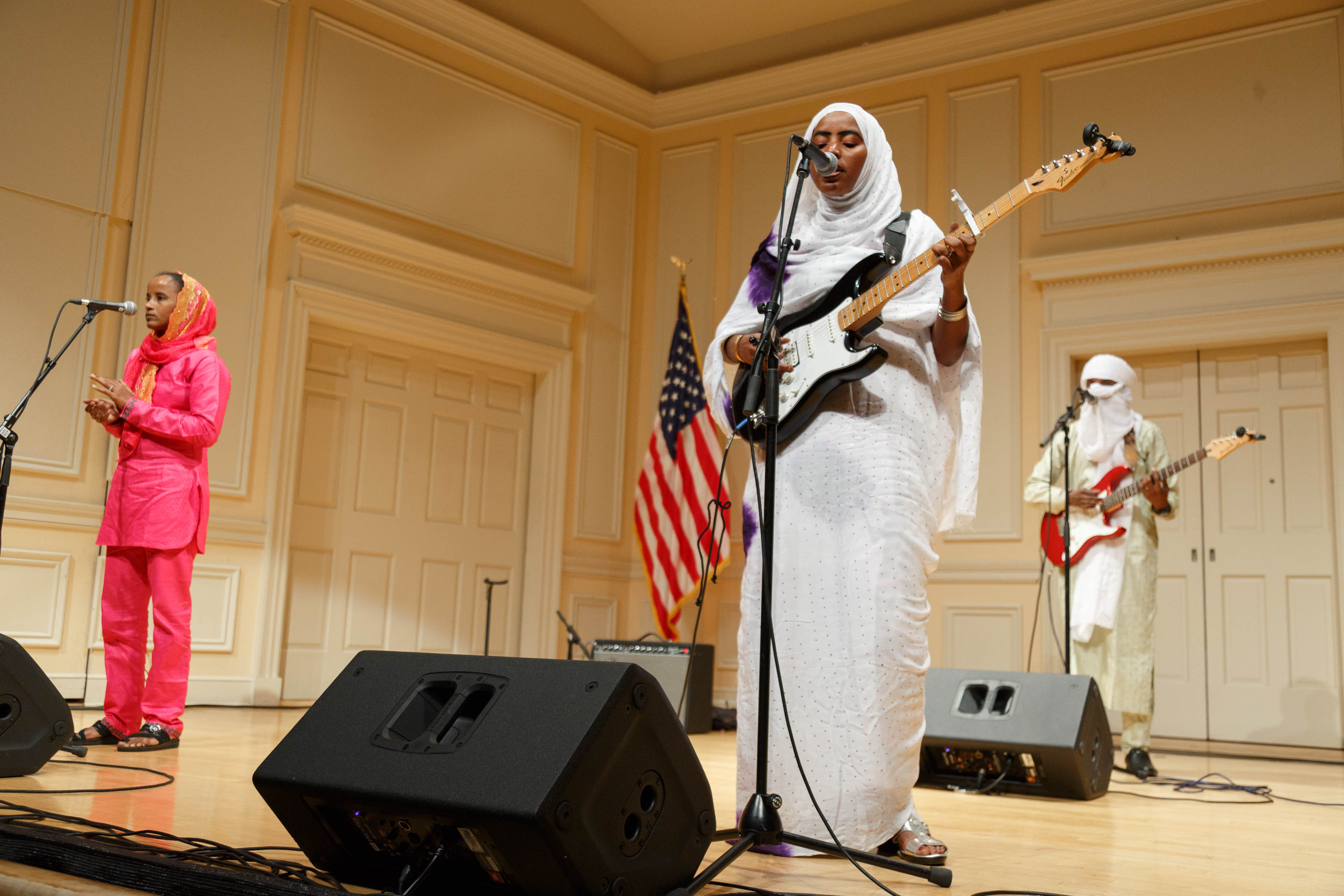
- Les Filles de Illighadad perform at the Library of Congress in 2019

Background information
- Origin: Illighadad, Niger
- Genres: Tuareg music, Tishoumaren
- Years active: 2014-present
- Labels: Sahel Sounds
- Members: Fatou Seidi Ghali; Alamnou Akrouni; Fatimata Ahmadelher; Abdoulay Madassane; Ahmoudou Madassane
- Past members: Mariama Salah Aswan
- Website: sahelsounds.com/artists/les-filles-de-illighadad/

Les Filles de Illighadad are a Tuareg band founded by Fatou Seidi Ghali in Illighadad, a village in the Sahara Desert in Niger. Ghali, it is claimed, is the first Tuareg woman to play guitar professionally.

== History ==
Ghali taught herself to play on her brother's guitar. While women did perform music among her people, they didn't play guitar; rather, they played a style of music called tende, centered on a drum made with mortar and pestles, a style that influenced Tuareg guitar playing but isn't generally part of the music played by Tuareg men. Les Filles de Illighadad incorporate tende with guitar playing, "asserting the power of women to innovate using the roots of traditional Tuareg music". Ghali usually plays with her cousin, Alamnou Akrouni.

Ghali and the Filles have recorded three albums with Christopher Kirkley for his Sahel Sounds label. Recordings were made in the open air, and consisted of recordings of Ghali in the daytime and the Filles playing in the village at night. Following the release of the first album, the Filles did a short European tour, and Ghali used her earnings to buy more cattle. Mariama Salah Aswan left the group to begin a family; she was replaced by the second Tuareg woman guitarist, Fatimata Ahmadelher. The group toured in the US in the fall of 2019, playing in New York and Detroit, as a four-piece band consisting of Ghali, Akirwini, Ahmadelher, and Gahli's brother, Abdoulaye Madassane, on rhythm guitar. The album At Pioneer Works was recorded at the Pioneer Works arts center in Red Hook, Brooklyn, in October 2019 during this tour.

The band's music was described by Amanda Petrusich as "heavy, meditative, and tender", reminiscent of "players like R. L. Burnside or Otha Turner, who were directly influenced brought to the American South by enslaved Africans". Writing for The New York Times, David Renard stated that the group's sound "takes the Tuareg guitar music sometimes referred to as desert blues, brought to the West by breakthrough artists from the region like Mdou Moctar, Bombino and Tinariwen, and fuses it with tendé... The result is repetitive and hypnotic, conveying something spiritual and solemn... but also transmits a sense of joy and playfulness that goes back to the music's roots in village life."

== Members ==
- Fatou Seidi Ghali - guitar, tende
- Alamnou Akrouni - vocals, calabash
- Fatimata Ahmadelher - guitar
- Abdoulay Madassane - bass
- Ahmoudou Madassane - vocals, guitar

=== Former members ===
- Mariama Salah Aswan - vocals

== Discography ==
- Les Filles de Illighadad (Sahel Sounds, 2016)
- Eghass Malan (Sahel Sounds, 2017)
- At Pioneer Works (Sahel Sounds, 2021)
