= Ilana (The Creator) =

Studio album by Mdou Moctar
- Released: March 29, 2019
- Recorded: Detroit, Michigan, US; Niger
- Genre: Desert blues; psychedelic rock
- Length: 38:58
- Language: Berber (Tamasheq)
- Label: Sahel Sounds
- Producer: Mikey Coltun; Christopher Kirkley

Mdou Moctar chronology
Sousoume Tamachek (2017)	Ilana (The Creator) (2019)	Afrique Victime (2021)

“For 48 years France has exploited the uranium in our country, and yet we still don’t have roads, medicines and in many places there is no water or electricity. France says we are independent now but we have no independence, we are modern slaves. They say this is an Africa problem, but we have had enough of what France is doing to us; it’s as if we’re still in the 15th century.”

— Mdou Moctar

Ilana (The Creator) is the 2019 studio album by Nigerien desert blues band Mdou Moctar. The album was recorded in Detroit and was released by the record label Sahel Sounds. The album was the first where guitarist Mdou Moctar turned his solo musical project into a full band, and has received positive reviews by critics.

== Background and recording ==
Mdou Moctar released his debut album, Anar, in 2008, and rereleased it before creating the soundtrack of Akounak Tedalat Taha Tazoughai. Ilana is Moctar's third album. In 2019, Mdou Moctar turned into an official band, adding bassist Mike Coltun, drummer Mazawadje Aboubacar Ibrahim, and guitarist Ahmoudou Madassane. The album was his first studio-recorded album.

The album was recorded in Detroit with studio producer Chris Koltay. According to the record label Sahel Sounds, they "lived in the studio for a week, [and] play[ed] into the early hours". After recording the songs, the band returned to Niger to add additional guitar solos, overdubs of percussion, and a "general ambiance of Agadez wedding vibes".

== Tracks ==
"Kamane Tarhanin" was released as a lead single. Music website Stereogum called it "hypnotic, plung[ing] forward with a spontaneous urgency". The song has various chanting sounds, with "sounds of Saharan tradition". Moctar said, "I’m just an ambassador, like a messenger of music, telling what is happening in my world".

== Release and touring ==
A brief tour of the United States to promote the album started in the Andy Warhol Museum, Pittsburgh, Pennsylvania, on March 28, 2019, and ended in Hotel Vegas, Austin, Texas on April 25, 2019.

== Reception ==
According to the review aggregator Metacritic, Ilana (The Creator) received "universal acclaim" based on a weighted average score of 88 out of 100 from 5 critic scores. J. D. of The Economist wrote that this album was a "mastery of Moctar's craft" as a guitarist, as this album "makes use of brilliant and dense fingerpicking as well as the power chords favoured in hard rock". Reef Younis of Loud and Quiet scored this album a 7 out of 10, summing up his review "few have stories as compelling as Mdou Moctar but, as ‘Ilana (The Creator)’ testifies, he also has the Saharan sounds to back it up". NPR's Bob Boilen called this "the most insane psychedelic guitar album of the 21st century" and recommended that listeners come at it "with the volume cranked". Editors at Pitchfork scored this release an 8 out of 10, and critic Andy Beta praised this release as "an incandescent set of guitar music with a spontaneous, celebratory air—and a latent urgency reflecting the region’s very real difficulties". At PopMatters, Adriane Pontecorvo rated this album a 9 out of 10, writing that the album builds on the desert blues tradition and yet "still sounds fresh and different from anything Moctar’s contemporaries do". She also stated that "Moctar goes all in on energy, lets loose tidal waves of melody, and shreds on electric guitar as only he can."

== Track listing ==
All songs written by Mahamadou "Mdou Moctar" Souleymane.

1. "Kamane Tarhanin" – 5:08
2. "Asshet Akal" – 4:51
3. "Inizgam" – 1:24
4. "Anna" – 4:33
5. "Takamba" – 2:50
6. "Tarhatazed" – 7:27
7. "Wiwasharnine" – 3:38
8. "Ilana" – 4:46
9. "Tumastin" – 4:21

== Personnel ==
Mdou Moctar

- Mikey Coltun – bass guitar, recording, production
- Mazawadje Aboubacar Ibrahim – drums
- Ahmoudou Madassane – rhythm guitar, backing vocals
- Mdou Moctar – lead guitar, vocals

Additional personnel

- Robert Beatty – artwork
- Aroudaini Daniel – djembe
- Heba Kadry – audio mastering
- Christopher Kirkley – production
- Chris Koltay – recording
- Rigo Luis – photography
- Seth Manchester – mixing
- Cem Mısırlıoğlu – drum programming
- Anna Viotti – photography

== See also ==
- 2019 in rock music
- List of 2019 albums
