= Abdallah Oumbadougou =

Nigerien guitarist (c. 1962–2020)

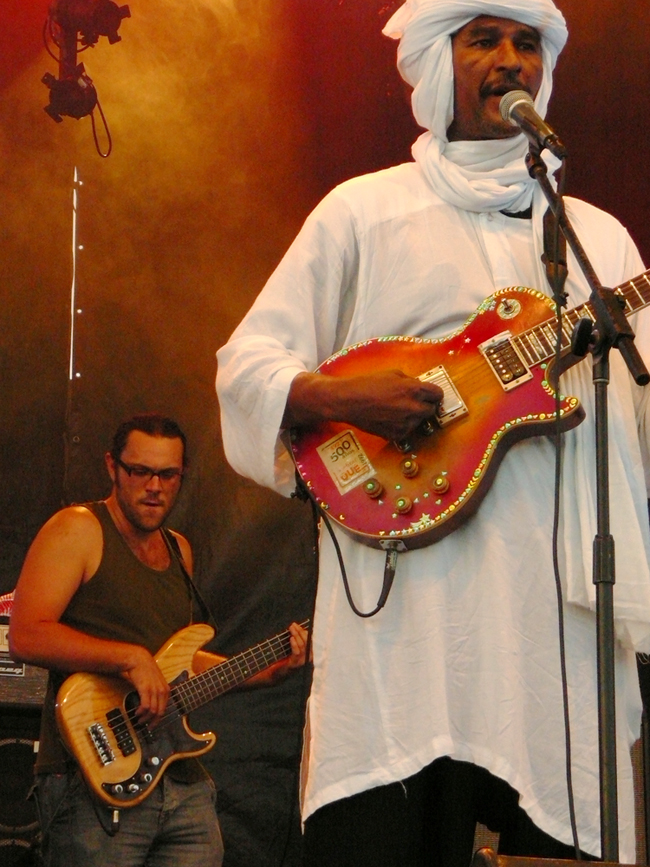
Abdallah Oumbadougou with Desert Rebel, 2008

Abdallah Oumbadougou (c. 1962 – 4 January 2020) was a Tuareg guitarist from Niger. He was one of the founders of the ishumar genre of the desert blues, a politicized, guitar-driven musical genre of the Kel Tamasheq people of North Africa's Sahel.

== Biography ==
Abdallah Oumbadougou was born c. 1962, in the village of Tchimoumounème near In-Gall, in the Agadez Region of Niger. He bought a guitar when he was 16 and taught himself how to play, and wrote songs influenced by the history of his people. After a famine in 1984 and amid growing repression of the Kel Tamasheq by the government, he went into exile in Algeria and Libya. Thus he participated in the movement that had given rise to the ishumar, the rebellious and illegal music made by nomads and exiles, whose highly politicized music sought to achieve unity in order to promote development and progress, and who promoted a "glorification of a cultural identity". He formed a group, Tagueyt Takrist Nakal (also "Takrist'n' Akal", meaning "building the country"), and between 1991 and 1995 recorded a number of songs which circulated throughout the region illegally on cassette. After the Tuareg rebellion (1990–1995) ended he was allowed back into Niger, and more than 2000 people attended a homecoming concert in Niamey where Takrist'n' Akal played in front of government officials to celebrate the peace accord that ended the uprising.

Oumbadougou is regarded as the "godfather of all the present-day Tuareg musicians in Niger"; many of them played with him before going on to have touring careers in the United States and Europe. One of the musicians who played with him was guitarist and songwriter Koudede, who died in a car crash in 2012. He is cited as an important influence by musicians including Mdou Moctar, who built his own guitar after listening to Oumbadougou and others. He also participated on others' records, including the 2012 album Folila by the Malinese duo Amadou & Mariam.

His album Anou Malane, produced in Benin and released on cassette in 1994/1995, was re-released by Sahel Sounds in 2019. He died in hospital in Agadez, on 4 January 2020.

== Discography ==
- 1995: Anou Malane
- 2002: Imawalen
- 2004: Afrikya
- 2005: Desert Rebel
- 2012: Zozodinga
