= Sogha =

Groupe Sogha
- Origin: Niger
- Genre: African Music/ Hausa music / Zarma-Songhai Music / Desert blues
- Years active: 2004–present
- Members: Aïchatou Ali Soumaïla, Fati Hallidou, Rahmatou Hassane, Nana Mallam Garba, Abdou Seydou, Issaka Maazou, Ousseini Tari, Tahirou Hima

Sogha (or Sogha Niger) is a Nigerien neo-traditional music group that combines traditional and modern instruments in its music. The word Sogha means “beauty” in the Zarma-Songhay language. The group is composed of ten members, five instrumentalists, three singers, and two dancers.

Groupe Sogha was Niger's music ambassador at the 2005 Francophone Games in Niamey. The group became an instant success after producing the hymn for the 2005 Francophonie games 'Na Am Fracophonie'(Yes Francophonie). Other major hits include 'Dan Kwali' and 'Fulbe'. Sogha has produced two albums, recorded under the artistic direction of the music maestro Boncana Maiga. In 2018, the Executive Committee of the African Music Council, headquartered in Brazzaville, Congo, decided to admit the Nigerien Groupe Sogha as a member of the Council under the category of National and Specialized Organizations. Sogha is a profusion of talents and an illustration of a country that wishes to promote the expression of women in its very traditionalist and conservative society.

== Appearances ==
The group has performed in several festivals since its formation, Festival Wedbinde in Burkina Faso, FESPACO, atypical nights of Koudougou in Burkina Faso, Festival MASA in Ivory Coast, “TIMBUCTU” au Canada, the ZARAGOZA fair in Spain among others.
