= Amanar (disambiguation) =

Amanar may refer to:

== People and characters ==
- Simona Amânar (born 1979), Romanian gymnast
- Amanar Abdillah, an Indonesian soccer player; see 2017 Indonesia national football team results
- Tavian Amanar, a fictional character from the 2017 film The Crucifixion (film)
- Amanar, a fictional character, a Merwyrm from the Warhammer videogame Total War: Warhammer II

== Other uses ==
- Amanar (vault), a gymnastics vault maneuver named after Romanian gymnast Simona Amanar, a Yurchenko-type vault
- Amanar (band), a Malian Taureg band
