= Music from Saharan WhatsApp =

Compilation album by various artists
- Released: June 10, 2022
- Genres: North African music; Mande music; desert blues; Tuareg music; minimal synth; Nigerién techno; Mandinka music; wedding music
- Languages: Akan, Cebuano, Chewa, Hindi, Portuguese, Swahili
- Label: Sahel Sounds
- Producer: Sahel Sounds

Music from Saharan WhatsApp is a compilation album released on June 10, 2022, by American record label Sahel Sounds. It consists of various songs performed by different musical artists from the northern and Sahelian regions of Africa.

== Track listing ==
No.	Title	Artist	Length
1.	"Tarha Ebouse Dighe Mane"	Etran de L'Air	6:27
2.	"Wara"	Oumou Diabate and Kara Show	4:58
3.	"Elyn"	Jeich Ould Badu	3:06
4.	"Adouna"	Alkibar Jr	3:50
5.	"Tarhanine"	Amaria Hamadalher	3:06
6.	"Ne Be Massa Wofo"	Luka Productions and Kandiafa	4:21
7.	"Hey Malale"	Andal Sukabe	2:07
8.	"Alhoria"	Hama	3:46
9.	"Saghmi Yessri"	Veyrouz Mint Seymali	4:02
10.	"Takamba"	Bounaly	4:39
11.	"Fatima"	Oyiwane	4:20
