= Fati Niger =

Nigerien singer

- Also known as: Gimbiyar Mawakan Hausa
- Born: Fati Binta Mohammed Labaran
- Origin: Maradi, Niger
- Genres: Hausa music
- Occupations: Singer, actress
- Years active: 2004 – present

Binta Labaran (professionally known as Fati Niger) is a Nigerian singer and actress who has earned the title "Gimbiyar Mawakan Hausa" (translated to "Princess of Hausa music"). She was born and brought up in Maradi, Niger where she had her Quranic education before moving to Nigeria to pursue her singing career. Fati Niger has produced 4 albums with over 500 songs to her credit. She is from the Hausa ethnic group.

== Early life and career ==
Fati Niger was born and bought up in Maradi, Niger. Growing up, she has always had a passion for singing especially traditional Hausa songs which are mostly sung during a full moon night among the youngsters in Hausa Villages.

After visiting her sister in 2004 in Nigeria, she discovered a thriving music industry in the city of Kano. There, she sought her sister's advice and consent before recording her first song at the studio of Ali Baba in the city of Kano.

== Discography ==
Fati has produced 4 albums and over 500 songs. She has also appeared in various Hausa Kannywood movies.

=== Songs ===
Fati is famous for many movie, political and party songs. Her song 'Girma-Girma',(in English; God is greater -God is greater) raised her status where she became famous and known around the world.
