= Funeral for Justice =

Studio album by Mdou Moctar
- Released: 3 May 2024
- Recorded: Mid-2023, prior to June
- Studio: A home studio in New York, US
- Genre: Desert blues; psychedelic rock
- Length: 39:04
- Language: Berber (Tamasheq), English
- Label: Matador
- Producer: Mikey Coltun

Mdou Moctar chronology
Afrique Victime (2021)	Funeral for Justice (2024)

"This album is really different for me. Now the problems of terrorist violence are more serious in Africa. When the US and Europe came here, they said they're going to help us, but what we see is really different. They never help us to find a solution."

—Mdou Moctar, vocalist of the band of the same name, on the political themes and context for recording Funeral for Justice

Funeral for Justice is the 2024 studio album by Nigerien desert blues band Mdou Moctar, released on Matador Records. It has received positive reviews from critics and was supported by a concert tour. The album explores cultural and political themes, including the impact of foreign interference in Nigerien affairs and the replacement of indigenous languages with colonial ones. It was recorded in "a largely empty home in upstate New York, during sessions that would begin late at night and run all through the next day."

== Reception ==
Professional ratings
Aggregate scores
Source	Rating
AnyDecentMusic?	8.2/10
Metacritic	90/100
Review scores
Source	Rating
AllMusic	4.5/5 stars
Classic Rock	8/10
Exclaim!	8/10
The Line of Best Fit	9/10
MusicOMH	5/5 stars
NME	4/5 stars
The Observer	5/5 stars
Pitchfork	8.4/10
PopMatters	10/10
Uncut	4/5 stars

Editors at AnyDecentMusic? scored this release 8.2 out of 10, aggregating 17 reviews. According to the review aggregator Metacritic, Funeral for Justice received "universal acclaim" based on a weighted average score of 90 out of 100 from 17 critic scores. It is the fourth highest rated album of 2024 on Metacritic.

ABC News' Dan Condon called this release "scintillating", with lyrics that inform the listeners about the suffering of others. Editors at AllMusic rated this album 4.5 out of 5 stars, with critic Tiothy Monger writing that "this is a band and artist working at their peak, and Funeral for Justice is a career highlight". Writing at The Arts Desk, Guy Oddy scored this release 4 out of 5 stars, calling it "the real deal and, at a time when most Western musicians seem to be afraid or uninterested in calling out those who are driving us all to disaster" and "louder, faster and more overtly political than any of his band's previous discs". Bill Pearis of BrooklynVegan included this among the best releases of the week, calling this the band's "most overtly political album yet... with music that is invigorating, stirring and has revolution on its mind". In Exclaim!, Matthew Teklemariam rated Funeral for Justice an 8 out of 10, writing that "the music here is so energetic that it's invigorating" and "the production is a tight fit" that results in "a minor epic built from a surfeit of dissident spirit and Van Halen fanaticism". Shawn Donohue of Glide Magazine praised the musicianship on display: "while Moctar's fire-breathing guitar playing will grab the headlines, it is the drumming that truly adds an extra punch throughout the album" and "Funeral for Justice finds the band flying high while creating songs they believe passionately in, resulting in the strongest album of Mdou Moctar's career". A profile of the band at Guitar.com by Huw Baines called this their "most free and experimental album yet" and praised the guitar-playing by band leader Moctar as well as bassist Mikey Coltun's "meticulous production". Janelle Borg of Guitar World stated that this music shows a progression in Moctar's songwriting and likened the playing style to Jimi Hendrix and Eddie Van Halen.

Noah Barker of The Line of Best Fit rated Funeral for Justice a 9 out of 10, telling readers "if you've heard a previous Moctar record and pieced together the best bits, you'll have an imitation of Funeral for Justice's righteous glory, but if you haven't, use this record as a roadmap in discovering the previous odd-decade of Moctar's talent". Writing for MusicOMH, Ross Horton scored this work a 5 out of 5, declaring it "a fantastic album [which] may be the best of an already-excellent run of albums produced by... the greatest rock band in the world". A profile of the band in NME by Oumar Selah stated that this release shows that the band "remain musically inventive and passionate for change in their home nation and beyond". That magazine also published a review by Max Pilley who scored it 4 out of 5 stars, stating that listeners to this "wildly exciting" music "will not just hear the glorious music of the Tuareg people, but they will understand their struggles, too". In The New York Times, Ben Sisario called this release "a cri de coeur of screaming guitars and lyrics decrying the legacy of colonialism in Niger and throughout Africa" that "amps up the urgency" of 2021's Afrique Victime. In The Observer, Phil Mongredien rated Funeral for Justice 5 out of 5 stars, stating that it "doesn't pull any punches, whether tackling the disastrous legacy of French colonialism... and the failures of African leaders to build up their countries..., or the way that Moctar's native Tamasheq language is at risk of dying out as it loses out to French among younger people...".

In a feature on this album in Paste, Grant Sharples called it "punctuated by boisterous cymbal crashes and Moctar's signature shredding, it's an undeniable rallying cry" and "a celebration of Tuareg culture and, simultaneously, a denunciation of France's exploitation and profit from Niger's uranium reserves". Editors at Pitchfork scored this release 8.4 out of 10, declaring it among the Best New Music and critic Arielle Gordon praised the incendiary political lyrics: "it's impossible to miss—from the blood dripping off of the crows on its album cover to the screeching guitars that open its first song, it's the proud sound of rebellion, transposed from Tamasheq into a language that refuses to be misinterpreted". At PopMatters, Adriane Pontecorvo rated this album a 10 out of 10, writing that "Even by Mdou Moctar's high standards, Funeral for Justice is extraordinary. It is searing in music and lyrics, with messages that are essential in a world on fire and whose sounds can carry those messages far and wide. More than any previous Mdou Moctar album, it feels alive: Moctar and his whole band are in the room with their listeners, fanning the flames of righteous resolve and reminding us that if justice is dead, there's no more fitting tribute to it than raising our voices on its behalf". Jon Dolan of Rolling Stone called this "the band's most forceful album yet, tailor-made to melt minds at massive festivals" with "anti-colonial and anti-corruption declarations" accompanied by Moctar's guitar work.

In Spill Magazine, Chris Patterson rated this album a 9.0 out of 10 and ended his review: "Mdou Moctar delivers another blazing and quite intoxicating album on Funeral For Justice". Spin's Ana Leorne gave this album an A, stating that it "represents another step in decentralizing the public discourse from Western normative standards, hopefully allowing for a better understanding of others and ourselves". Editors at Stereogum chose this for Album of the Week, with critic Chris DeVille calling it "a fantastic record that should not have to exist", due to its response to the 2023 Nigerien coup, but continues that it is "too energized to be depressing", with "shout-along slogans to go along with the rumbling rhythms and guitar heroism". In Uncut, Daniel Dylan Wray rated Funeral for Justice 4 out of 5 stars, calling the music "emphatic psych-rock". Kyle Kersey of Under the Radar gave Funeral for Justice a 9 out of 10, emphasizing the band's evolution and called this "a tighter record that's infused with garage rock energy" than Afrique Victime.

In a May 31 roundup of the best albums of the year thus far, editors at Exclaim! ranked the album at #8, calling it "a resolute rush of North African rock pack with AOR ambition". The staff at Consequence of Sound included it among the best albums of May, with Sun Noor writing that it "amplifies the generational struggle for liberation"; on June 4, the site published a list of the best albums of the year so far, ranking Funeral for Justice at #6, with Noor stating that it "transmits a message of hope, a rarity during these turbulent times". A June 3 overview of the best albums of the year in Spin included Blu Wave where Jonathan Cohen stated "there's something at once ancient, sacred and ultra-modern going on here, and it's a welcome psych-rock rallying cry against the imperialistic assholes with whom we can never seem to dispense".

=== Year-end lists ===
Select year-end rankings for Funeral for Justice
Publication/critic	Accolade	Rank	Ref.
Exclaim!	50 Best Albums of 2024	18	
MOJO	The Best Albums Of 2024	22	
Uncut	80 Best Albums of 2024	14	

== Track listing ==
All lyrics are written by Mahamadou Souleymane; all music is composed by Souleymane, Michael Coltun, and Ahmoudou Madassane.

1. "Funeral for Justice" – 3:09
2. "Imouhar" – 5:07
3. "Takoba" – 3:54
4. "Sousoume Tamacheq" – 5:41
5. "Imajighen" – 4:11
6. "Tchinta" – 5:13
7. "Djallo #1" – 0:24
8. "Oh France" – 5:40
9. "Modern Slaves" – 5:45

== Personnel ==
Mdou Moctar

- Mdou Moctar – lead guitar, vocals
- Mikey Coltun – bass guitar, guitar, percussion, backing vocals, production, engineering
- Souleymane Ibrahim – drums, djembe, backing vocals
- Ahmoudou Madassane – rhythm guitar, backing vocals

Technical

- Robert Beatty – artwork
- Heba Kadry – mastering
- Seth Manchester – mixing

== Charts ==
Funeral for Justice entered the following charts, peaking at the number specified for each: the Scottish Albums Chart (#26), UK Album Sales Chart (#24), UK Album Downloads Chart (#30), UK Physical Albums Chart (#28), UK Vinyl Albums Chart (#27), UK Record Store Chart (#17), UK Independent Albums Chart (#10), and UK Independent Album Breakers Chart (#5).

== See also ==
- 2024 in rock music
- List of 2024 albums
