= Mdou Moctar =

Nigerien musician (born 1984)

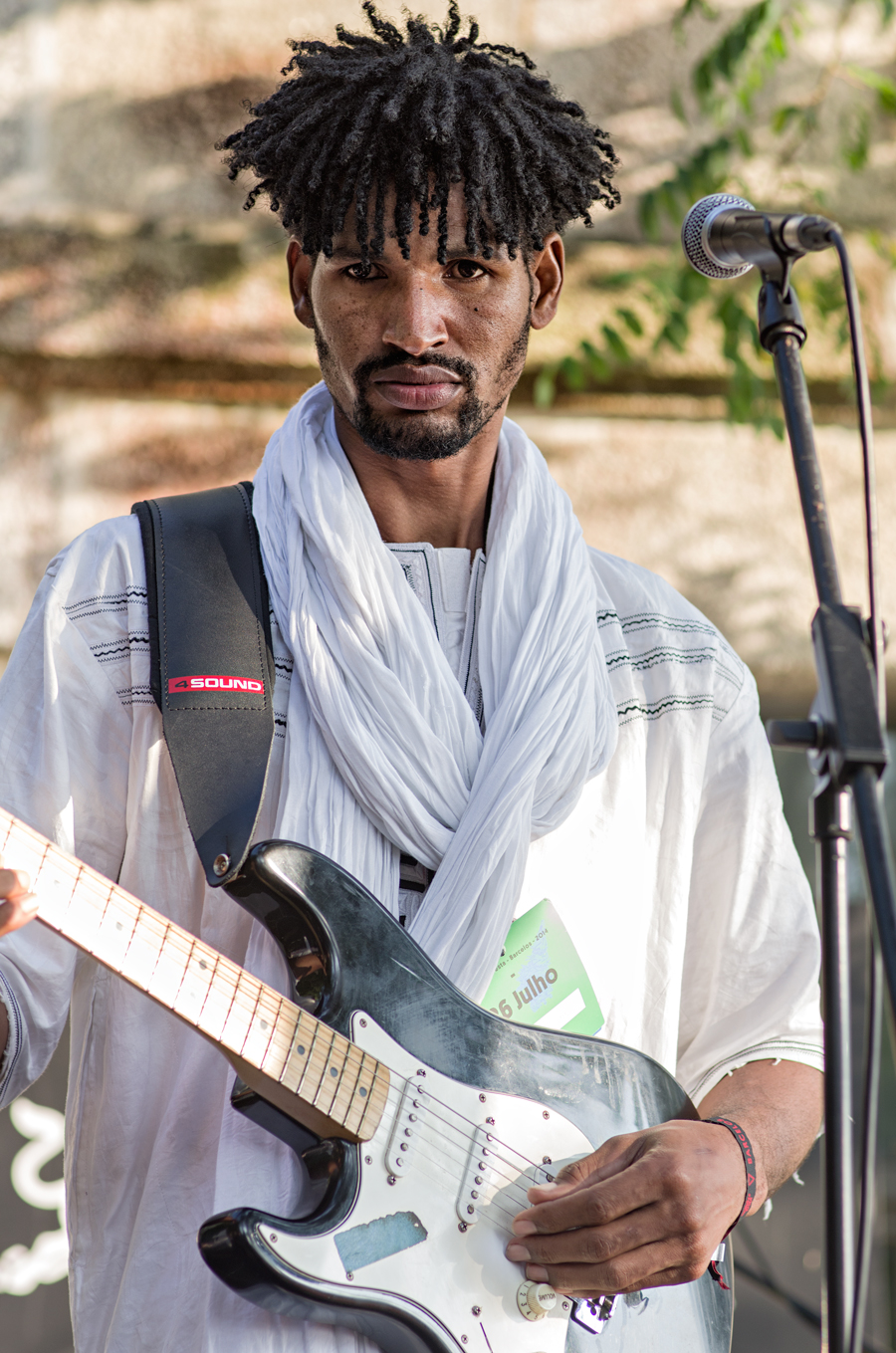
- Moctar performing in 2014

Background information
- Also known as: M.dou Mouktar
- Born: Mahamadou Souleymane; 1984 (age 41–42); Abalak, Niger
- Genres: Rock; blues; assouf
- Occupations: Musician; songwriter
- Instruments: Guitar; vocals
- Years active: 2008–present
- Labels: Sahel Sounds, Stone Tapes, Matador
- Website: mdoumoctar.com

Mahamadou Souleymane (born 1984), known professionally as Mdou Moctar (also M.dou Mouktar), is a Nigerien guitarist, singer and songwriter who performs modern rock music inspired by Tuareg guitar music. His music first gained attention through a trading network of mobile phones and memory cards in West Africa.

Souleymane sings in the Tamasheq language. Moctar's fourth album, Ilana: The Creator, released in 2019, was the first to feature a full band. He plays guitar in the takamba and assouf styles. Souleymane also appeared in the 2015 film Akounak Tedalat Taha Tazoughai (Rain the Color of Blue with a Little Red in It). His first album, Anar (2008), featured autotuned vocals and was not officially released, but became popular across the Sahel through mobile phone music trading.

== Early life ==
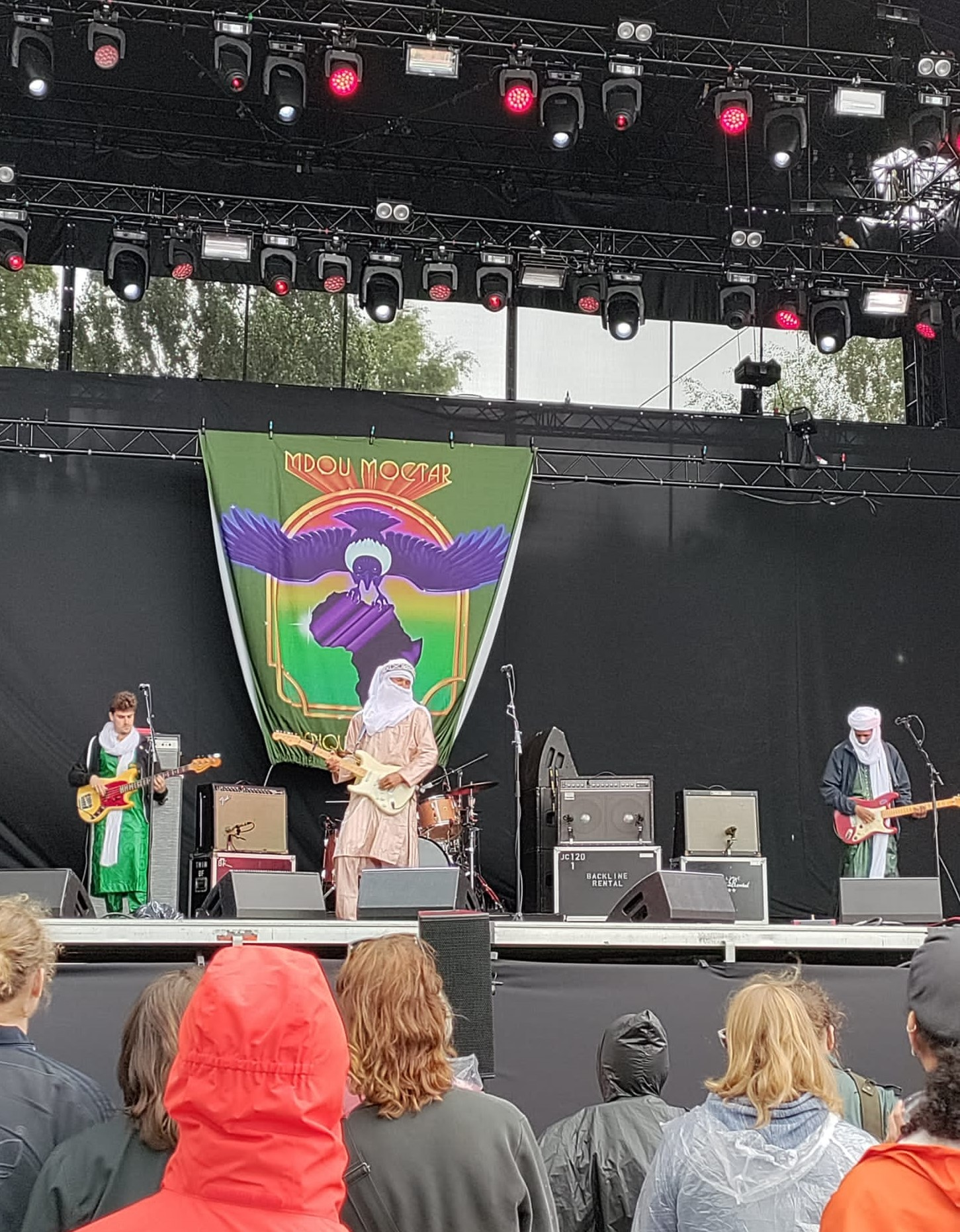
Moctar at the 2022 Pori Jazz festival in Pori, Finland

Mdou Moctar was born in Abalak, Niger. He grew up in the village of Tchintabaraden, then in Arlit, a mining town. After listening to artists such as Abdallah Oumbadougou, he wanted to play the guitar, but his family disapproved of electric music for religious reasons, so he had to build his own guitar using bicycle cables for strings. He is a practicing Muslim who observes Ramadan.

== Career ==
=== Early career (2008–2013) ===
His first album, Anar, was recorded in Sokoto, Nigeria, in 2008 and prominently featured autotuned vocals and influences from Hausa music. The album was not officially released at the time but the songs became popular across the Sahel when they went viral through mobile phone music trading networks. Many of Moctar's initial songs were shared as MP3 files person-to-person throughout Niger via Bluetooth without his involvement.

Some of the songs reached a global audience when Sahel Sounds released them on the Music from Saharan Cellphones: Volume 1 compilation. Two songs were covered with English homophone lyrics by Brainstorm, an American band from Portland, Oregon. Anar was released on vinyl in 2014 with a high price, due to "predatory business practices" from Sixt on Moctar's first European tour.

=== Sahel Sounds (2013–2019) ===
His next album, Afelan, was recorded live in Tchintabaraden and features "rusty-edged jams and sun-weathered ballads". The title track is named after a celebrated historical/folkloric hero of the Azawough of Western Niger. It contains a cover of "Chet Boghassa" by Tinariwen. Moctar became aware of international interest in his music in 2014:

"I first met [Christopher Kirkley of Sahel Sounds] on the mobile phone as he had called me ... It was a weird conversation, as I thought my cousin was pulling a joke on me so I hung up. This American guy calling me, saying he wanted to work with me for my music, it just couldn’t be real. He called me again and we talked. He came to visit me in my village and also sent me a lefthanded guitar, which is very hard to find in Niger. This guitar has crossed several African countries to arrive in my hands, I have been playing it ever since!"

=== Matador (2019–present) ===
After Gerard Cosloy, the co-founder of Matador, showed interest in Moctar's music, Cosloy set up a few meetings, later signing Moctar to Matador. Moctar released his fifth studio album Ilana (The Creator) in 2019; it was his first studio album recorded with a full band. NPR's Bob Boilen named the album "perhaps the most fiery psych-rock of the 21st century" while Happy Mag placed it at no.13 on their list of "The 25 best psychedelic rock albums of the 2010s", labelling it "serious music for a serious cause." Moctar's sixth album, Afrique Victime, was released via Matador Records on 21 May 2021. The album received positive reviews from international publications including Rolling Stone, Paste, Pitchfork, and The Guardian. His seventh album, Funeral for Justice, was released on May 3, 2024, to positive reviews. On October 2, 2024, an acoustic rework of Funeral for Justice called Tears of Injustice was announced.

== Film career ==
Moctar appeared in the short film I Sing the Desert Electric in 2013. He also had the starring role in the 2015 film Akounak Tedalat Taha Tazoughai (Rain the Color of Blue with a Little Red In It). The soundtrack features music performed on set and at L'Embobineuse. In 2022, Moctar appeared in a Fender Sessions video and performed three songs from their album Afrique Victime, including the title track "Afrique Victime", "Ya Habibti" and "Chismiten". Moctar performed an NPR Tiny Desk (Home) Concert, recorded in the winter of 2020 from a home in Niamey, Niger and released on NPR's website on 24 May 2021. He performed a second time on NPR's Tiny Desk Concert in September 2024, this time in the NPR studios.

== Musical style ==
Ever since his debut, Moctar's music is based on rock, more specifically the Tuareg-produced Tishoumaren, a variation of desert blues. Moctar's first album, Anar, contained auto-tune and drum machines. Moctar's album Ilana: The Creator contained fierce guitar solos, while Afrique Victime, though significantly similar, was more politically charged. Moctar's album Funeral for Justice significantly expanded Moctar's range, with a more aggressive and "in your face" style.

== Band ==
=== Members ===
Adapted from album liner notes.

- Mahamadou "Mdou Moctar" Souleymane – lead guitar, vocals
- Ahmoudou Madassane – rhythm guitar, backing vocals
- Michael "Mikey" Coltun – bass guitar, backing vocals, drum machines; producer (2017–present)
- Souleymane Ibrahim – drums, percussion, backing vocals (2019–present)

Former members

- Aboubacar Mazawadje Ibrahim – drums (c. 2018)
- Mahmoud "Achcouscous" Ahmed Jabre – drums (c. 2016–2017)
Moctar's band performing in Sweden in 2019

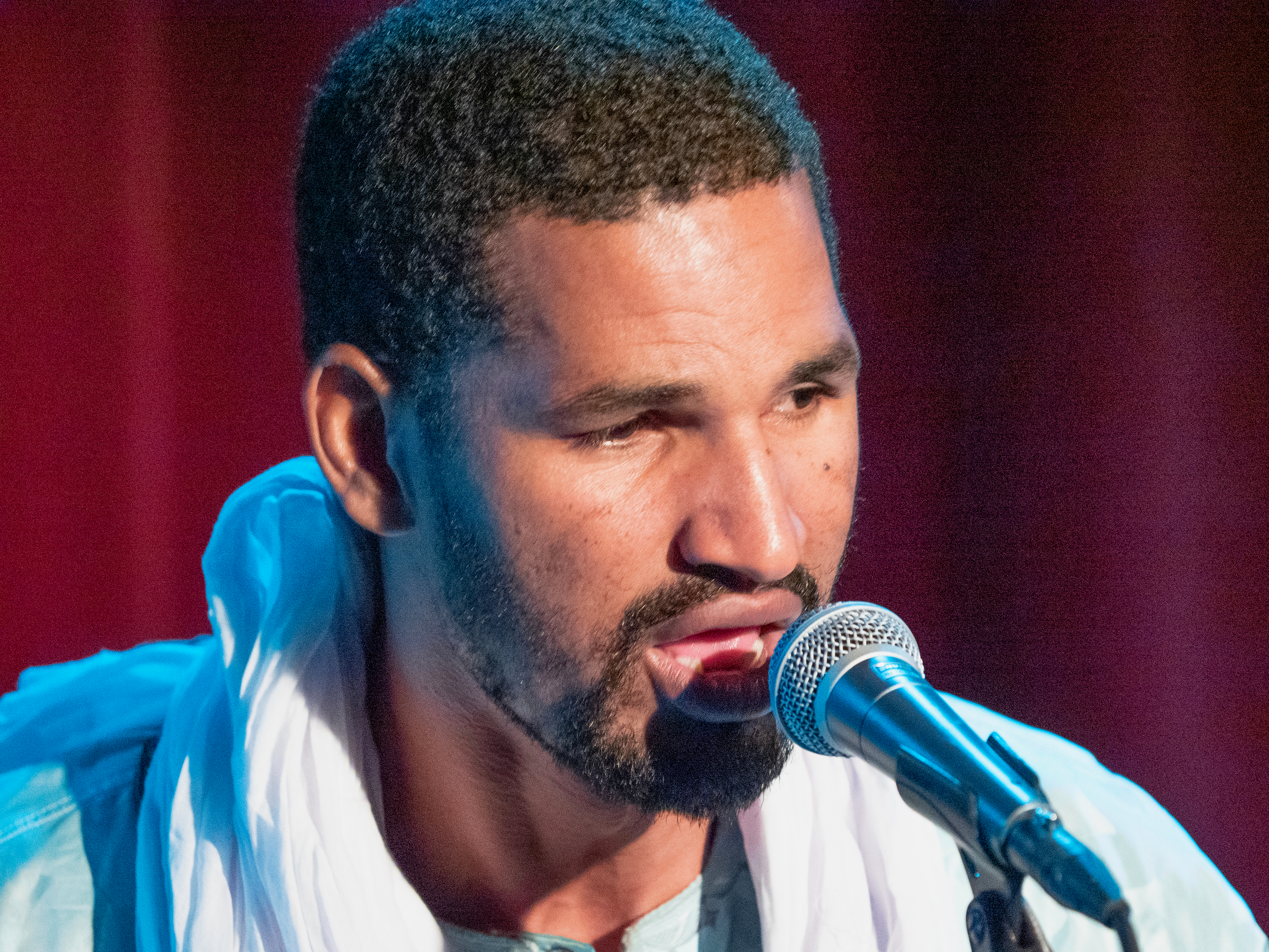
Mdou Moctar

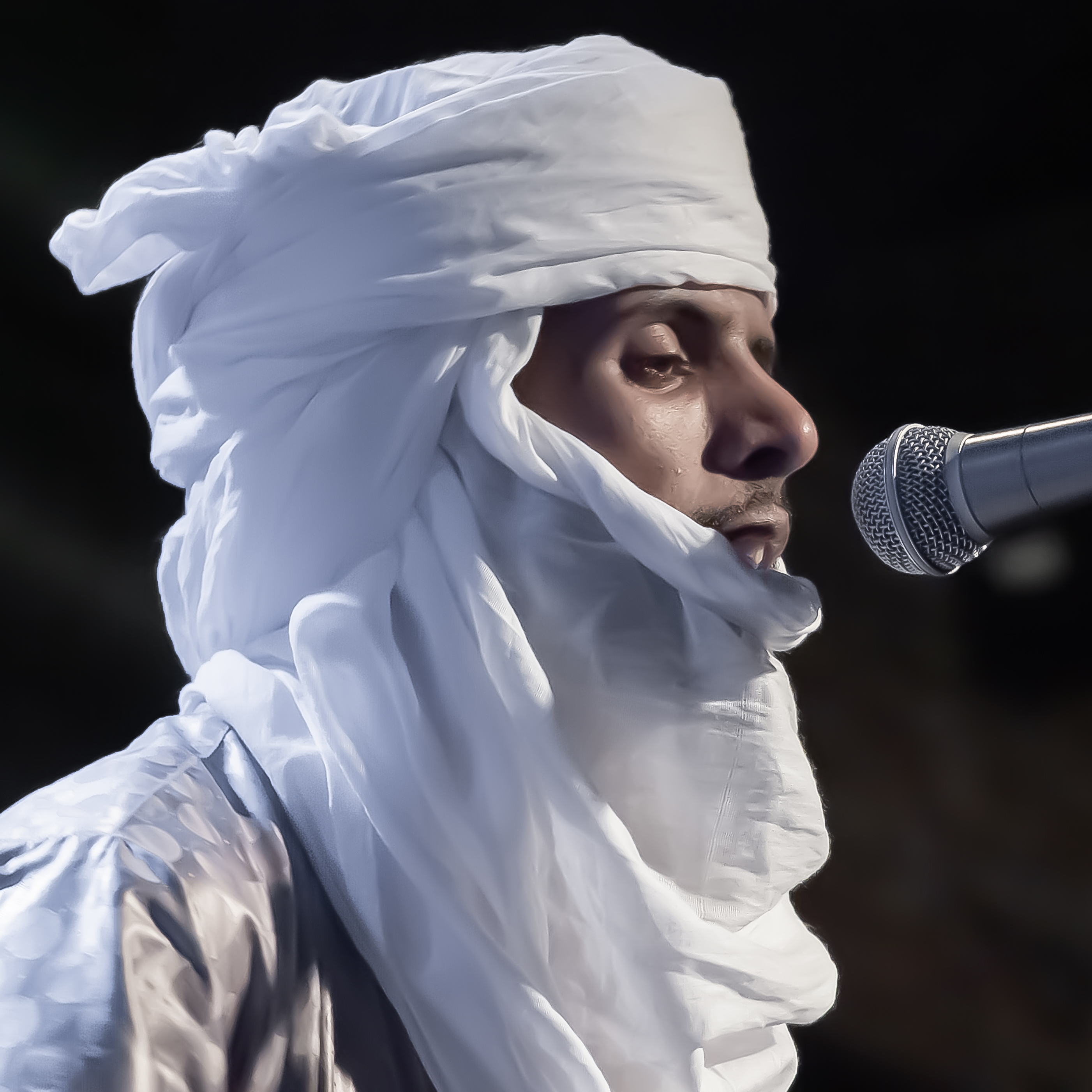
Ahmoudou Madassane

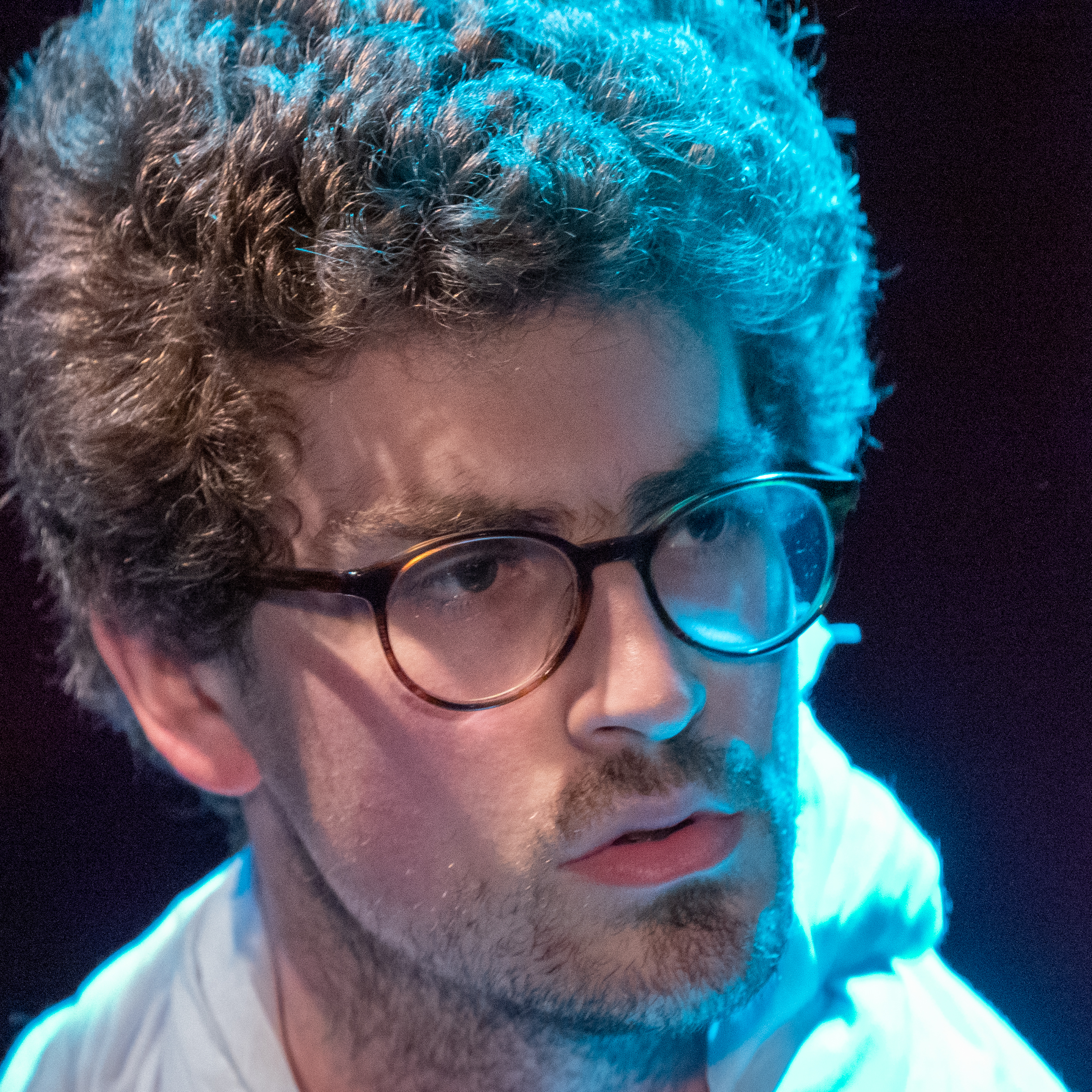
Michael Coltun

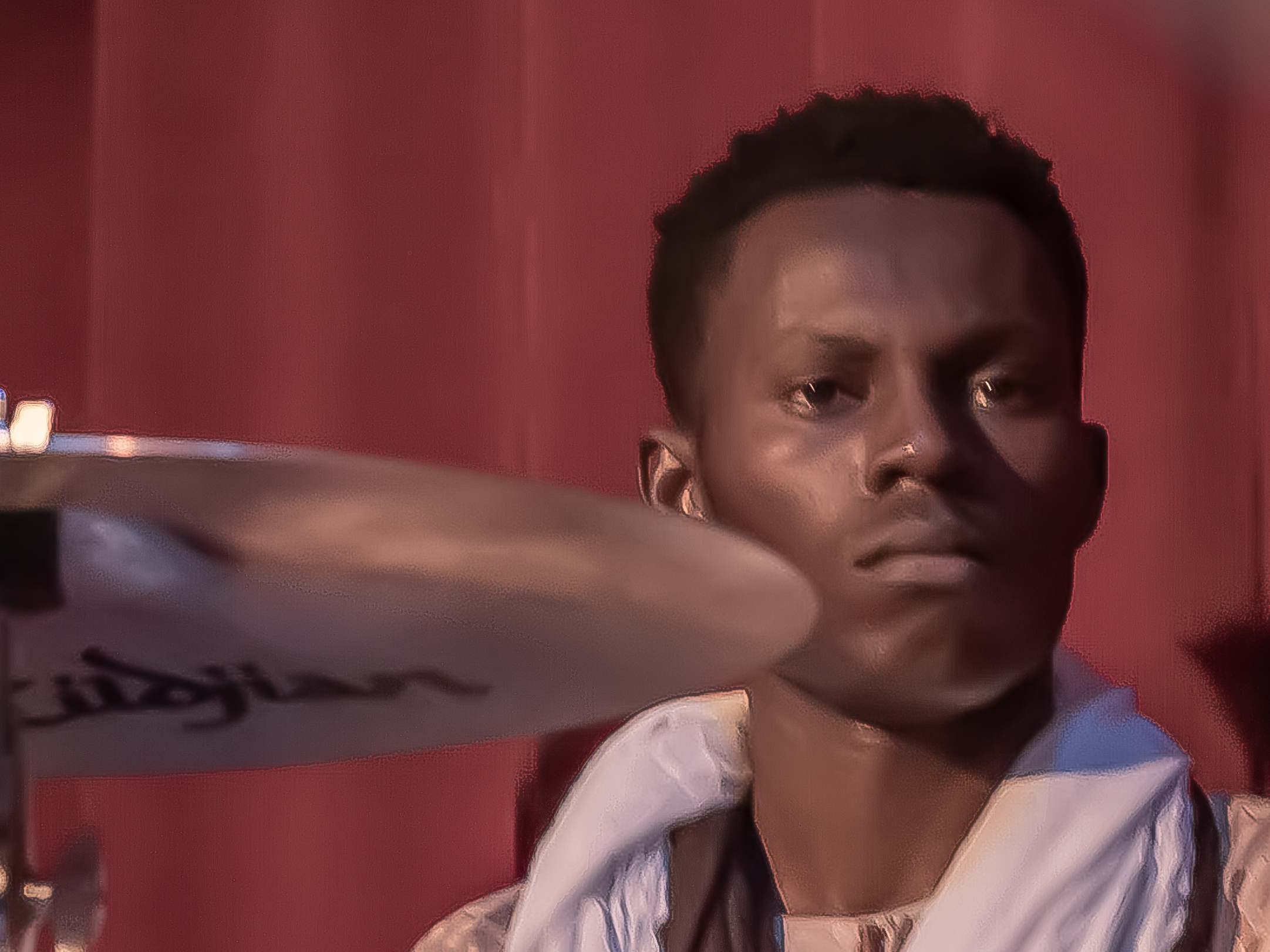
Souleymane Ibrahim

== Discography ==
=== Studio albums ===
- Anar (2008; reissued 2014 by Sahel Sounds)
- Akounak Tedalat Taha Tazoughai (original soundtrack) (Sahel Sounds, 2015)
- Sousoume Tamachek (Sahel Sounds, 2017)
- Ilana: The Creator (Sahel Sounds, 2019)
- Afrique Victime (Matador Records, 2021)
- Funeral for Justice (Matador, 2024)
- Tears of Injustice (Matador, 2025)

=== Live albums ===
- Afelan (Sahel Sounds, 2013)
- Blue Stage Sessions (Third Man Records, 2019)

=== Singles and EPs ===
- Tahoultine (2011)
- Anar / Vanessa (Sahel Sounds, 2012) (split with Brainstorm)
- Ibitlan / Tiknass (Sunbone) (Sahel Sounds, 2020)
- Niger EP Vol. 1 (Matador, 2022)
- Niger EP Vol. 2 (Matador, 2022)

=== Remix Albums ===
- Afrique Refait (Matador, 2022)

=== Compilation appearances ===
- Music from Saharan Cellphones: Volume 1 (2010)
- Music for Saharan Cellphones: The International Reworks (2011)
- The Mdou Moctar Covers (2012) (split with Brainstorm)
- Pop Music from Republique Du Niger (2012)
- Music from Saharan Cellphones: Volume 2 (2013)
- Ronald Paris / Mdou Moctar (2014) (split cassette with Porches)
- Rough Trade Shops Africa 13 (2014)
- Mind the Gap #110 (2014)
- Below the Radar 10 (2014)
- Afrique Refait (2022) (remix album of Afrique Victime featuring only African artists)

== International tours ==
During February and March 2022, Mdou Moctar was touring with sixteen dates as the opening act for Brooklyn-based indie rock band Parquet Courts' North American Tour. Moctar also had eight headlining shows added to the beginning and end of this tour, which would be followed up by headlining a spring 2022 European tour.

In 2023, Moctar embarked an American tour that included performances at the Pitchfork Music Festival and the Newport Folk Festival. During the 2023 Nigerien coup d'état, Moctar and his band were unable to return to Niger and launched a GoFundMe campaign on August 3, 2023 for funding to remain in the United States indefinitely. By August 6, the band had raised $100,000, with musician Jack White among the donors.
