= Etran de L'Aïr =

Nigerien rock band

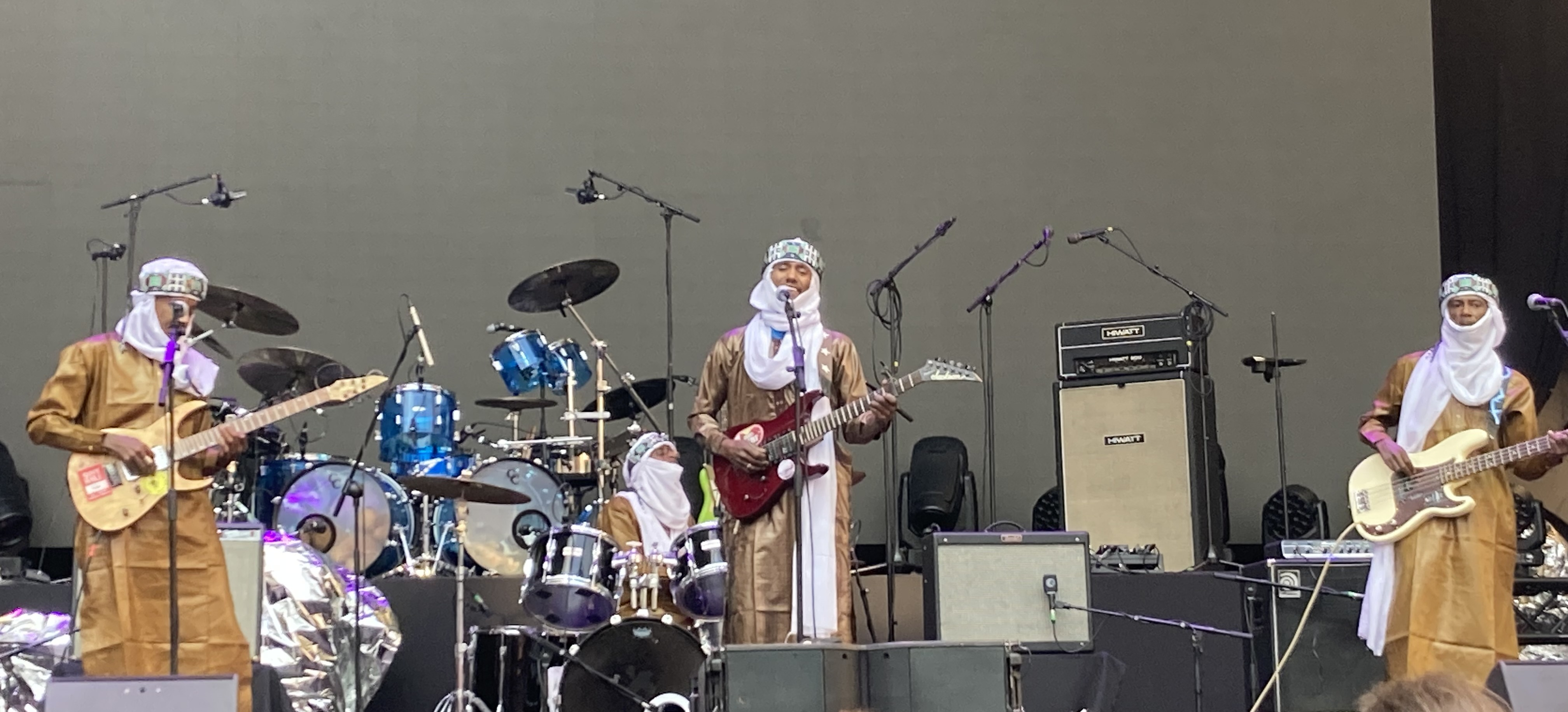
- Etran de L'Aïr performing at Poble Espanyol in 2025

Background information
- Origin: Agadez, Niger
- Years active: 1995–present
- Label: Sahel Sounds

Etran de L'Aïr ("stars of the Aïr") is a Nigerien rock band consisting of brothers and cousins, all born and raised in the small neighborhood of Abalane in Agadez, Niger. They were formed in 1995 and started off playing for local weddings before achieving international success.

The band is currently signed to Sahel Sounds and tours internationally. They have released three albums, No. 1 in 2018, Agadez in 2022, and 100% Sahara Guitar in 2024. The groups' first album, No. 1, was named the number one album of the year by Amanda Petrusich of The New Yorker. All albums by the band have received positive reviews.

The group generally has three guitarists, who swap instruments frequently through their concerts, all three being equally adept at bass and treble guitar. The amplified guitar-heavy style forms part of Tuareg Desert blues first popularized by Tinariwen in the 1970s and 1980s, combining elements of traditional Tuareg songs and Western blues and rock musical styles. They sing in Tamasheq.

== Discography ==
Studio albums

- No. 1 (2018, Sahel Sounds)
- Agadez (2022, Sahel Sounds)
- 100% Sahara Guitar (2024, Sahel Sounds)

=== Singles ===
- Toubouk Ine Chihoussay (2021, Sahel Sounds)
- Tchingolene (2022, Sahel Sounds)
