= Mali Blues (film) =

2016 documentary film

- Film poster
- Directed by: Lutz Gregor
- Starring: Fatoumata Diawara; Ahmed Ag Kaedy; Bassekou Kouyate; Master Soumy
- Release date: 2016
- Running time: 92 minutes
- Countries: Germany and Mali
- Language: French

Mali Blues is a 2016 documentary film directed by German filmmaker Lutz Gregor. The film documents the lives of four musicians in Mali's capital city, Bamako, following a music ban with the takeover of northern Mali by Islamist groups between 2012 and 2013. The film had its premiere at the 2016 Visions du Réel, the international documentary film festival in Switzerland. Malian musicians Fatoumata Diawara, Ahmed Ag Kaedy, Bassekou Kouyate, and Master Soumy feature.

The film had its premiere at the Visions du Reel in 2016, presented in the Bambara, Arabic, and French languages, with subtitles in English and French.

American film critic Frank Scheck, in The Hollywood Reporter, wrote that although Mali Blues was repetitive and sluggish in its pacing at times, it was nevertheless a "gorgeous paean to the liberating effects of music and the joy it can bring even to people faced with violent repression in the name of religion." Los Angeles Times critic Kenneth Turan found the most "compelling" scene to be the one in which Diawara returns to her childhood home, where she performs a song and speaks out against female genital mutilation.
