= Mamman Sani =

Nigerien-Ghanaian musician (born 1952)

Mamman Sani Abdoulaye is a Nigerien-Ghanaian musician. He first recorded his electronic organ music in 1978 but it remained largely obscure and undiscovered until 2013. He is considered to be an early pioneer of synth music in Niger. Sani found unlikely fame in Denmark, regularly appearing in the playlist of Copenhagen bars.

== Early life ==
In 1952, Mamman Sani was born in Accra to a privileged family. His father, of Nigerien descent, was the son of a World War I Colonel. Sani's mother was Ghanaian and the daughter of a chief. At the end of the 1950s his family moved to Niger, where his father became a librarian for the American Cultural Center, which gave him exposure to cultural materials from all over the world.

== Musical career ==
Sani began to play music in 1968. He was a fan of Otis Redding, James Brown, and Percy Sledge. After being an English teacher for some years, he got a job as a UNESCO functionary. In his role at UNESCO, Sani began to travel internationally. During a UNESCO meeting, Mamman purchased an Italian Orla electronic organ from a delegate from Rwanda.

His first professional experience as a musician was being hired by Niger's national television station to compose credits and interludes for their shows. At the time, Sani was still employed by UNESCO.

In 1978 he recorded his first album at Niger National Radio in two takes. It was released as a limited series of cassettes.

In 2013, Christopher Kirkley, an American musician and producer with a specialty in Sahelian music, discovered Mamman's recordings while searching through the musical archives of the Niamey museum. Kirkley described hearing Mamman's music: “It was esoteric and bizarre, unlike anything I had ever heard—the imaginary audio track to an arcade game of desert caravans trek through an pastoral landscape of 8-bit acacias and pixelized sand.” That year Kirkley released the recordings through his Portland-based record label Sahel Sounds, as "La Musique Electronique du Niger".
