= Mamar Kassey =

- Origin: Niamey, Niger
- Genres: Afro-jazz fusion.
- Years active: 1995–present

Mamar Kassey is a jazz-pop-ethnic band from Niger. It is named after Askia Muhammad I, a legendary warrior who extended the Songhai Empire into the Sahara.

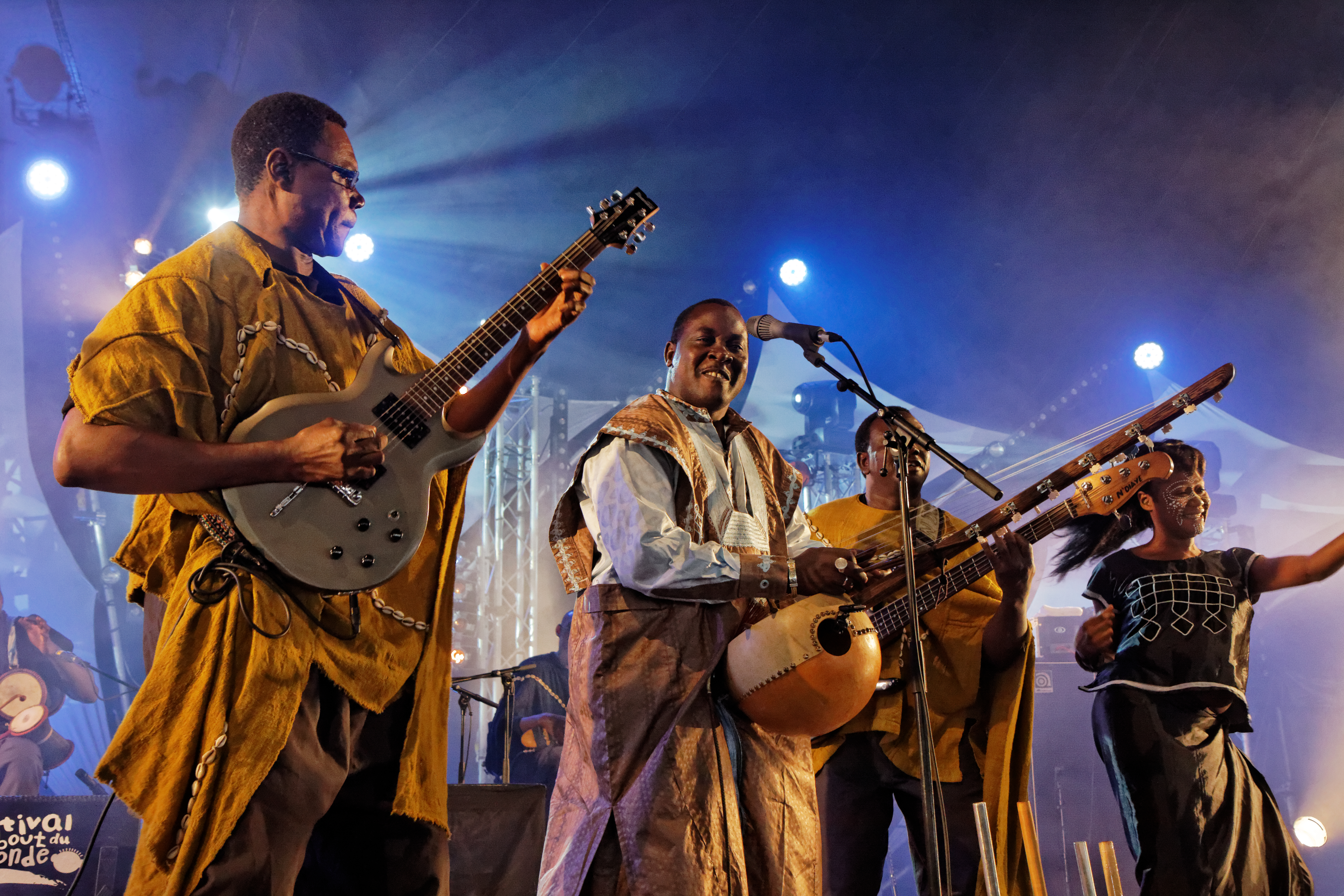
Mamar Kassey performing at Festival du Bout du Monde 2014, France

== Style ==
The band's leader is singer and flautist Yacouba Moumouni. The group combines traditional Zarma-Songhai, Hausa and Fula and rhythms, instruments such as the molo (a lute with a skin-covered body), and modern instruments such as the electric bass. Their sound also incorporates western jazz, Moroccan and Latin music.

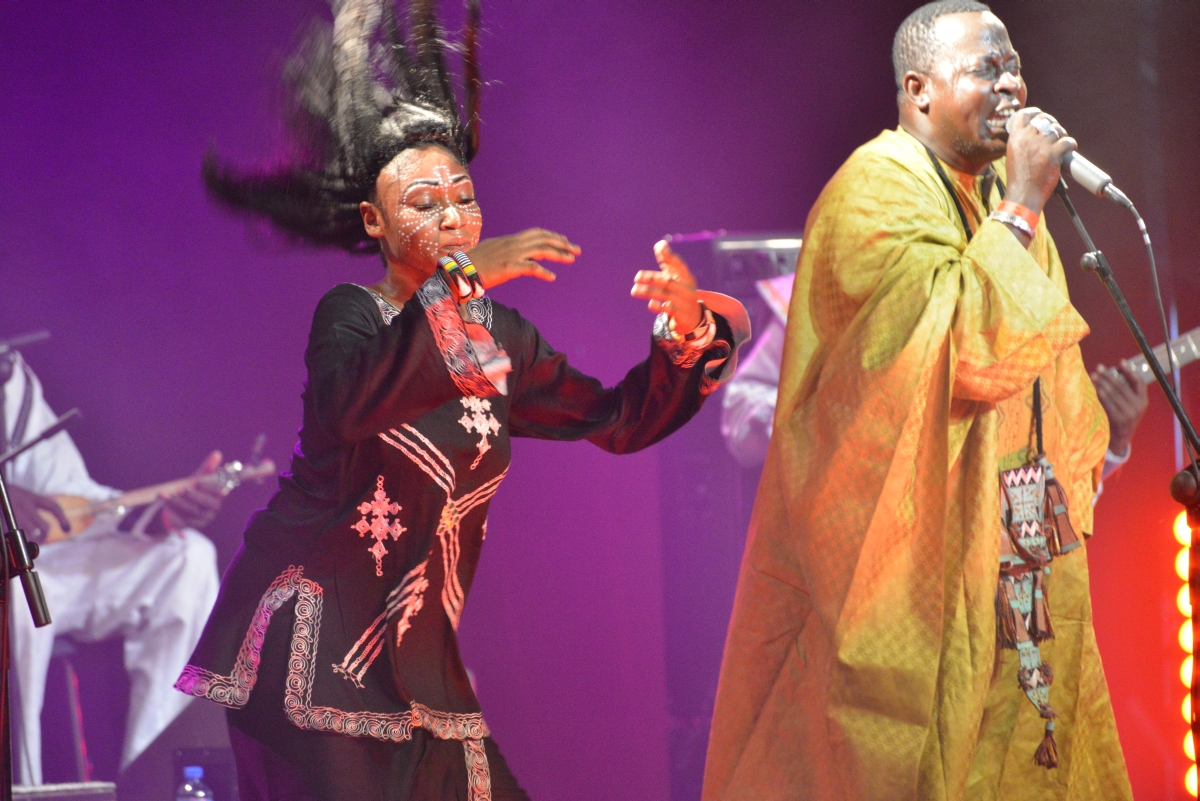
Mamam Kassey MusicMeeting 2014 The Netherlands

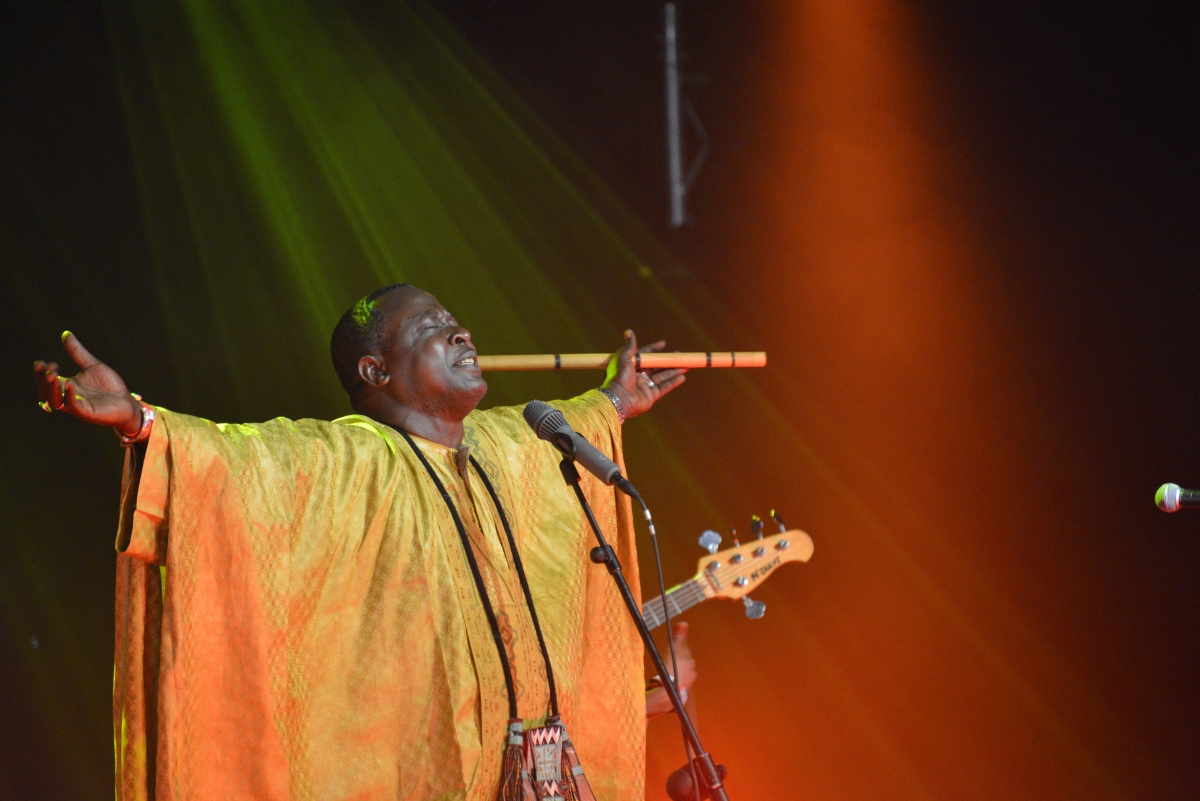
Mamar Kassey MusicMeeting 2014 in The Netherlands

== Musical career ==
An eight-piece group formed by Moumouni and guitarist Abdallah Alhassane in 1995, Mamar Kassey have released two albums internationally and toured Europe and the United States multiple times. They came to attention in France after an appearance at the Festival des Nuits Atypiques in Langon in 1998.

They are one of the few Nigerien musical acts to break out internationally, as well as at home.

=== Makida Palabre ===
In 2004–2005, musicians from Mamar Kassey toured with a group of Breton folk musicians under the name Makida Palabre. The collaboration included Breton musicians Pierre-Yves Prothais, Ronan Le Gourierec, Laurent Carré, and Youen Paranthoen playing Breton/Celtic, western jazz, and West African instruments.

== Musicians ==
The members of the band have changed over the course of the group's existence. The group that performed at the Festival des nomades in Benin in 2000 included:

- Abdoulaye ALASSANE, (ABDALLAH): guitar.
- Adamou DAOUDA, (NAGOULI): kalangou.
- Boubacar Souleyman MAIGA, (BARI): percussion, calabash.
- Harouna ABDOU : electric bass guitar.
- Housseïni Namata CHIBAKOU: molo lute.
- Yacouba MOUMOUNI: flute, vocals.

== Discography ==
- Denké-Denké, Daqui, Harmonia Mundi, (1999)
- Alatoumi, Daqui (2000), Harmonia Mundi (2001), World Village WV470003 (2001)
- Via Campesina, Daqui, Harmonia Mundi (2006)
- On va voir ça, Daqui, Harmonia Mundi (forthcoming, 2008)
- Niger, Innacor Records, (2013)
