= Ahmed Ag Kaedy =

Malian guitarist, singer and songwriter (born 1979)

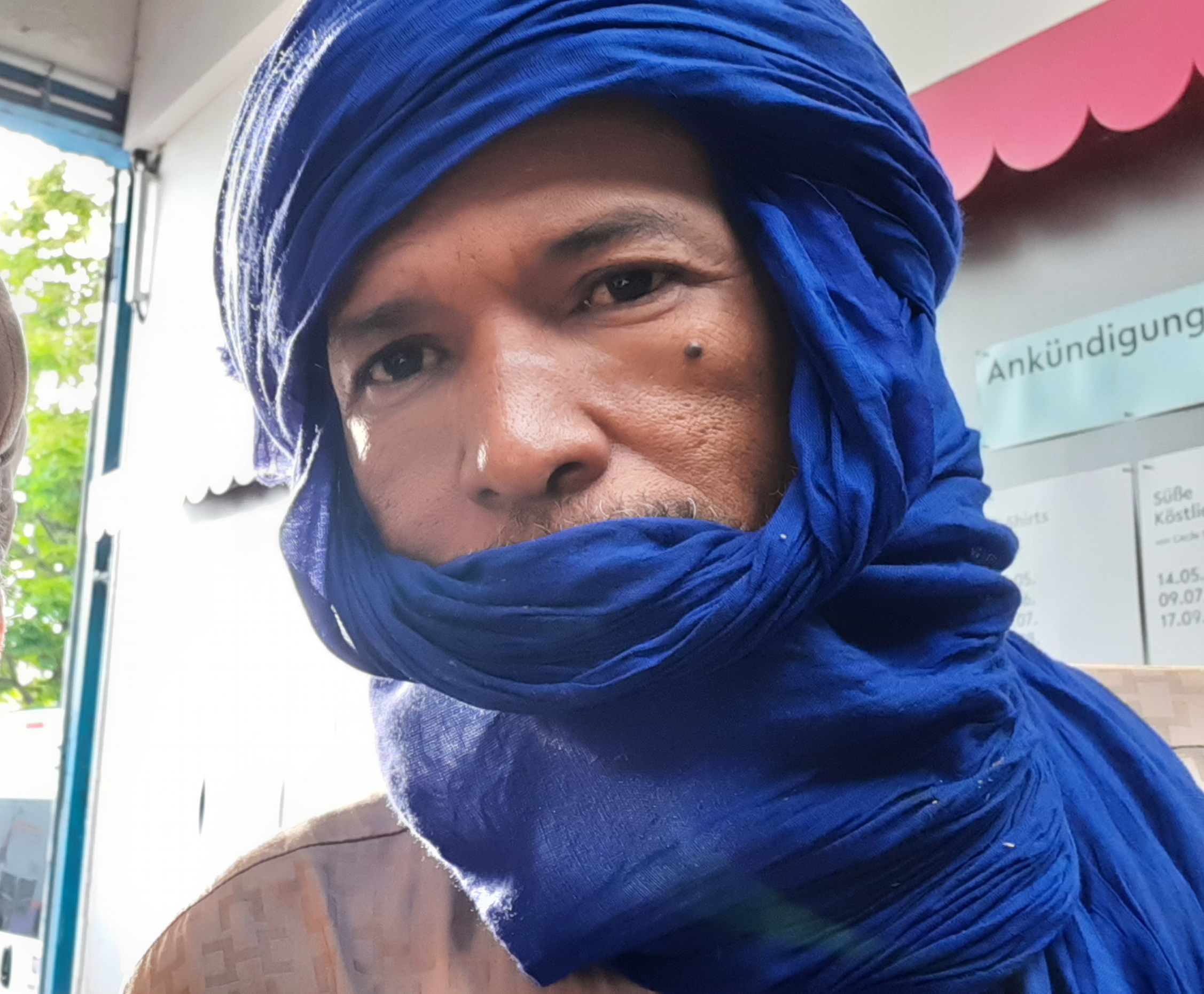
- Ahmed ag Kaedy in 2022

Background information
- Origin: Kidal, Mali
- Genre: Tuareg music
- Years active: 2007-present

Ahmed Ag Kaedy (born 1979) is a Malian guitarist, singer and songwriter. He is the leader of the group Amanar de Kidal. Originally from Kidal, he is a member of the nomadic Tuareg people, whose distinct style of rhythm and use of the guitar is often referred to as Tishoumaren, or desert blues. He is one of the main characters in the 2016 documentary Mali Blues.

== Biography ==
As a child, Ag Kaedy had no particular connection to playing music other than the rich musical tradition of his people. As a young man, like many of his peers, he enlisted in the military, taking up arms for the Libyan government then controlled by Muammar al-Qaddafi, who was one of the few offering a perspective for young Tuaregs eager for rebellion. It was in Libya where he first discovered the guitar. It quickly became clear to him that it was the guitar that represented his true calling, rather than the military.

Upon returning from Libya, he started his group Amanar in 2007. The band quickly gained fame in the region, playing local festivities and marriages. They won the prize for best new group at the Festival au Desert in 2010, which gave them the opportunity to travel to Europe and start gaining international notability. Ahmed Ag Kaedy and Amanar had regular appearances on Malian national TV.

In 2012 the Tuareg rebellion flared up, with strong Jihadist elements leading to, amongst other things, a prohibition of public performance of music. Under personal threats, Ag Kaedy could no longer work in his home, and was forced into exile, first to Niger and later to Bamako. These trials are also the subject of the Mali Blues documentary, which "examin[es] the threat of radical Islam to music in Mali".

He has since toured extensively throughout Africa, Europe and America, spreading his message of peace and advocating for the education of his people.

In 2018 he recorded his album Akaline Kidal in Portland, Oregon. The album, released by Sahel Sounds, was Bandcamp Album of the Day on March 8, 2019, and was also featured on NPR.

In 2022 he toured with Berlin-based jazz fusion combo Onom Agemo and the Disco Jumpers
