= Ibrahim Narambada =

Nigerian musician

Ibrahim Narambada (1890–1963), also known as Narambada Tubali, was a Hausa musician and singer active in the mid-20th century.

== Early life and influences ==
Born in Tubali village (present-day Sokoto State, Nigeria) around 1890, Narambada's mother was a musician. He initially played and sang Noma music, a rural folk tradition associated with his village. His first performance was of his village's music for the Sarkin Gobir of Isa.

== Musical style and achievements ==
Narambada became a singer specializing in Gobir music, a genre characterized by praise singing for rulers and prominent figures. However, his style blended Gobir with Noma music. His songs often touched on social issues, philosophical musings, and religious messages.

He received the patronage of Amadu Sarkin Gobir. His audience included Hausa communities in the region and beyond.

== Legacy and influence ==
Although details of his later life are scarce, Narambada recorded a number of songs, some of which remain popular today. His work has been the subject of academic research and conferences.

Narambada is remembered as a storyteller, weaving social commentary into his music. He blended inherited musical traditions with his own lyrics.
