= Yacouba Moumouni =

Nigerien musician

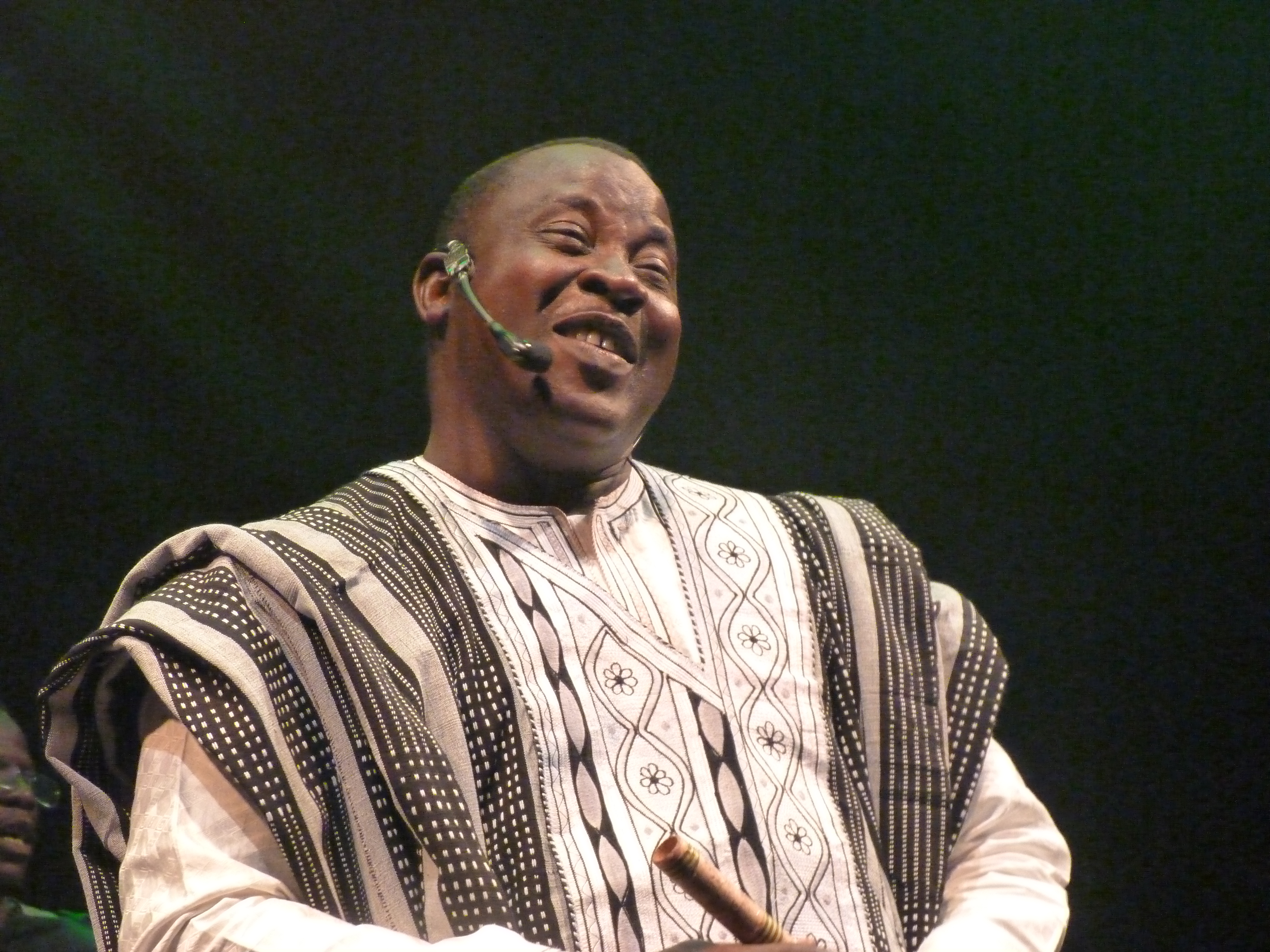
- Yacouba Moumouni at WOMEX 15, Budapest
- Born: 1966 (age 59–60); Téra
- Occupations: Singer; Flautist

Yacouba Moumouni is a Nigerien singer and flautist. As the leader of the jazz-ethnic band Mamar Kassey, he is one of the best-known Nigerien musicians outside Niger. He is from the Songhai ethnic group.

== Early life and career ==
Born in 1966 in a small sahel town some two hundred kilometres (125 mi) from Niamey, Moumouni herded cattle with his family until his father died when he was 10.

Falling out with his brother, he ran away to the capital, where he lived on the street for two years until his talent attracted the attention of a music teacher, and he was taken on as an apprentice. Mastering the traditional flute, he joined the Ballet National of Niger and then formed Mamar Kassey, an eight-man group featuring Moumouni and guitarist Abdallah Alhassane. Together they have toured West Africa, Europe, and the United States, and have become the most popular musical group in Niger.
