= Moussa Seybou Kassey =

Nigerien politician (1959–2020)

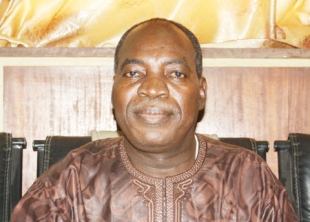
- Kassey in 2014
- Born: 1959; Dosso, Niger
- Died: 27 April 2020 (aged 60–61)
- Occupation: Politician

Moussa Seybou Kassey (1959 – 27 April 2020) was a Nigerien politician who was minister of public service and labor. He was a spokesperson of the government under the prime minister, Hama Amadou, from 17 September 2001 to 30 December 2004.

== Biography ==
Kassey studied economics and published the book La politique de planification urbaine au Niger : le cas de Niamey. He was chairman of the Mouvement Patriotique pour la Solidarité et le Progrès, a political party in Niger.

From 2014 until his death in 2020, he was director general of the Caisse Autonome des Retraites du Niger, an autonomous body which handled the financial management of pensions for Nigerien military personnel.

Kassey died on 27 April 2020.
