= Tende (drum) =

Unpitched percussion instrument

The tende (in northern areas, tindi) is a drum made out of a mortar, and the music associated with it, among the Tuareg people. It is constructed using a mortar (the kind typically used to crush grain) with a drumhead made from goatskin stretched over it, with tension applied to the drumhead by way of two long wooden pestles (ca. 1.25 meters long). On either end the skin is rolled around the two pestles, and then stretched over the mortar and fastened with a rope. Frequently the pestles are kept in place; they can serve to tighten the skin and thus tune the instrument. The skin needs to be moistened periodically; sometimes water is simply applied during the performance, but another method is to keep water in the mortar and moisten the skin from the inside by tilting the instrument.

Imzad music is held in higher esteem, but tende is played more frequently - during camel festivals, ceremonies, and certain types of dance. Its music is for ordinary people and requires no great skill or specialization to master, and is highly communal, involving singing, dancing, and clapping.

== History ==
Tende as a musical instrument might be relatively new, dating to the beginning of the twentieth century; Francis Rodd described one in 1926, in the Aïr area. Laura Boulton likely recorded one in 1934 in Timbuktu.
