= Takamba =

African native music and dance

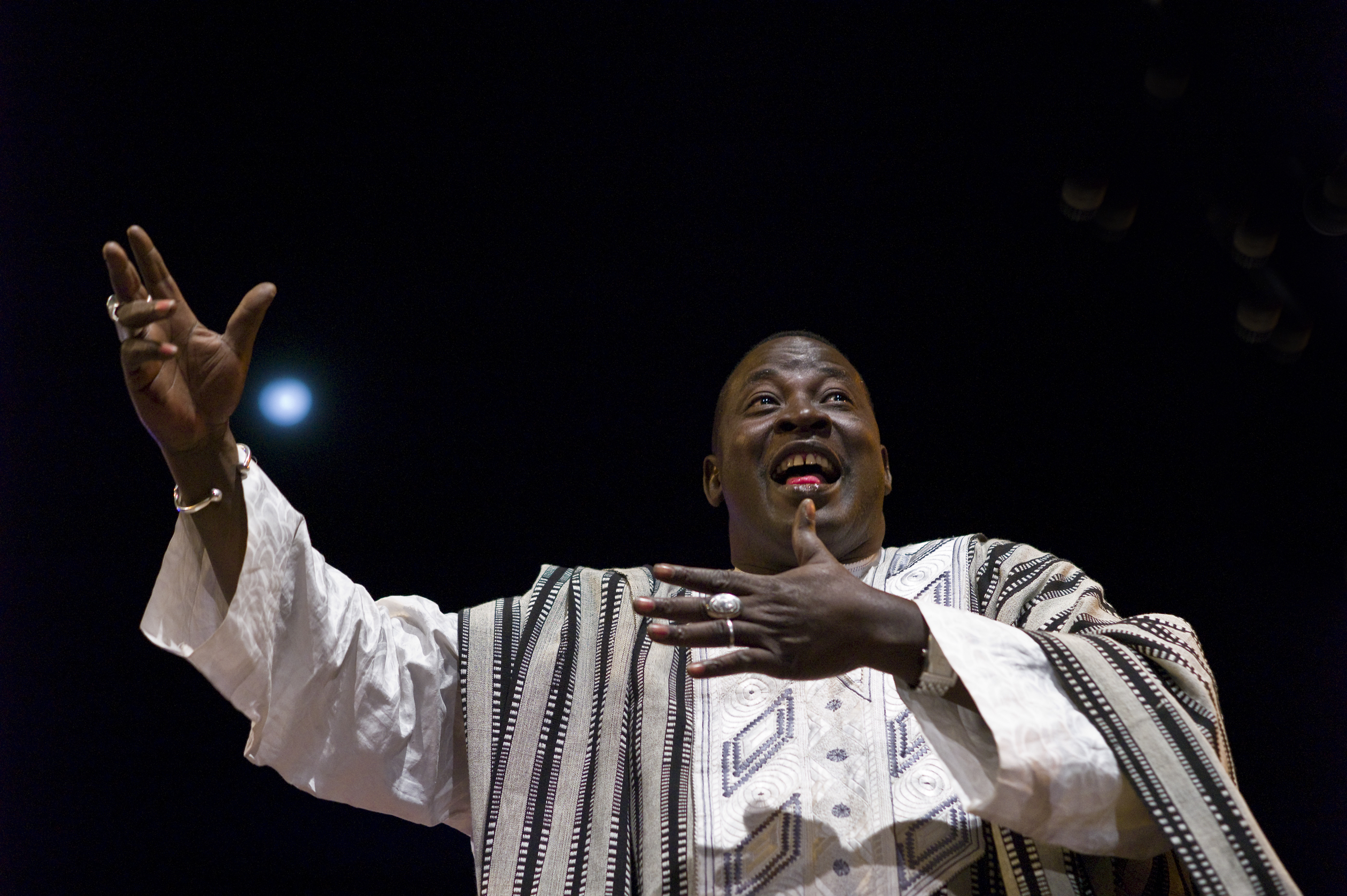
- Nigérien singer and flautist Yacouba Moumouni dancing Takamba
- Cultural origins: Songhai Empire

Regional scenes
- Mali, Niger

Other topics
- Bitti Harey

Takamba is a music and dance native to the Songhai and Tuareg peoples of Niger and Mali. It is both a musical composition and a dance. The musicians play a traditional instrument known as the Kurbu or Tehardent and a traditional African Calabash. The Takamba dance includes graceful and rhythmic movements performed both seated and standing where the shoulders and arms sway with the flow of the music.

== Origin ==
Takamba music and dance originated from the Songhai Empire. Before being known as Takamba, it was performed by the nomadic Tuareg griots and blacksmiths to celebrate the end of good harvest, cheer warriors back from the battle and to praise noble families. The griot in a sitting position, would play the ngoni or commonly known by the Tuareg as "tehardent". The word ‘Takamba’ has its etymology from the Songhai language which literally means "take the hand".
