= Sahel Sounds =

- Founder: Christopher Kirkley
- Status: Active
- Country of origin: U.S.
- Location: Portland, Oregon
- Official website: sahelsounds.com

Sahel Sounds is an American record label, based in Portland, Oregon, which specializes in music from the southern part of the Sahara desert.

== Details ==
Sahel Sounds was founded by Christopher Kirkley, a self-declared "amateur ethnomusicologist", who traveled to Africa in 2008 after hearing a CD by Afel Bocoum. Kirkley spent almost two years in Mauritania, Mali, and Niger. When he returned, he started the label, which releases albums frequently recorded by Kirkley in the field. Some of the earliest releases were songs collected from musicians' cellphones, under the title Music from Saharan Cellphones. Problems there included finding out who these artists were so he could get the right permissions and to pay them for their music; he says that the artists received 60% of the proceeds from the first album. One of the artists featured on these compilations was Mdou Moctar, whom Kirkley convinced afterward to star in a remake of the Prince film Purple Rain.

As an effort to steer clear of cultural appropriation, he claims complete transparency about finances, and divides all profits equally between the group and the label.

== Artists ==
- Ahmedou Ahmed Lowla
- Ahmed Ag Kaedy
- DJ Diaki
- Etran de L'Aïr
- Kader Tarhanin
- Les Filles de Illighadad
- Luka Productions
- Mamman Sani
- Mdou Moctar
- Tallawit Timbouctou
- Hama

== Compilations ==
- Music from Saharan Cellphones
- Music From Saharan Cellphones, Volume 2
- Music from Saharan WhatsApp

== See also ==
- Desert blues
