= Hausa music =

Music of the Hausa people of West and Central Africa

The Hausa are one of the largest ethnic groups in Nigeria, Niger, Ghana, Sudan, Cameroon and in many other West and Central African countries. Their folk music has played an important part in the development of Nigerian music, contributing such elements as the Goje, a one-stringed fiddle. There are two broad categories of traditional Hausa music: rural folk music and urban court music. They introduced the African pop culture genre that is still popular today.

Ceremonial music (rokon fada) is performed as a status symbol, and musicians are generally chosen for political reasons as opposed to musical ones. Ceremonial music can be heard at the weekly sara, a statement of authority by the emir which takes place every Thursday evening.

Courtly praise-singers like the renowned Ibrahim Narambada, are devoted to singing the virtues of a patron, such as a sultan or emir. Praise songs are accompanied by kettledrums and kalangu talking drums, along with the kakaki, a kind of long trumpet derived from that used by the Songhai cavalry.

Rural folk music includes styles that accompany the young girls' asauwara dance and the bòòríí or Bori religion both well known for their music. It has been brought as far north as Tripoli, Libya by trans-Saharan trade. The bòòríí cult features trance music, played by calabash, lute or fiddle. During ceremonies, women and other marginalized groups fall into trances and perform odd behaviors, such as mimicking a pig or sexual behavior. These persons are said to be possessed by a character, each with its own litany (kírààrì). There are similar trance cults (the so-called "mermaid cults") found in the Niger Delta region.

Popular Hausa music artists include Muhamman Shata, who sings accompanied by drummers, Dan Maraya, who plays a one-stringed lute called a kuntikii, Audo Yaron Goje, who plays the goje, and Ibrahim Na Habu, who plays a small fiddle called a kukkuma.
