= Desert blues =

Musical style of the Sahara region

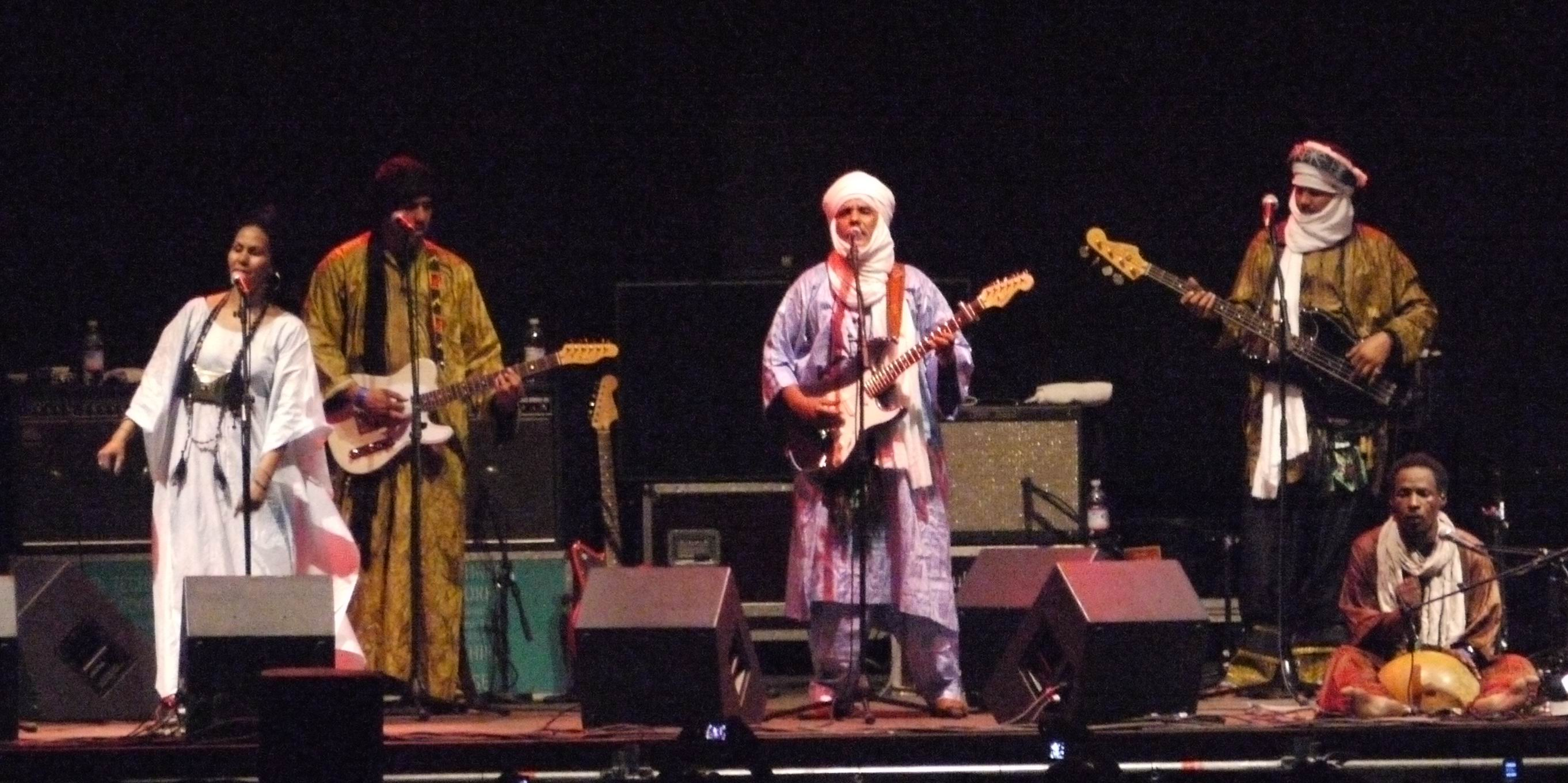
- Tuareg desert rock band Tinariwen performing in Nuremberg in 2010
- Native name: Tishoumaren, assouf
- Other names: Saharan rock; Mali blues; Tuareg rock
- Stylistic origins: Malian music; Tuareg music; Berber music; blues; rock
- Cultural origins: From 1980s to 1990s, Tuareg people in North Africa, West Africa and Sahara regions
- Typical instruments: electric guitar; electric bass; teherdent; tende; drum kit; calabash (percussion)

Regional scenes
- Mali; Niger; Algeria; Western Sahara

Tishoumaren (ⵜⵉⵛⵓⵎⴰⵔⴻⵏ in Neo-Tifinagh script) or assouf, internationally known as desert blues, is a style of music from the Sahara region of northern and west Africa. Critics describe the music as a fusion of blues and rock music from the United States, with Tuareg, Malian or North African music. Various other terms are used to describe it including desert rock, Saharan rock, Takamba, Mali blues, Tuareg rock or simply "guitar music". The style has been pioneered by Tuareg musicians in the Sahara region, particularly in Mali, Niger, Libya, Algeria, Burkina Faso and others; with it also being developed by Sahrawi artists in Western Sahara.

The musical style took shape as an expression of the culture of the traditionally nomadic Tuareg people, amid their difficult sociopolitical situation, including rebellions, widespread displacement and exile in post-colonial Africa. The word Tishoumaren is derived from the French word chômeur, meaning "the unemployed".

The genre was first pioneered by and popularized outside of Africa by Ali Farka Touré and later Tinariwen. In recent years, artists like Mdou Moctar and Bombino have continued to adapt Saharan rock music and have achieved international success.

== Historical background ==
The Tuareg people live in a region of North and West Africa that covers large portions of the Sahara across the modern-day national boundaries of Mali, Algeria, Niger, Libya, and Chad, and to a lesser extent, reaching into Burkina Faso and Nigeria. They had been nomadic pastoralists involved in trans-Saharan trade for many hundreds of years.

At the turn of the 20th century, the Tuareg were subjected to French colonial rule, after a lengthy resistance movement and defeated rebellion. With the departure of colonial powers in the 1950s and 1960s, the lands inhabited by the Tuareg population were split primarily between the six new countries of Mali, Algeria, Niger, Libya, Burkina Faso and Chad, making them ethnic minorities across the region. For the next few decades, natural resources diminished due to increasing desertification and the Tuareg minorities have since been involved in a series of conflicts and rebellions, creating hardship for the survival of Tuareg people and their culture.

In 1973, a major drought forced many of the Tamasheq-speaking people throughout the deserts to reconsider their traditional way of life as nomadic herders. Many took refuge in urban centers across the region, but with many lacking formal education, the Tamasheq were largely unemployed. The term ishumar began to be used describing young Tamasheq. A unique culture began to arise among many of the economically and politically marginalized youths, sometimes rebellious or revolutionary in nature, reasserting a cultural pride.

Many young men, including future members of Tinariwen, took employment in a Tamasheq military unit being assembled by Libyan military leader Muammar al-Gaddafi. Besides receiving military training and weapons in the Gaddafi-sponsored camps, many of the young Tamasheq men were also exposed to revolutionary ideas, pan-Africanism, and popular music. In the decades to follow, the Tamasheq were involved in extended episodes of violence and rebellion against the various governments in the region, both as victim and perpetrator. The stories of socio-political unrest have been relayed through music, contributing to and partially shaping the Tamasheq people's culture and ideals.

== Ishumar ==
The music of the young, uprooted men who often wandered from town to town was guitar-driven, first acoustic and then electric. These were the men referred to as ishumar, a term derived from the French word chômeur, a term for an unemployed person. The originators of the musical genre were Tinariwen, a group of musicians within camps sponsored by Gaddafi who formed their group in 1979. Tinariwen was the first Tamasheq group to feature electric guitars; they are considered the originator of the style. During rebellion against the government of Mali, Tinariwen's music was spread via audio cassette through the camps. In the early 1990s the group began to gain wider exposure through association with the French band Lo'jo. Additional distribution methods, particularly mp3s on mobile phones, and music festivals like Festival au Désert, aided in increasing the styles popularity during the 2000s and 2010s.

== Musical style ==
The style mixes electric blues with Middle Eastern and African sounds.

Songs are generally sung in Tamasheq language. Lyrics have been described as being rooted in traditional Tuareg poetry, with topics including rebellion, war and beauty, and often mention the Sahara desert itself. Homesickness and longing for maintaining Tuareg traditions in the face of exile is also explored.

Musically, the tende drum and three-stringed teherdent Malian lute are the roots of the style. Chaabi music of the Maghreb is another influence. Many Saharan rock musicians have cited Jimi Hendrix as a key influence, including Mdou Moctar, who has been described as the "Hendrix of the Sahara".

In recent years, some artists have further adapted the sound to introduce more typical Western rock instrumentation, such as replacing traditional percussion with drum kits. The energetic music of Songhoy Blues, Mdou Moctar, Amadou & Mariam, and Bab L' Bluz has subsequently been labeled as "desert punk" and psychedelic rock. Several fusion albums such as The West African Blues Project by Touré Kunda vocalist Modou Toure and British blues guitarist Ramon Goose have provided further exploration mixing western-style blues with indigenous music from the Sahara and sub-Saharan regions. A new generation of desert blues artists such as Tissilawen began emerging in the mid 2000s, continuing to gain popularity through 2025.

== See also ==
- African blues
- Festival au Désert
- Sahel Sounds
- The Rough Guide to Desert Blues
- The Rough Guide to African Blues
