= List of 2021 albums (July–December) =

The following is a list of albums, EPs, and mixtapes released in the second half of 2021. These albums are (1) original, i.e. excluding reissues, remasters, and compilations of previously released recordings, and (2) notable, defined as having received significant coverage from reliable sources independent of the subject.

For additional information about bands formed, reformed, disbanded, or on hiatus, for deaths of musicians, and for links to musical awards, see 2021 in music.

For information on albums released in the first half of 2021, see List of 2021 albums (January–June).

== Third quarter ==
=== July ===
List of albums released in July 2021
Go to: July | August | September | October | November | December | Back to top
Release date	Artist	Album	Genre	Label	Ref.
July 1	Antiguo Autómata Mexicano	20+ Piano Improvisations		Static Discos	
July 2	At the Gates	The Nightmare of Being	Melodic death metal	Century	
July 2	Bobby Gillespie and Jehnny Beth	Utopian Ashes		Third Man	
July 2	Bomba Estéreo	Deja		Sony Music Latin	
July 2	Born of Osiris	Angel or Alien	Progressive metalcore, symphonic metal, djent	Sumerian	
July 2	G Herbo	25	Trap	Republic	
July 2	The Go! Team	Get Up Sequences Part One	Indie pop, funk	Memphis Industries	
July 2	Jimmy Barnes	Flesh and Blood		Bloodlines Records	
July 2	Jonathan Wolff	Seinfeld (Original Television Soundtrack)			
July 2	Jxdn	Tell Me About Tomorrow	Pop-punk	DTA Records, Elektra	
July 2	Laura Mvula	Pink Noise	Electropop, R&B, synth-funk	Atlantic	
July 5	SF9	Turn Over		FNC	
July 5	Soyeon	Windy	K-pop, k-hip-hop	Cube	
July 8	Ashwarya	Nocturnal Hours		Noize Recordings	
July 8	Zelooperz	Van Gogh's Left Ear			
July 9	Charlotte Day Wilson	Alpha	Alternative R&B, soul	Stone Woman Music	
July 9	DZ Deathrays	Positive Rising: Part 2		I Oh You	
July 9	Foodman	Yasuragi Land		Hyperdub	
July 9	Frances Forever	Paranoia Party		Mom + Pop	
July 9	The Goon Sax	Mirror II		Matador	
July 9	Half Waif	Mythopoetics		Anti-	
July 9	Hybrid	Black Halo		Distinctive	
July 9	IDK	USee4Yourself	Hip-hop	Clue No Clue, Warner	
July 9	Inhaler	It Won't Always Be Like This	Indie rock	Polydor	
July 9	Jess & Matt	Wildflowers		Jess & Matt	
July 9	Jimmy Jam and Terry Lewis	Jam & Lewis: Volume One		Flyte Tyme Records, BMG	
July 9	Koreless	Agor		Young	
July 9	Les Filles de Illighadad	At Pioneer Works	Tuareg blues	Sahel, Pioneer Works Press	
July 9	The Maine	XOXO: From Love and Anxiety in Real Time	Indie pop, pop rock	8123	
July 9	Mariah the Scientist	Ry Ry World		RCA, One Umbrella	
July 9	Mayhem	Atavistic Black Disorder / Kommando		Century	
July 9	Rejjie Snow	Baw Baw Black Sheep		BMG	
July 9	Snoh Aalegra	Temporary Highs in the Violet Skies	R&B	ARTium, Roc Nation	
July 9	Tkay Maidza	Last Year Was Weird (Vol. 3)		4AD, Dew Process	
July 9	Twin Shadow	Twin Shadow		Cheree Cheree	
July 9	Various artists	Space Jam: A New Legacy (Original Motion Picture Soundtrack)		Republic, WaterTower	
July 9	Vince Staples	Vince Staples	Hip-hop	Blacksmith Recordings, Capitol, Motown, EMI	
July 9	The Wallflowers	Exit Wounds	Rock, Americana, power pop	New West	
July 10	Nancy Ajram	Nancy 10	Arabic pop, dance-pop	In2Musica	
July 13	Aaron Dilloway and Lucrecia Dalt	Lucy & Aaron		Hanson	
July 14	Connan Mockasin and Ade	It's Just Wind		Mexican Summer	
July 15	Anna Meredith	Bumps Per Minute (18 Studies for Dodgems)		Moshi Moshi	
July 15	Jawny	The Story of Hugo			
July 15	Suboi	No-Nê			
July 15	Yonaka	Seize the Power			
July 15	Yves Tumor	The Asymptotical World	Experimental rock, nu gaze	Warp	
July 16	Barbie Almalbis	Scenes from Inside		Sony Music Philippines	
July 16	Barenaked Ladies	Detour de Force	Pop rock	Raisin' Records	
July 16	Blondie	Blondie: Vivir En La Habana			
July 16	Cakes da Killa	Muvaland Vol. 2		He.She.They	
July 16	Chet Faker	Hotel Surrender		Detail Records, BMG	
July 16	Chloe Flower	Chloe Flower		Sony Classical	
July 16	Clairo	Sling		Fader Label, Republic	
July 16	Drakeo the Ruler	Ain't That the Truth		Stinc Team, Empire	
July 16	Enny	Under 25		FAMM	
July 16	Gang of Youths	Total Serene		Warner Music UK, Mosy Music	
July 16	Illenium	Fallen Embers		12Tone Music	
July 16	John Mayer	Sob Rock	Pop rock, soft rock	Columbia	
July 16	K.D.A.P.	Influences		Arts and Crafts	
July 16	KSI	All Over the Place		RBC, BMG	
July 16	Linn da Quebrada	Trava línguas			
July 16	Midland	The Last Resort	Country, neotraditional country	Big Machine	
July 16	A Place to Bury Strangers	Hologram		Dedstrange	
July 16	Pop Smoke	Faith	Drill, trap, hip-hop	Victor Victor, Republic	
July 16	Powerwolf	Call of the Wild	Power metal, heavy metal, symphonic metal	Napalm	
July 16	Rodrigo Amarante	Drama		Polyvinyl	
July 16	Stephen Fretwell	Busy Guy		Speedy Wunderground	
July 16	Tedeschi Trucks Band	Layla Revisited (Live at Lockn')		Fantasy	
July 16	Times of Grace	Songs of Loss and Separation		Roadrunner	
July 16	Tones and I	Welcome to the Madhouse	Pop	Bad Batch Records	
July 16	U-Roy	Solid Gold U-Roy		Trojan Jamaica, BMG	
July 16	Wavves	Hideaway	Power pop, indie rock, pop-punk	Fat Possum	
July 16	Willow	Lately I Feel Everything		Roc Nation	
July 17	Dee Gees	Hail Satin	Disco, rock	RCA	
July 17	Various artists	May the Circle Remain Unbroken: A Tribute to Roky Erickson	Psychedelic rock	Light in the Attic	
July 18	Luísa Sonza	Doce 22	Pop	Universal	
July 22	SB19	Pagsibol		Sony Music	
July 23	Alexis Marshall	House of Lull. House of When		Sargent House	
July 23	Alice Skye	I Feel Better but I Don't Feel Good		Bad Apples	
July 23	Altın Gün	Âlem		ATO	
July 23	Anika	Change		Sacred Bones	
July 23	Anne-Marie	Therapy	Pop, R&B	Major Tom's, Asylum	
July 23	Attila	Closure	Nu metalcore		
July 23	Beatriz Ferreyra	Canto+		Room40	
July 23	Brittany Howard	Jaime (Reimagined)		ATO	
July 23	Christone "Kingfish" Ingram	662	Blues	Alligator	
July 23	Darkside	Spiral	Electronic	Matador	
July 23	Dave	We're All Alone in This Together		Neighbourhood Recordings	
July 23	David Crosby	For Free	Rock	BMG	
July 23	Descendents	9th & Walnut	Punk rock, melodic hardcore	Epitaph	
July 23	Gavin Turek	Madame Gold			
July 23	DPR Live	Iite Cool			
July 23	Joel Culpepper	Sgt Culpepper			
July 23	Joshua Radin	The Ghost and the Wall		Nettwerk	
July 23	Jackson Browne	Downhill from Everywhere	Rock	Inside	
July 23	The Jungle Giants	Love Signs		Amplifire Music	
July 23	Leon Bridges	Gold-Diggers Sound	Alternative R&B	Columbia	
July 23	Mega Bog	Life, and Another	Folk-pop	Paradise of Bachelors	
July 23	Molly Burch	Romantic Images		Captured Tracks	
July 23	Nothing but Thieves	Moral Panic II			
July 23	Obongjayar and Sarz	Sweetness			
July 23	Rodney Crowell	Triage		RC1, Thirty Tigers	
July 23	Samia	Scout			
July 23	Tommy Torres	El Playlist de Anoche	Latin pop	Rimas Entertainment	
July 23	Yes/And (Meg Duffy and Joel Ford)	Yes/And		Driftless Recordings	
July 23	Yngwie Malmsteen	Parabellum		Mascot	
July 23	Yung Bleu	Moon Boy	Hip-hop, R&B, trap	Empire	
July 25	BbyMutha	Cherrytape			
July 26	AKMU	Next Episode	Synth-pop, retrowave, downtempo	YG	
July 26	D.O.	Empathy	K-pop	SM	
July 28	Sam Mehran	Cold Brew		Weird World	
July 28	Twice	Perfect World	J-pop	Warner Music Japan	
July 29	Jon Batiste	Live at Electric Lady			
July 30	Billie Eilish	Happier Than Ever		Darkroom, Interscope	
July 30	Bleachers	Take the Sadness Out of Saturday Night	Synth-pop, indie pop, slowcore	RCA	
July 30	Blues Traveler	Traveler's Blues		Round Hill	
July 30	Chunk! No, Captain Chunk!	Gone Are the Good Days	Pop-punk, easycore	Fearless	
July 30	Creeper	American Noir	gothic rock, glam rock, art rock	Roadrunner	
July 30	Curtismith	Museo		Pool Records	
July 30	Dave East and Harry Fraud	Hoffa			
July 30	Dee Snider	Leave a Scar		Napalm	
July 30	Dot Allison	Heart-Shaped Scars		SA Recordings	
July 30	Dreamcatcher	Summer Holiday		Dreamcatcher Company	
July 30	Durand Jones & The Indications	Private Space		Dead Oceans	
July 30	Isaiah Rashad	The House Is Burning	Hip-hop	Top Dawg	
July 30	Kasper Bjørke	Sprinkles			
July 30	King Woman	Celestial Blues	Doom metal, grunge, post-rock	Relapse	
July 30	L Devine	Near Life Experience: Part 1		Warner	
July 30	Logic	Bobby Tarantino III	Hip-hop	Def Jam, Visionary	
July 30	Los Lobos	Native Sons		New West	
July 30	Lump (Laura Marling and Mike Lindsay)	Animal		Partisan, Chrysalis	
July 30	Parker McCollum	Gold Chain Cowboy	Country	MCA Nashville	
July 30	Parmalee	For You	Country	Stoney Creek	
July 30	Peppa Pig	Peppa's Adventures: The Album		eOne	
July 30	Prince	Welcome 2 America	Funk, soul, rock	NPG	
July 30	Ryuichi Sakamoto	Minamata (Original Motion Picture Soundtrack)		Milan	
July 30	Sarkodie	No Pressure	Hip-hop, Afrobeats	Sarkcess Music, Ziiki Media	
July 30	Shirley Collins	Crowlink		Domino	
July 30	Son Volt	Electro Melodier		Transmit Sound, Thirty Tigers	
July 30	Sycco	Sycco's First EP		Future Classic	
July 30	Tink	Heat of the Moment			
July 30	Torres	Thirstier	Rock, synth-pop	Merge	
July 30	Underdark	Our Bodies Burned Bright Upon Re-Entry		Surviving Sounds, Through Love Records, Tridroid Records	
July 30	Voices	An Audience of Mannequins		Church Road Records	
July 30	Yola	Stand for Myself	Americana, country soul, pop	Easy Eye Sound, Concord	
July 30	Young Dolph and various artists	Paper Route Illuminati		Paper Route Empire	

=== August ===
List of albums released in August 2021
Go to: July | August | September | October | November | December | Back to top
Release date	Artist	Album	Genre	Label	Ref.
August 1	Jóhann Jóhannsson	Gold Dust		3221466 Records	
August 2	Astro	Switch On	K-pop	Fantagio	
August 2	Naked Raygun	Over the Overlords	Punk rock	Wax Trax!	
August 3	Ty Segall	Harmonizer	Psychedelic rock	Drag City	
August 3	Voice of Baceprot	The Other Side of Metalism		12Wired	
August 4	Bish	Going to Destruction	Punk rock	Avex Trax	
August 4	Young Nudy	Rich Shooter		RCA	
August 6	As December Falls	Happier		ADF Records	
August 6	Anne Wilson	My Jesus (Live in Nashville)	CCM, Christian country	Sparrow, Capitol CMG	
August 6	Foxing	Draw Down the Moon	Indie rock, pop rock	Hopeless	
August 6	Fredo	Independence Day		Since 93, RCA	
August 6	Geoffrey O'Connor	For as Long as I Can Remember		Chapter	
August 6	Glaive	All Dogs Go to Heaven		Interscope	
August 6	Ider	Shame		Ider	
August 6	Kississippi	Mood Ring		Triple Crown	
August 6	Laura Stevenson	Laura Stevenson		Don Giovanni	
August 6	Liars	The Apple Drop		Mute	
August 6	Lingua Ignota	Sinner Get Ready	Avant-garde	Sargent House	
August 6	Lion Babe	Rainbow Child			
August 6	Moritz von Oswald Trio	Dissent		Modern Recordings	
August 6	Mr Jukes & Barney Artist	The Locket		Locket Records	
August 6	Nas	King's Disease II		Mass Appeal	
August 6	Night Ranger	ATBPO		Frontiers	
August 6	Rick Price	Soulville		Sony Music Australia	
August 6	Spice	10		VP	
August 6	Sponge	Lavatorium		Cleopatra	
August 6	Sunmi	1/6	Pop	Abyss Company	
August 6	Tinashe	333	R&B	Tinashe Music Inc.	
August 6	Tom Cardy	Artificial Intelligence	Comedy		
August 6	Willy Mason	Already Dead		Cooking Vinyl	
August 9	The Boyz	Thrill-ing	Hip-hop	Cre.Ker Entertainment	
August 10	Jeff Ament	I Should Be Outside		Monkeywrench	
August 10	Mike and the Moonpies	One to Grow On			
August 13	Ben Platt	Reverie		Atlantic	
August 13	Benny the Butcher	Pyrex Picasso		Rare Scrilla, BSF	
August 13	Blacktop Mojo	Blacktop Mojo		Sand Hill	
August 13	Brandee Younger	Somewhere Different	Classical, R&B, hip-hop	Impulse!	
August 13	Boldy James and The Alchemist	Bo Jackson			
August 13	Dan + Shay	Good Things	Country	Warner Nashville	
August 13	Devendra Banhart and Noah Georgeson	Refuge		Dead Oceans	
August 13	Iggy Azalea	The End of an Era		Bad Dreams, Empire	
August 13	Jade Bird	Different Kinds of Light		Glassnote	
August 13	Joey Cape	A Good Year to Forget		Fat Wreck Chords	
August 13	Jungle	Loving in Stereo		Caiola	
August 13	Ka	A Martyr's Reward	Hip-hop	Iron Works Records	
August 13	The Killers	Pressure Machine	Americana, heartland rock, folk rock	Island	
August 13	Luke Hemmings	When Facing the Things We Turn Away From		Sony Australia	
August 13	Meet Me at the Altar	Model Citizen	Pop-punk, easycore	Fueled by Ramen	
August 13	Polish Club	Now We're Cookin'		Double Double Records, Island Australia	
August 13	Quicksand	Distant Populations		Epitaph	
August 13	Slaughter to Prevail	Kostolom		Sumerian	
August 13	Still Woozy	If This Isn't Nice, I Don't Know What Is		Interscope	
August 13	Suicideboys	Long Term Effects of Suffering	Underground hip-hop, trap	G*59	
August 13	Trash Boat	Don't You Feel Amazing?		Hopeless	
August 13	Watchhouse	Watchhouse		Tiptoe Tiger Music, Thirty Tigers	
August 13	YNW Melly	Just a Matter of Slime		300, Atlantic	
August 15	Adoy	Her		Angel House	
August 16	Red Velvet	Queendom	Dance-pop, R&B, soul	SM, Dreamus	
August 17	CIX	Ok Prologue: Be Ok	K-pop	C9	
August 18	Official Hige Dandism	Editorial		Irori Records	
August 19	Cravity	The Awakening: Written in the Stars	K-pop	Starship	
August 19	Marina Sena	De Primeira	Música popular brasileira		
August 20	Anderson East	Maybe We Never Die		Low Country Sound	
August 20	Angel Olsen	Aisles		somethingscosmic	
August 20	Angus & Julia Stone	Life Is Strange			
August 20	Between the Buried and Me	Colors II	Progressive metal, technical death metal, progressive rock	Sumerian	
August 20	Bnny	Everything		Fire Talk Records	
August 20	Damon & Naomi	A Sky Record		20 20 20	
August 20	Deafheaven	Infinite Granite	Shoegaze, post-rock	Sargent House	
August 20	Debbie Gibson	The Body Remembers	Pop	StarGirl Records	
August 20	Del Barber	Stray Dogs (Collected B-Sides / Vol. 1)		Acronym Records	
August 20	Disclosure	Never Enough			
August 20	Dvsn and Ty Dolla Sign	Cheers to the Best Memories	R&B	OVO Sound, Warner	
August 20	Holy Holy	Hello My Beautiful World		Wonderlick, Sony Music Australia	
August 20	Jake Bugg	Saturday Night, Sunday Morning	Blues rock	RCA	
August 20	James McMurtry	The Horses and the Hounds		New West	
August 20	The Joy Formidable	Into the Blue	Alternative rock, post-punk, alternative metal	Hassle	
August 20	Lil Lotus	Errør Bøy	Pop-punk	Epitaph	
August 20	Lorde	Solar Power		Universal Music New Zealand	
August 20	Maarja Nuut	Hinged			
August 20	Maggie Rose	Have a Seat			
August 20	Martha Wainwright	Love Will Be Reborn		Pheromone, Cooking Vinyl	
August 20	Necronautical	Slain in the Spirit	Black metal	Candlelight	
August 20	Orla Gartland	Woman on the Internet	Indie pop	New Friends Music	
August 20	Pile	Songs Known Together, Alone		Exploding in Sound	
August 20	Quickly, Quickly	The Long and Short of It		Ghostly International	
August 20	Sam Williams	Glasshouse Children	Country, folk, rock	Universal Nashville	
August 20	Shane Nicholson	Living in Colour		Lost Highway Australia	
August 20	Shannon and the Clams	Year of the Spider		Easy Eye Sound	
August 20	Shaun Ryder	Visits from Future Technology		SWRX Recordings	
August 20	Sierra Ferrell	Long Time Coming	Americana, bluegrass	Rounder	
August 20	Sturgill Simpson	The Ballad of Dood and Juanita	Bluegrass	High Top Mountain	
August 20	Switchfoot	Interrobang	Alternative rock	Fantasy	
August 20	Trippie Redd	Trip at Knight	Trap, emo rap, hyperpop	1400 Entertainment, 10K Projects	
August 20	Tropical Fuck Storm	Deep States		Joyful Noise, TFS Records	
August 20	Villagers	Fever Dreams			
August 20	Vistas	What Were You Hoping to Find?		Retrospect Records	
August 20	Wanda Jackson	Encore		Big Machine, Blackheart	
August 20	Westside Gunn	Hitler Wears Hermes 8: Sincerely Adolf			
August 20	Wolves in the Throne Room	Primordial Arcana		Century Media	
August 23	Stray Kids	Noeasy	Hip-hop	JYP	
August 25	Men I Trust	Untourable Album	Indie pop, dream pop, downtempo		
August 26	Gorillaz	Meanwhile	Reggae	Parlophone	
August 26	Jay B	SOMO:Fume	R&B	H1ghr	
August 26	María Becerra	Animal	Reggaeton, latin pop	300	
August 26	Patti Smith	Live at Electric Lady		Kundudo, Columbia	
August 27	((( O )))	((( 3 )))		The Sundrop Garden	
August 27	Andrew Cyrille	The News	Jazz	ECM	
August 27	Belly	See You Next Wednesday		XO, Roc Nation	
August 27	Bendik Giske	Cracks	Ambient, jazz	Smalltown Supersound	
August 27	Big Red Machine	How Long Do You Think It's Gonna Last?	Pop	Jagjaguwar, 37d03d	
August 27	Bliss n Eso	The Sun		Flight Deck, Mushroom	
August 27	Botanist & Thief	Cicatrix/Diamond Brush			
August 27	The Bronx	Bronx VI		Cooking Vinyl	
August 27	The Bug	Fire		Ninja Tune	
August 27	Chubby and the Gang	The Mutt's Nuts		Partisan	
August 27	Chvrches	Screen Violence	Pop, synth-pop	Glassnote	
August 27	Emma Blackery	Girl in a Box		AntiFragile Music	
August 27	E*vax	E*vax		Because	
August 27	Goat	Headsoup		Rocket Recordings	
August 27	Graham Coxon	Superstate		Z2 Comics	
August 27	Grayscale	Umbra		Fearless	
August 27	Gretta Ray	Begin to Look Around		EMI Australia	
August 27	Grip	I Died for This!?	Hip-hop	Stray Society, Shady, Interscope	
August 27	Halsey	If I Can't Have Love, I Want Power	Alternative rock, soft grunge, pop-punk	Capitol	
August 27	Indigo De Souza	Any Shape You Take	Grunge, indie rock, synth-pop	Saddle Creek	
August 27	Jason Eady	To the Passage of Time		Old Guitar Records	
August 27	Jinjer	Wallflowers		Napalm	
August 27	Leprous	Aphelion		Inside Out	
August 27	Madi Diaz	History of a Feeling	Indie rock	Anti-	
August 27	Maisie Peters	You Signed Up for This		Gingerbread Man	
August 27	Marisa Anderson and William Tyler	Lost Futures	Ambient, blues, Americana	Thrill Jockey	
August 27	Mouse Rat	Awesome Album		Dualtone	
August 27	Ngaiire	3		Dot Dash	
August 27	Niko Moon	Good Time	Country	RCA Nashville	
August 27	Nite Jewel	No Sun		Gloriette	
August 27	NMB	Innocence & Danger	Progressive rock	Inside Out	
August 27	OneRepublic	Human	Pop, pop rock	Mosley, Interscope	
August 27	Steve Gunn	Other You			
August 27	Teenage Bottlerocket	Sick Sesh!		Fat Wreck Chords	
August 27	Terence Blanchard	Absence	Jazz	Blue Note	
August 27	Toad the Wet Sprocket	Starting Now	Alternative rock	Abe's Records, The SRG/ILS Group	
August 27	Toyah	Posh Pop	Pop rock	Demon Music	
August 27	Turnstile	Glow On	Hardcore punk, melodic hardcore, alternative rock	Roadrunner	
August 27	With Confidence	With Confidence		Hopeless	
August 27	Yann Tiersen	Kerber		Mute	
August 29	Ben&Ben	Pebble House, Vol. 1: Kuwaderno	Indie folk, folk-pop, pop rock	Sindikato, Sony Music Philippines	
August 29	Kanye West	Donda		GOOD Music, Def Jam	

=== September ===
List of albums released in September 2021
Go to: July | August | September | October | November | December | Back to top
Release date	Artist	Album	Genre	Label	Ref.
September 1	B.O.L.T	Attitude		King	
September 1	Dialogue	Dialogue+1			
September 1	Julien Baker	Little Oblivion Remixes		Matador	
September 1	Sard Underground	Orange Iro ni Kanpai		Giza Studio	
September 2	J Balvin	Jose	Reggaeton	Universal Latin	
September 2	Monogem	Gardenia	Latin R&B	Monogem	
September 3	Auri	II: Those We Don't Speak Of		Nuclear Blast	
September 3	Bokassa	Molotov Rocktail		Napalm	
September 3	Carnifex	Graveside Confessions	Deathcore, symphonic black metal	Nuclear Blast	
September 3	Chris de Burgh	The Legend of Robin Hood		Justin Time	
September 3	Cory Wong and Dirty Loops	Turbo		Roundwound Media	
September 3	Drake	Certified Lover Boy	Hip-hop	OVO Sound, Republic	
September 3	F.S. Blumm and Nils Frahm	2X1=4		Leiter	
September 3	Imagine Dragons	Mercury – Act 1		Kidinakorner, Interscope	
September 3	Iron Maiden	Senjutsu	Heavy metal	Parlophone, BMG	
September 3	Iwan Fals	Pun Aku		Musica	
September 3	Jhay Cortez	Timelezz		Universal Music Latino	
September 3	Lady Gaga	Dawn of Chromatica	Pop, hyperpop	Streamline, Interscope	
September 3	LANY	Gg bb xx	Pop, electropop	Polydor	
September 3	Lauren Alaina	Sitting Pretty on Top of the World	Country	Mercury Nashville	
September 3	Lawrence English	A Mirror Holds the Sky		Room40	
September 3	Little Simz	Sometimes I Might Be Introvert	Hip-hop, soul, R&B	Age 101 Music, AWAL	
September 3	Laura Nyro	American Dreamer		Madfish	
September 3	Priya Ragu	Damnshestamil		Warner	
September 3	Ronnie Wood	Mr. Luck – A Tribute to Jimmy Reed: Live at the Royal Albert Hall			
September 3	Suuns	The Witness	Post-punk, post-rock, Krautrock	Joyful Noise, Secret City	
September 3	Usain Bolt	Country Yutes			
September 3	Various artists	Cinderella (Original Motion Picture Soundtrack)	Pop rock	Epic, Columbia	
September 3	The Wildhearts	21st Century Love Songs	Rock	Graphite Records	
September 6	STAYC	Stereotype		High Up Entertainment, Kakao	
September 6	Young K	Eternal	K-pop	JYP	
September 7	Baek A-yeon	Observe		Eden Entertainment	
September 9	Brymo	9: Èsan	Alternative rock, afro-soul, sentimental ballad	Brymo	
September 9	Brymo	9: Harmattan & Winter	Alternative rock, folk music, sentimental ballad	Brymo	
September 9	Lee Hi	4 Only	R&B, synth-pop, jazz	AOMG	
September 9	Lorde	Te Ao Mārama		Universal Music New Zealand	
September 10	Amyl and the Sniffers	Comfort to Me		B2B Records, Flightless	
September 10	Andrew W.K.	God Is Partying	Hard rock	Napalm	
September 10	Anette Olzon	Strong	Symphonic metal	Frontiers	
September 10	AZ	Doe or Die II	Hip-hop	Quiet Money Records	
September 10	Baby Keem	The Melodic Blue	Hip-hop, trap	pgLang, Columbia	
September 10	The Band Camino	The Band Camino		Elektra	
September 10	Béla Fleck	My Bluegrass Heart	Bluegrass	Renew Records	
September 10	Colleen Green	Cool		Hardly Art	
September 10	Common	A Beautiful Revolution Pt. 2	Conscious hip-hop	Loma Vista	
September 10	Don Diablo	Forever		Hexagon	
September 10	Dori Freeman	Ten Thousand Roses		Blue Hens Music	
September 10	Drapht	Shadows and Shinings		The Ayems	
September 10	Geoffrey Gurrumul Yunupingu	The Gurrumul Story		Decca Australia	
September 10	Gift of Gab	Finding Inspiration Somehow			
September 10	Hawthorne Heights	The Rain Just Follows Me	Pop-punk, emo, alternative rock	Pure Noise	
September 10	Heartless Bastards	A Beautiful Life		Sweet Unknown Records, Thirty Tigers	
September 10	Jazz Cartier	The Fleur Print			
September 10	Kacey Musgraves	Star-Crossed	Pop, country pop	MCA Nashville, Interscope	
September 10	King Krule	You Heat Me Up, You Cool Me Down			
September 10	Low	Hey What		Sub Pop	
September 10	Manic Street Preachers	The Ultra Vivid Lament	Pop rock	Columbia	
September 10	Martina Topley-Bird	Forever I Wait			
September 10	Masked Wolf	Astronomical		Teamwrk Records, ADA, Warner	
September 10	Matthew E. White	K Bay		Domino	
September 10	Nessa Barrett	Pretty Poison	Alternative pop, pop rock	Warner	
September 10	Pat Metheny	Side-Eye NYC (V1.IV)		Modern Recordings	
September 10	Saint Etienne	I've Been Trying to Tell You	Pop, ambient pop	Heavenly	
September 10	Samantha Fish	Faster	Hard rock, blues rock, country rock	Rounder	
September 10	Sarah Davachi	Antiphonals		Late Music	
September 10	Sleigh Bells	Texis	Noise pop, electropop, industrial rock	Mom + Pop	
September 10	Slothrust	Parallel Timeline		Dangerbird	
September 10	Sneaker Pimps	Squaring the Circle	Electronic, trip hop, indie pop	Unfall Productions	
September 10	Steps	What the Future Holds Pt. 2	Pop, dance-pop, electropop	BMG	
September 10	The Stranglers	Dark Matters		Coursegood	
September 10	Tigress	Pura Vida		Humble Angel Records	
September 10	Tim Hecker	The North Water Original Series Score		Invada, Lakeshore	
September 10	Tommy Genesis	Goldilocks X		Downtown	
September 10	Trophy Scars	Astral Pariah			
September 10	The Vaccines	Back in Love City		AWAL, Sony Music	
September 10	Various artists	The Metallica Blacklist		Blackened Recordings	
September 10	Virtual Riot	Simulation		Disciple Recordings	
September 10	Yebba	Dawn	Pop, R&B	RCA	
September 12	Abhi the Nomad	Abhi vs the Universe	Alternative hip-hop, jazz rap	UnderCurrent Entertainment	
September 15	Cancer Bats	You'll Never Break Us // Separation Sessions, Vol. 2			
September 15	Hubert Lenoir	Pictura De Ipse : Musique Directe		Worse Records, Terrible	
September 15	Injury Reserve	By the Time I Get to Phoenix	Experimental hip-hop, glitch hop		
September 17	Adia Victoria	A Southern Gothic			
September 17	Alexis Taylor	Silence		AWAL	
September 17	Alien Weaponry	Tangaroa	Groove metal, thrash metal, alternative metal	Napalm	
September 17	Billy Idol	The Roadside	Rock	Dark Horse	
September 17	Candlebox	Wolves	Grunge, hard rock, pop rock	Pavement Music	
September 17	Carcass	Torn Arteries	Melodic death metal	Nuclear Blast	
September 17	Carly Pearce	29: Written in Stone	Country	Big Machine	
September 17	Charlotte Wessels	Tales from Six Feet Under		Napalm	
September 17	Cynthia Erivo	Ch. 1 vs. 1		Verve	
September 17	Daughtry	Dearly Beloved		Dogtree Records, Alternative Distribution Alliance	
September 17	Eidola	The Architect	Post-hardcore, progressive rock,experimental rock	Rise	
September 17	Enrique Iglesias	Final (Vol. 1)		Sony Music	
September 17	The Felice Brothers	From Dreams to Dust		Yep Roc	
September 17	HTRK	Rhinestones		Heavy Machinery Records	
September 17	James Vincent McMorrow	Grapefruit Season		Sony Music UK	
September 17	Jordan Rakei	What We Call Life			
September 17	José González	Local Valley	Folk, indie folk	Mute, City Slang	
September 17	Lil Huddy	Teenage Heartbreak		Geffen	
September 17	Lil Nas X	Montero	Pop rap	Columbia	
September 17	Lindsey Buckingham	Lindsey Buckingham	Rock	Rhino	
September 17	M1llionz	Provisional License		Ten Percent Music Elite Group	
September 17	Mannarino	V			
September 17	Melissa Etheridge	One Way Out	Rock	BMG	
September 17	Mild High Club	Going Going Gone	Psychedelic pop	Stones Throw	
September 17	Mono	Pilgrimage of the Soul		Temporary Residence	
September 17	Moor Mother	Black Encyclopedia of the Air		Epitaph	
September 17	NCT 127	Sticker	Hip-hop, R&B, pop	SM, Dreamus, Virgin	
September 17	The Plot in You	Swan Song	Metalcore, post-hardcore	Fearless	
September 17	Rage	Resurrection Day	Power metal, heavy metal, thrash metal	SPV/Steamhammer	
September 17	Scotty McCreery	Same Truck	Country	Triple Tigers	
September 17	Spiritbox	Eternal Blue	Metalcore, post-metal, djent	Pale Chord Records, Rise	
September 17	St. Vincent	The Nowhere Inn		Loma Vista	
September 17	Thrice	Horizons/East	Post-hardcore, alternative rock, hard rock	Epitaph	
September 22	Midwxst	Back in Action	Hip-hop	Simple Stupid Records, Geffen	
September 24	Abraskadabra	Make Yourself at Home		Bad Time Records	
September 24	Alessia Cara	In the Meantime		Def Jam	
September 24	Alina Baraz	Sunbeam		UnitedMasters	
September 24	Amon Tobin	How Do You Live		Nomark Records	
September 24	Andy Shauf	Wilds		Anti-	
September 24	Angels & Airwaves	Lifeforms		Rise	
September 24	Anthony Hamilton	Love Is the New Black		My Music Box, BMG	
September 24	Badflower	This Is How the World Ends		Big Machine	
September 24	Bethel Music	Homecoming	Contemporary worship music	Bethel Music	
September 24	Billy Strings	Renewal		Rounder	
September 24	Blu	The Color Blu(e)			
September 24	Cold War Kids	New Age Norms 3			
September 24	Darlinghurst	Darlinghurst	Country		
September 24	Esperanza Spalding	Songwrights Apothecary Lab	Jazz, pop, rock	Concord	
September 24	Etherwood	Neon Dust		Hospital	
September 24	G-Eazy	These Things Happen Too		RCA, BPG, RVG	
September 24	Itzy	Crazy in Love	K-pop	JYP, Dreamus	
September 24	Japanese Breakfast	Sable (Original Video Game Soundtrack)	Ambient pop	Sony Masterworks, Dead Oceans	
September 24	Jesse Malin	Sad and Beautiful World		Wicked Cool	
September 24	Joey Purp	UpLate			
September 24	Mac McCaughan	The Sound of Yourself		Merge	
September 24	Mickey Guyton	Remember Her Name	Country, country pop	Capitol Nashville	
September 24	Nao	And Then Life Was Beautiful	R&B	RCA, Little Tokyo, Sony Music	
September 24	Natalie Imbruglia	Firebird	Pop	BMG	
September 24	The Ophelias	Crocus	Indie rock, indie folk	Joyful Noise	
September 24	Pop. 1280	Museum on the Horizon		Profound Lore	
September 24	Poppy	Flux	Alternative rock, grunge, pop-punk	Sumerian	
September 24	Public Service Broadcasting	Bright Magic		PIAS	
September 24	Ringo Starr	Change the World		Universal Music Enterprises	
September 24	Rivers of Nihil	The Work	Extreme metal, progressive death metal	Metal Blade	
September 24	Skepticism	Companion		Svart	
September 24	Sleep Token	This Place Will Become Your Tomb		Spinefarm	
September 24	Sufjan Stevens and Angelo De Augustine	A Beginner's Mind	Indie folk, chamber folk	Asthmatic Kitty	
September 24	Third Eye Blind	Our Bande Apart		Mega Collider Records	
September 24	Tremonti	Marching in Time	Thrash metal, alternative metal, hard rock	Napalm	
September 24	Various artists	I'll Be Your Mirror: A Tribute to The Velvet Underground & Nico		UMG, Verve	
September 24	Westside Gunn	Hitler Wears Hermes 8: Sincerely Adolf Side B			
September 24	X Ambassadors	The Beautiful Liar		Kidinakorner, Interscope, Polydor	
September 24	YoungBoy Never Broke Again	Sincerely, Kentrell	Hip-hop	Never Broke Again, Atlantic	
September 25	Christine and the Queens	Joseph		Because Music	
September 27	AB6IX	Mo' Complete		Brand New	
September 29	Chō Tokimeki Sendenbu	Suki Suki Suki Suki Suki Suki!		Avex	
September 29	Mary's Blood	Mary's Blood		Tokuma Japan	
September 29	Okamoto's	Kno Where		Ariola Japan	
September 30	Lady Gaga and Tony Bennett	Love for Sale	Jazz	Streamline, Columbia, Interscope	

== Fourth quarter ==
=== October ===
List of albums released in October 2021
Go to: July | August | September | October | November | December | Back to top
Release date	Artist	Album	Genre	Label	Ref.
October 1	Asking Alexandria	See What's on the Inside	Hard rock	Better Noise	
October 1	Asleep at the Wheel	Half a Hundred Years	Country, Western swing	Home Records, Thirty Tigers	
October 1	Black Dice	Mod Prog Sic		FourFour Records	
October 1	The Body and Big Brave	Leaving None but Small Birds		Thrill Jockey	
October 1	Boy Scouts	Wayfinder		Anti-	
October 1	Brandi Carlile	In These Silent Days	Americana, country, folk	Low Country, Elektra	
October 1	The Doobie Brothers	Liberté	Pop rock	Island	
October 1	Explosions in the Sky	Big Bend (An Original Soundtrack for Public Television)			
October 1	Felix Jaehn	Breathe		Virgin	
October 1	Full of Hell	Garden of Burning Apparitions	Grindcore, death metal, noise rock	Relapse	
October 1	Grateful Dead	Fox Theatre, St. Louis, MO 12-10-71	Psychedelic rock	Rhino	
October 1	Headie One	Too Loyal... For My Own Good			
October 1	Heiress	Distant Fires		Satanik Royalty Records	
October 1	Hovvdy	True Love	Indie rock, indie pop	Grand Jury Music	
October 1	Illuminati Hotties	Let Me Do One More	Indie rock, punk rock	Snack Shack Tracks	
October 1	JoJo	Trying Not to Think About It		Warner, Clover Music	
October 1	Kedr Livanskiy	Liminal Soul		2MR	
October 1	KK's Priest	Sermons of the Sinner	Heavy metal	EX1 Records, Cleopatra	
October 1	Lil Wayne and Rich the Kid	Trust Fund Babies	Hip-hop	Young Money, Republic	
October 1	Meek Mill	Expensive Pain		Atlantic, Maybach Music	
October 1	Ministry	Moral Hygiene	Industrial metal	Nuclear Blast	
October 1	Neil Young	Carnegie Hall 1970		Shakey Pictures Records, Reprise	
October 1	Pocket Palma	Atomi	Retrowave	Aquarius	
October 1	Pond	9	Psychedelic rock	Spinning Top Records	
October 1	Princess Century	Surrender			
October 1	Ray BLK	Access Denied	Hip-hop, Afropop	Island	
October 1	The Script	Tales from the Script: Greatest Hits		Phonogenic, Sony Music	
October 1	Shad	Tao		Secret City	
October 1	Strand of Oaks	In Heaven			
October 1	Sylvan Esso	Soundtrack for MASS MoCA			
October 1	The The	The Comeback Special		earMUSIC	
October 1	Tirzah	Colourgrade	Experimental pop, alternative R&B, ambient pop	Domino	
October 1	Wage War	Manic	Metalcore, hard rock	Fearless	
October 1	Wiki	Half God	Hip-hop	Wikset Enterprise	
October 1	Yes	The Quest	Progressive rock	Inside Out, Sony Music	
October 4	Lute	Gold Mouf		Dreamville	
October 5	Aespa	Savage	Pop, electropop, hyperpop	SM	
October 6	Glaive and Ericdoa	Then I'll Be Happy		Interscope	
October 7	BGYO	The Light	Hip-hop, R&B, Synth-pop	Star	
October 8	AJ Mitchell	Skyview		Epic	
October 8	The Alchemist	This Thing of Ours 2		Alc Records	
October 8	Atmosphere	Word?		Rhymesayers	
October 8	BadBadNotGood	Talk Memory		XL, Innovative Leisure	
October 8	bbno$	Eat Ya Veggies		bbno$	
October 8	Billy Bragg	The Million Things That Never Happened	Alternative rock, folk, Americana	Cooking Vinyl	
October 8	Carolyn Wonderland	Tempting Fate		Alligator	
October 8	Don Toliver	Life of a Don	Hip-hop, R&B	Cactus Jack, Atlantic	
October 8	Efterklang	Windflowers			
October 8	Gus G	Quantum Leap		AFM	
October 8	James Blake	Friends That Break Your Heart		Republic, Polydor	
October 8	Jerusalem in My Heart	Qalaq		Constellation	
October 8	John Coltrane	A Love Supreme: Live in Seattle		Impulse!, UMe	
October 8	Lala Lala	I Want the Door to Open		Hardly Art	
October 8	Madonna	Madame X – Music from the Theater Xperience		Warner	
October 8	Magdalena Bay	Mercurial World	Synth-pop, electronic pop	Luminelle Recordings	
October 8	Matt Maltese	Good Morning It's Now Tomorrow		Nettwerk	
October 8	Natalie Hemby	Pins and Needles		Fantasy	
October 8	Nick Zanca	Cacerolazo		Full Spectrum Records	
October 8	Noah Gundersen	A Pillar of Salt		Cooking Vinyl	
October 8	Old Dominion	Time, Tequila & Therapy	Country	RCA Nashville	
October 8	Porches	All Day Gentle Hold !		Domino	
October 8	The Record Company	Play Loud		Concord	
October 8	Sam Fender	Seventeen Going Under	Indie rock, heartland rock, Americana	Polydor	
October 8	Sam Teskey	Cycles			
October 8	Shannon Lay	Geist		Sub Pop	
October 8	Susana Baca	Palabras Urgentes		Real World	
October 8	Tech N9ne	Asin9ne	Hip-hop	Strange Music	
October 8	Trivium	In the Court of the Dragon	Thrash metal, progressive metal, heavy metal	Roadrunner	
October 8	Upsahl	Lady Jesus		Arista	
October 8	The Velveteers	Nightmare Daydream		Easy Eye Sound	
October 8	The World Is a Beautiful Place & I Am No Longer Afraid to Die	Illusory Walls	Post-rock, emo, progressive rock	Epitaph	
October 12	Lil Ugly Mane	Volcanic Bird Enemy and the Voiced Concern			
October 13	Jordana with TV Girl	Summer's Over		Grand Jury	
October 13	Knocked Loose	A Tear in the Fabric of Life	Metalcore, hardcore punk, death metal		
October 13	Pasocom Music Club	See-Voice			
October 14	Bini	Born to Win	Pop, EDM, hip-hop	Star	
October 14	Lovejoy	Pebble Brain	Indie rock, pop-punk	Anvil Cat Records	
October 15	Alice Caymmi	Imaculada	Pop, alternative pop	Rainha dos Raios, Brabo Music	
October 15	Baker Boy	Gela		Island Australia, Universal Australia	
October 15	The Charlatans	A Head Full of Ideas			
October 15	Cœur de pirate	Impossible à aimer	Pop	Bravo Musique	
October 15	Coldplay	Music of the Spheres	Pop, pop rock, space rock	Parlophone	
October 15	Dark Mark vs. Skeleton Joe (Mark Lanegan and Joe Cardamone)	Dark Mark vs. Skeleton Joe		Rare Bird, Kitten Robot	
October 15	The Darkness	Motorheart	Hard rock, glam rock	Cooking Vinyl	
October 15	Dean Wareham	I Have Nothing to Say to the Mayor of L.A.		Double Feature Records	
October 15	Disclosure	DJ-Kicks: Disclosure		Studio !K7	
October 15	Dos Santos	City of Mirrors		International Anthem	
October 15	Finneas	Optimist	Alternative pop	OYOY, Interscope	
October 15	Fluxion	Parallel Moves		Vibrant Music	
October 15	Frank Carter and the Rattlesnakes	Sticky	Punk rock	International Death Cult	
October 15	Fred Frith Trio	Road	Experimental, free improvisation	Intakt	
October 15	Gemini Syndrome	3rd Degree – The Raising		Century Media	
October 15	Glok	Pattern Recognition		Bytes	
October 15	Hania Rani and Dobrawa Czocher	Inner Symphonies		Deutsche Grammophon	
October 15	Hate	Rugia		Metal Blade	
October 15	Hayden Thorpe	Moondust for My Diamond	Electronic, synth-pop	Domino	
October 15	Ice Nine Kills	The Silver Scream 2: Welcome to Horrorwood	Metalcore, deathcore, emo pop	Fearless	
October 15	Jason Isbell & the 400 Unit	Georgia Blue		Southeastern Records	
October 15	Joy Crookes	Skin	Soul jazz, R&B, neo soul	Insanity Records	
October 15	Kacy Hill	Simple, Sweet, and Smiling	Indie pop		
October 15	Kelly Clarkson	When Christmas Comes Around...	Christmas	Atlantic	
October 15	Lilly Hiatt	Lately			
October 15	The Lucid	The Lucid	Hard rock, alternative rock	SpoilerHead Records	
October 15	Melvins	Five Legged Dog		Ipecac	
October 15	Norah Jones	I Dream of Christmas	Christmas	Blue Note	
October 15	PinkPantheress	To Hell with It	Dance-pop, liquid drum and bass, UK garage	Parlophone	
October 15	Pokey LaFarge	In the Blossom of Their Shade		New West	
October 15	Remi Wolf	Juno		Island	
October 15	Santana	Blessings and Miracles	Latin rock	BMG Rights Management	
October 15	Tom Morello	The Atlas Underground Fire		Mom + Pop	
October 15	Twelve Foot Ninja	Vengeance		Volkanik Music	
October 15	Toby Keith	Peso in My Pocket	Country	Show Dog LLC, Thirty Tigers	
October 15	Vanishing Twin	Ookii Gekko		Fire	
October 15	Vildhjarta	Måsstaden under vatten		Century Media	
October 15	We Are Messengers	Wholehearted	CCM, worship	Word Entertainment	
October 15	Xenia Rubinos	Una Rosa		Anti-	
October 15	Young Thug	Punk		YSL, 300, Atlantic	
October 15	Zac Brown Band	The Comeback	Country	Warner Music Nashville, Home Grown Music	
October 15	Zack Fox	Shut the Fuck Up Talking to Me			
October 15	Zack Tabudlo	Episode	Pop, OPM	Island, MCA Music	
October 18	Maxo Kream	Weight of the World		Big Persona, 88 Classic, RCA	
October 20	CL	Alpha		Very Cherry, Sony Music	
October 20	The Peggies	The Garden		Epic Japan	
October 21	Francisco, el Hombre	Casa Francisco	Latin music, MPB, punk rock	ONErpm	
October 22	Agnes	Magic Still Exists		Universal	
October 22	Angel Dust	Yak: A Collection of Truck Songs		Roadrunner	
October 22	Bedouine	Waysides		The Orchard	
October 22	Biffy Clyro	The Myth of the Happily Ever After	Alternative rock, progressive rock, experimental rock	Warner, 14th Floor	
October 22	Black Marble	Fast Idol		Sacred Bones	
October 22	Can't Swim	Change of Plans		Pure Noise	
October 22	Circa Survive	A Dream About Love		Rise	
October 22	Circuit Des Yeux	-io		Matador	
October 22	Clinic	Fantasy Island		Domino	
October 22	Comethazine	Comethazine the Album		Alamo	
October 22	Cradle of Filth	Existence Is Futile	Extreme metal	Nuclear Blast	
October 22	Dave Hause	Blood Harmony			
October 22	Deerhoof	Actually, You Can		Joyful Noise	
October 22	Demarco	Melody		Ineffable Records	
October 22	Don Broco	Amazing Things		SharpTone	
October 22	Dream Theater	A View from the Top of the World	Progressive metal	Inside Out	
October 22	Dua Saleh	Crossover		Against Giants	
October 22	Duran Duran	Future Past	Synth-pop, art pop	BMG	
October 22	Elton John	The Lockdown Sessions		EMI, Mercury	
October 22	Every Time I Die	Radical		Epitaph	
October 22	Fetty Wap	The Butterfly Effect		300, RGF Productions	
October 22	Fuel	Anomaly		Moon Chair Media, ONErpm	
October 22	Good Morning	Barnyard		Good Morning Music Company Worldwide, Polyvinyl	
October 22	Grouper	Shade	Ambient, dream pop	Kranky	
October 22	Guided by Voices	It's Not Them. It Couldn't Be Them. It Is Them!		GBV Inc Records	
October 22	Hand Habits	Fun House		Saddle Creek	
October 22	Helado Negro	Far In		4AD	
October 22	Herbert	Musca		Accidental	
October 22	Honne	Let's Just Say the World Ended a Week From Now, What Would You Do?			
October 22	Jarvis Cocker	Chansons d'Ennui Tip-Top	Chanson, French pop	ABKCO	
October 22	Jessica Pavone	Lull		Chaikin Records	
October 22	JPEGMafia	LP!	Avant-garde rap	Republic, EQT Recordings	
October 22	Kraus	View No Country		Terrible	
October 22	La Luz	La Luz		Hardly Art	
October 22	Lana Del Rey	Blue Banisters	Folk, pop, jazz	Interscope	
October 22	Majid Jordan	Wildest Dreams		OVO	
October 22	Massacre	Resurgence		Nuclear Blast	
October 22	Mod Con	Modern Condition		Poison City	
October 22	Ms Banks	Bank Statement			
October 22	My Morning Jacket	My Morning Jacket	Psychedelic rock, roots rock	ATO	
October 22	Nick Cave and the Bad Seeds	B-Sides & Rarities Part II		Mute	
October 22	Nubya Garcia	Source ⧺ We Move			
October 22	Okay Kaya	The Incompatible Okay Kaya		Jagjaguwar	
October 22	Oscar and the Wolf	The Shimmer		PIAS	
October 22	Parannoul / Asian Glow / sonhos tomam conta	Downfall of the Neon Youth	Shoegaze	Longinus Recording	
October 22	Parquet Courts	Sympathy for Life	Garage rock, dance-punk, post-punk	Rough Trade	
October 22	Phew	New Decade		Mute	
October 22	The Pineapple Thief	Nothing but the Truth		Kscope	
October 22	Ross from Friends	Tread		Brainfeeder	
October 22	Rüfüs Du Sol	Surrender		Rose Avenue, Reprise, Warner Australia	
October 22	Self Esteem	Prioritise Pleasure	Pop	Fiction	
October 22	Seventeen	Attacca	K-pop	Pledis	
October 22	Starset	Horizons	Hard rock, alternative metal	Fearless	
October 22	Together Pangea	Dye			
October 22	Tonstartssbandht	Petunia		Mexican Summer	
October 22	Trace Mountains	House of Confusion		Lame-O Records	
October 22	Tricky	Lonely Guest		False Idols	
October 22	U.D.O.	Game Over		AFM	
October 22	Wale	Folarin II	Hip-hop	Maybach, Warner	
October 22	Wet	Letter Blue		AWAL	
October 22	Yung Raja	Mike		Def Jam	
October 26	Amerado	Patience			
October 27	Ailee	Amy		The L1ve	
October 27	Kyary Pamyu Pamyu	Candy Racer		Nippon Columbia	
October 28	Grant Kirkhope	Banjo Kazooie: Re-Jiggyed			
October 28	Lili	Sunchild		Sony Music Philippines	
October 28	Namasenda	Unlimited Ammo		PC Music	
October 28	Park Ji-hoon	Hot&Cold		Maroo	
October 29	Alina Baraz	Moongate		Memo Blue, United Masters	
October 29	Archspire	Bleed the Future	Technical death metal	Season of Mist	
October 29	Attack Attack!	Long Time, No Sea		Oxide Records	
October 29	Bad Wolves	Dear Monsters		Better Noise	
October 29	Bat Fangs	Queen of My World		Don Giovanni	
October 29	Beast in Black	Dark Connection	Power metal, heavy metal	Nuclear Blast	
October 29	Be'lakor	Coherence	Melodic death metal	Napalm	
October 29	Big Sean and Hit-Boy	What You Expect		FF to Def Entertainment, Def Jam	
October 29	Boston Manor	Desperate Times Desperate Pleasures		SharpTone	
October 29	Black Veil Brides	The Phantom Tomorrow	Hard rock, gothic metal	Sumerian	
October 29	Charlotte Cornfield	Highs in the Minuses		Next Door Records	
October 29	Dami Im	My Reality		ABC Music	
October 29	Dinosaur Jr.	Emptiness at the Sinclair		Jagjaguwar	
October 29	Ed Sheeran	=	Pop	Asylum, Atlantic	
October 29	Geese	Projector	Post-punk	Partisan, PIAS	
October 29	Ghost Bath	Self Loather		Nuclear Blast	
October 29	Helheim	Woduridar		Dark Essence Records	
October 29	Jerry Cantrell	Brighten	Alternative rock, country rock		
October 29	Jeon Somi	XOXO		The Black Label	
October 29	Joe Bonamassa	Time Clocks	Blues rock	J&R Adventures, Provogue	
October 29	John 5	Sinner		Big Machine	
October 29	Johnny Cash	Bear's Sonic Journals: At the Carousel Ballroom, April 24, 1968	Country	Owsley Stanley Foundation, Renew Records, BMG	
October 29	Kayo Dot	Moss Grew on the Swords and Plowshares Alike		Prophecy Productions	
October 29	Lone	Always Inside Your Head		Greco-Roman	
October 29	Lotic	Water		Houndstooth Records	
October 29	Lucifer	Lucifer IV			
October 29	Marissa Nadler	The Path of the Clouds		Sacred Bones, Bella Union	
October 29	Mastodon	Hushed and Grim		Reprise	
October 29	Megan Thee Stallion	Something for Thee Hotties		1501 Certified, 300	
October 29	Our Lady Peace	Spiritual Machines 2	Alternative rock, art rock	Shelter Music Group (BMG)	
October 29	Reason	No More, No Less: Demo 1		TDE	
October 29	ROMderful	Please Reconnect Controller		EMA, The Orchard	
October 29	Running Wild	Blood on Blood		Steamhammer	
October 29	Sam Evian	Time to Melt		Fat Possum	
October 29	Save Face	Another Kill for the Highlight Reel		Epitaph	
October 29	Susto	Time in the Sun		New West	
October 29	Theon Cross	Intra-I		New Soil	
October 29	Tori Amos	Ocean to Ocean	Alternative rock, chamber pop, pop rock	Decca	
October 29	The War on Drugs	I Don't Live Here Anymore		Atlantic	
October 29	Wave Racer	To Stop from Falling Off the Earth		PIAS	
October 29	Whitechapel	Kin		Metal Blade	
October 30	Jónsi	Obsidian		Krunk	
October 31	Insane Clown Posse	Yum Yum Bedlam	Horrorcore, rap rock	Psychopathic	
October 31	Limp Bizkit	Still Sucks	Nu metal, rap rock, alternative metal	Suretone	

=== November ===
List of albums released in November 2021
Go to: July | August | September | October | November | December | Back to top
Release date	Artist	Album	Genre	Label	Ref.
November 1	2AM	Ballad 21 F/W			
November 1	Im Chang-jung	Nothing Special with the Day			
November 2	Diablo Swing Orchestra	Swagger & Stroll Down the Rabbit Hole	Avant-garde metal	Candlelight	
November 2	Super Junior-D&E	Countdown	Hip house, hip-hop, pop rock	SM	
November 3	Laboum	Blossom	K-pop	Interpark Music Plus	
November 4	Duda Brack	Caco de Vidro	Pop, cumbia, folk	Matogrosso, Alá Comunicação e Cultura, Altafonte	
November 5	ABBA	Voyage	Disco, pop, synth-pop	Polar, Universal	
November 5	Aimee Mann	Queens of the Summer Hotel	Folk	SuperEgo	
November 5	Barry Adamson	Steal Away		Mute	
November 5	Bent Knee	Frosting		Take This to Heart Records	
November 5	Bullet for My Valentine	Bullet for My Valentine	Melodic metalcore, thrash metal, heavy metal	Spinefarm	
November 5	Colin James	Open Road		Stony Plain	
November 5	Connan Mockasin	Jassbusters Two			
November 5	Crazy Lixx	Street Lethal		Frontiers	
November 5	Curtis Harding	If Words Were Flowers			
November 5	Diana Ross	Thank You		Decca	
November 5	Dijon	Absolutely	R&B	R&R, Warner	
November 5	Dion	Stomping Ground		Keeping the Blues Alive Records	
November 5	DJ Lag	Meeting With the King		Black Major	
November 5	Emigrate	The Persistence of Memory	Alternative rock, industrial rock, pop metal	Sony Music	
November 5	Emma Ruth Rundle	Engine of Hell	Alternative rock, indie folk	Sargent House	
November 5	Finn Askew	Tokyo		Capitol	
November 5	Gold & Youth	Dream Baby		Paper Bag	
November 5	Gregory Porter	Still Rising		Decca, Blue Note	
November 5	HalfNoise	Motif		Congrats Records	
November 5	Hana Vu	Public Storage		Ghostly International	
November 5	Heart Attack Man	Thoughtz & Prayerz		Triple Crown	
November 5	The Horrors	Against the Blade			
November 5	Hyd	Hyd		PC Music	
November 5	James Arthur	It'll All Make Sense in the End		Columbia	
November 5	J. D. Simo	Mind Control		Crows Feet Records	
November 5	J. D. Wilkes and the Legendary Shack Shakers	Cockadoodledeux		Alternative Tentacles	
November 5	Jennifer O'Connor	Born at the Disco		Kiam Records	
November 5	Joan As Police Woman	The Solution Is Restless		PIAS	
November 5	John DeNicola	She Said			
November 5	Katy B	Peace and Offerings	R&B, neo soul	Rinse	
November 5	Key Glock	Yellow Tape 2	Hip-hop	Paper Route Empire	
November 5	Kito	Blossom		Astralwerks	
November 5	Lauren Jauregui	Prelude		Attunement Records	
November 5	Margo Cilker	Pohorylle	Americana	Fluff & Gravy	
November 5	Nashville Pussy	Eaten Alive		Slinging Pig Records, MVD	
November 5	Nathaniel Rateliff and the Night Sweats	The Future	Soul, rock, blues	Stax	
November 5	Nation of Language	A Way Forward	Synth-pop, post-punk	PIAS	
November 5	Parcels	Day/Night		Because	
November 5	Portico Quartet	Monument		Gondwana	
November 5	Portrayal of Guilt	Christfucker		Run for Cover	
November 5	Radiohead	Kid Amnesiae		XL	
November 5	Richard Fearless	Future Rave Memory			
November 5	SeeYouSpaceCowboy	The Romance of Affliction		Pure Noise	
November 5	Serpentwithfeet	Deacon's Grove		Secretly Canadian	
November 5	Snail Mail	Valentine	Indie rock	Matador	
November 5	Starlite Campbell Band	The Language of Curiosity		Supertone	
November 5	The Steel Wheels	Everyone a Song, Vol. 2			
November 5	Steffany Gretzinger	Faith of My Father	Contemporary worship music	TIM Records	
November 5	Steve Conte	Bronx Cheer		Wicked Cool	
November 5	Steve Perry	The Season	Christmas	Fantasy	
November 5	Summer Walker	Still Over It	R&B	Love Renaissance, Interscope	
November 5	Tasha	Tell Me What You Miss the Most		Father/Daughter	
November 5	Tusks	Change		One Little Independent	
November 5	The Verve Pipe	Threads			
November 9	Oneus	Blood Moon	K-pop	RBW	
November 10	Empire	Bright Future	J-pop	WACK, Avex Trax	
November 10	Tomorrow X Together	Chaotic Wonderland	Pop rock	Big Hit, Republic	
November 11	B.I	Cosmos		IOK M	
November 12	Aesop Rock and Blockhead	Garbology	Hip-hop	Rhymesayers	
November 12	All Hail the Yeti	Within the Hollow Earth		Minus Head Records	
November 12	Courtney Barnett	Things Take Time, Take Time	Indie rock	Milk!	
November 12	Damon Albarn	The Nearer the Fountain, More Pure the Stream Flows		Transgressive	
November 12	Dave Gahan and Soulsavers	Imposter	Pop rock	Columbia	
November 12	Duval Timothy and Rosie Lowe	Son		Carrying Colour	
November 12	Enuff Z'Nuff	Hardrock Nite		Frontiers	
November 12	Eric Clapton	The Lady in the Balcony: Lockdown Sessions			
November 12	Flight Facilities	Forever		Future Classic	
November 12	Gov't Mule	Heavy Load Blues	Blues	Fantasy	
November 12	Gracie Abrams	This Is What It Feels Like	Bedroom pop	Interscope	
November 12	Holly Humberstone	The Walls Are Way Too Thin		Polydor, Darkroom, Interscope	
November 12	Idles	Crawler	Hardcore punk, noise rock, post-punk	Partisan	
November 12	Irreversible Entanglements	Open the Gates	Free jazz, funk, post-punk	Don Giovanni, International Anthem	
November 12	Jade Eagleson	Honkytonk Revival	Neotraditional country	Starseed Records	
November 12	Jane Remover	Frailty		DeadAir	
November 12	Jason Aldean	Macon	Country, country rock	Broken Bow	
November 12	Jon Hopkins	Music for Psychedelic Therapy	Electronic, ambient	Domino	
November 12	L.A. Guns	Checkered Past		Frontiers	
November 12	Little Mix	Between Us	Dance-pop, R&B	RCA UK	
November 12	Rise Against	Nowhere Sessions			
November 12	Rod Stewart	The Tears of Hercules		Warner, Rhino	
November 12	Sega Bodega	Romeo		NUXXE	
November 12	Show-Ya	Showdown		Metalville Records	
November 12	Silent Planet	Iridescent		Solid State, UNFD	
November 12	Silk Sonic	An Evening with Silk Sonic		Aftermath, Atlantic	
November 12	Taylor Swift	Red (Taylor's Version)	Arena rock, country pop, pop rock	Republic	
November 12	They Might Be Giants	Book	Alternative rock	Idlewild Recordings	
November 12	Twice	Formula of Love: O+T=<3	K-pop	JYP, Republic	
November 12	Unleashed	No Sign of Life	Death metal	Napalm	
November 12	Walk the Moon	Heights	Pop rock, alternative pop	RCA	
November 12	The Wanted	Most Wanted: The Greatest Hits		Island	
November 12	Yoasobi	E-Side	J-pop	Sony Music Japan	
November 19	Adele	30	Pop, soul, jazz	Columbia	
November 19	Angel Haze	Girl with a Gun		Long Flight Home	
November 19	Body/Dilloway/Head (Body/Head and Aaron Dilloway)	Body/Dilloway/Head		Three Lobed Recordings	
November 19	Brian Wilson	At My Piano	Easy listening	Decca	
November 19	Chris Liebing	Another Day		Mute	
November 19	Converge & Chelsea Wolfe	Bloodmoon: I		Epitaph	
November 19	Deap Vally	Marriage	Indie rock, rock	Cooking Vinyl	
November 19	Elbow	Flying Dream 1		Polydor	
November 19	Exodus	Persona Non Grata	Thrash metal	Nuclear Blast	
November 19	Fred Again	Actual Life 2 (February 2 – October 15 2021)	Electronic	Again.. Records	
November 19	James Blunt	The Stars Beneath My Feet (2004–2021)		Atlantic	
November 19	Jessy Lanza	DJ-Kicks: Jessy Lanza		!K7	
November 19	Kaytranada	Intimidated			
November 19	Khemmis	Deceiver		20 Buck Spin, Nuclear Blast	
November 19	Klein	Harmattan		Pentatone	
November 19	Ladyhawke	Time Flies		BMG	
November 19	Makaya McCraven	Deciphering the Message	Jazz	Blue Note	
November 19	Mayday Parade	What It Means to Fall Apart	Pop-punk, emo	Rise	
November 19	Me and that Man	New Man, New Songs, Same Shit, Vol. 2		Napalm	
November 19	Monsta X	No Limit	K-pop	Starship	
November 19	Mr Twin Sister	Al Mundo Azul			
November 19	Ovlov	Buds	Indie rock	Exploding in Sound	
November 19	Paul Kelly	Paul Kelly's Christmas Train	Christmas		
November 19	Peter Capaldi	St Christopher			
November 19	Rezz	Spiral	Electronic	RCA	
November 19	Robert Plant and Alison Krauss	Raise the Roof	Americana	Rounder, Concord	
November 19	Scowl	How Flowers Grow	Hardcore punk	Flatspot Records	
November 19	Snoop Dogg	The Algorithm	West Coast hip-hop, R&B, gangsta rap	Def Jam	
November 19	Theatres des Vampires	In Nomine Sanguinis		Scarlet	
November 19	Twenty One Pilots	Scaled and Icy (Livestream Version)		Fueled by Ramen	
November 19	Willie Nelson	The Willie Nelson Family	Country	Legacy	
November 23	Radwimps	Forever Daze	Alternative rock	EMI	
November 24	Aina the End	The Zombie		Avex Trax	
November 24	NiziU	U	J-pop	JYP, Epic Japan	
November 25	Ghost9	Now: Who We Are Facing		Maroo	
November 26	Alan Walker	World of Walker		MER, Sony	
November 26	Black Label Society	Doom Crew Inc.	Heavy metal, Southern metal, hard rock	eOne	
November 26	Christian McBride	Live at the Village Vanguard	Jazz	Mack Avenue	
November 26	Cynic	Ascension Codes		Season of Mist	
November 26	Dan Sartain	Arise, Dan Sartain, Arise		One Little Independent	
November 26	David Bowie	Toy		ISO, Parlophone	
November 26	Deep Purple	Turning to Crime	Blues rock, hard rock	earMusic	
November 26	Hypocrisy	Worship	Melodic death metal	Nuclear Blast	
November 26	Imminence	Heaven in Hiding	Metalcore	Arising Empire	
November 26	Lordi	Lordiversity		AFM	
November 26	Richard Dawson and Circle	Henki		Weird World	
November 26	Rufus Wainwright and Amsterdam Sinfonietta	Rufus Wainwright and Amsterdam Sinfonietta Live		BMG, Modern Recordings	
November 26	Sunn O)))	Metta, Benevolence. BBC 6Music: Live on the Invitation of Mary Anne Hobbs		Southern Lord	
November 26	Westlife	Wild Dreams	Pop, electropop	Warner Music UK	
November 30	Arca	Kick II		XL	

=== December ===
List of albums released in December 2021
Go to: July | August | September | October | November | December | Back to top
Release date	Artist	Album	Genre	Label	Ref.
December 1	Arca	Kick III		XL	
December 1	Dillom	Post Mortem		Bohemian Groove	
December 1	Yoasobi	The Book 2	J-pop	Sony Music Japan	
December 2	Arca	Kick IIII		XL	
December 3	Angèle	Nonante-Cinq	Dance-pop, disco-pop, synth-pop	Angèle VL Records, Initial Artist Services	
December 3	Arca	Kick IIIII		XL	
December 3	Devin Townsend	The Puzzle	Ambient, experimental		
December 3	Devin Townsend	Snuggles	Ambient, experimental		
December 3	Khalid	Scenic Drive	R&B, hip-hop soul	RCA	
December 3	LP	Churches	Pop, rock, indie rock	SOTA Records, Dine Alone Music	
December 3	Marissa Paternoster	Peace Meter		Don Giovanni	
December 3	ONF	Goosebumps		WM	
December 3	Nardo Wick	Who Is Nardo Wick?	Trap	Flawless Entertainment, RCA	
December 3	Of Mice & Men	Echo	Metalcore	SharpTone	
December 3	Paul Weller with Jules Buckley & the BBC Symphony Orchestra	An Orchestrated Songbook			
December 3	Polo G	Hall of Fame 2.0		Columbia	
December 3	The Teskey Brothers with Orchestra Victoria	Live at Hamer Hall		Ivy League	
December 3	Volbeat	Servant of the Mind		Vertigo, Republic, Universal	
December 7	Mino	To Infinity.		YG	
December 9	Bad Gyal	Sound System: The Final Releases		Universal Music Latino, Interscope	
December 10	Alicia Keys	Keys		RCA	
December 10	Bonnie "Prince" Billy and Bill Callahan	Blind Date Party	Folk, country, rock	Drag City	
December 10	Birdman and YoungBoy Never Broke Again	From the Bayou		Atlantic, Cash Money, Republic	
December 10	Dead Best (Adam Goren and Brian Sokel)	Dead Best		Don Giovanni	
December 10	Eskimo Joe	The World Repeats Itself Somehow		Warner	
December 10	Green Day	The BBC Sessions		Reprise	
December 10	Jlin	Embryo		Planet Mu	
December 10	Juice Wrld	Fighting Demons	Hip-hop, emo rap	Interscope	
December 10	Marie Osmond	Unexpected			
December 10	Monsta X	The Dreaming	Pop	Intertwine	
December 10	Moses Sumney	Live from Blackalachia			
December 10	Neil Young and Crazy Horse	Barn	Rock	Reprise	
December 10	Rick Ross	Richer Than I Ever Been		Maybach, Epic	
December 10	Tory Lanez	Alone at Prom	Synth-pop, R&B	One Umbrella	
December 14	NCT	Universe	Hip-hop, R&B, EDM	SM	
December 15	Nemophila	Revive		Master Works	
December 15	Nogizaka46	Time Flies	J-pop	N46Div., Sony Music Japan	
December 15	Tricot	Jodeki			
December 17	Hed PE	Califas Worldwide		Suburban Noize	
December 17	Nick Cave and Warren Ellis	La Panthére Des Neiges		Invada Records, Lakeshore	
December 17	Roddy Ricch	Live Life Fast	Hip-hop	Atlantic	
December 22	Itzy	It'z Itzy		Warner Music Japan	
December 22	Piggs	Juicyy		PourPourLand	
December 24	Nas	Magic	Hip-hop, hardcore hip-hop	Mass Appeal	
December 27	Kim Jae-hwan	The Letter		Swing	
