= American Dreamer (album) =

Box set by Laura Nyro
- Released: September 3, 2021
- Recorded: 1960s and 1970s
- Studio: Various studios in the United States
- Language: English
- Label: Madfish
- Producer: James Batsford; Charlie Calello; Felix Cavaliere; Kenny Gamble; Roscoe Harring; Leon Huff; Arif Mardin; Roy Halee; Milton Okun; Laura Nyro

Laura Nyro chronology
A Little Magic, A Little Kindness: The Complete Mono Albums Collection (2017)	American Dreamer (2021)

American Dreamer is a 2021 box set of reissues from American singer-songwriter Laura Nyro released by Madfish. It has received positive critical reception.

== Reception ==
According to the review aggregator Metacritic, American Dreamer received "universal acclaim" based on a weighted average score of 99 out of 100 from four critic scores. Sam Sodomsky of Pitchfork Media rated this collection an 8.8 out of 10 for Nyro's "obvious, prodigious talent", with the publication declaring this "Best New Reissue". For Under the Radar, Hays Davis rated this album an 8.5 out of 10 for Nyro's importance in pop music history and her ability to move "comfortably between various musical styles". In Uncut, Laura Barton gave the set five out of five stars, due to the "sheer heft of her talent" displayed on the music. Record Collector's Charles Waring issued the same score and noted the artist's influence and breadth as a songwriter, as well as the value of the bonus tracks for collectors.

== Track listing ==
All songs written by Laura Nyro, except where noted

More Than a New Discovery

1. "Goodbye Joe" – 2:38
2. "Billy's Blues" – 3:20
3. "And When I Die" – 2:40
4. "Stoney End" – 2:46
5. "Lazy Susan" – 3:53
6. "Flim Flam Man" – 2:29
7. "Wedding Bell Blues" – 2:44
8. "Buy and Sell" – 3:38
9. "He's a Runner" – 3:40
10. "Blowin' Away" – 2:23
11. "I Never Meant to Hurt You" – 2:52
12. "California Shoeshine Boys" – 2:45

Eli and the Thirteenth Confession

1. "Luckie" – 3:00
2. "Lu" – 2:44
3. "Sweet Blindness" – 2:37
4. "Poverty Train" – 4:16
5. "Lonely Women" – 3:32
6. "Eli's Comin'" – 3:58
7. "Timer" – 3:22
8. "Stoned Soul Picnic" – 3:47
9. "Emmie" – 4:20
10. "Woman's Blues" – 3:46
11. "Once It Was Alright (Farmer Joe)" – 2:58
12. "December's Boudoir" – 5:05
13. "The Confession" – 2:50

New York Tendaberry

1. "You Don't Love Me When I Cry" – 4:24
2. "Captain for Dark Mornings" – 4:38
3. "Tom Cat Goodbye" – 5:32
4. "Mercy on Broadway" – 2:18
5. "Save the Country" – 4:36
6. "Gibsom Street" – 4:47
7. "Time and Love" – 4:24
8. "The Man Who Sends Me Home" – 2:52
9. "Sweet Lovin' Baby" – 3:55
10. "Captain Saint Lucifer" – 3:17
11. "New York Tendaberry" – 5:33

Christmas and the Beads of Sweat

1. "Brown Earth" – 4:09
2. "When I Was a Freeport and You Were the Main Drag" – 2:42
3. "Blackpatch" – 3:33
4. "Been on a Train" – 5:49
5. "Up on the Roof" (Gerry Goffin, Carole King) – 3:13
6. "Upstairs by a Chinese Lamp" – 5:34
7. "Map to the Treasure" – 8:08
8. "Beads of Sweat" – 4:47
9. "Christmas in My Soul" – 7:00

Gonna Take a Miracle

1. "I Met Him on a Sunday" (Doris Jackson, Addie Harris McPherson, Beverly Lee, Shirley Alston Reeves) – 1:55
2. "The Bells" (Marvin Gaye, Anna Gordy Gaye, Iris Gordy, Elgie Stover) – 2:56
3. "Monkey Time/Dancing in the Street" (Curtis Mayfield, Marvin Gaye, Ivy Jo Hunter, William "Mickey" Stevenson) – 4:57
4. "Désiree" (L.Z. Cooper, Danny Johnson) – 1:52
5. "You've Really Got a Hold on Me" (Smokey Robinson) – 4:07
6. "Spanish Harlem" (Jerry Leiber, Phil Spector) – 2:52
7. "Jimmy Mack" (Holland–Dozier–Holland) – 2:56
8. "The Wind" (Devora Brown, Bob Edwards, Nolan Strong) – 2:58
9. "Nowhere to Run" (Holland–Dozier–Holland) – 5:08
10. "It's Gonna Take a Miracle" (Teddy Randazzo, Bobby Weinstein, Lou Stallman) – 3:24

Smile

1. "Sexy Mama" (Al Goodman, Sylvia Robinson, Harry Ray) – 2:41
2. "Children of the Junks" – 2:49
3. "Money" – 4:59
4. "I Am the Blues" – 5:44
5. "Stormy Love" – 4:29
6. "The Cat Song" – 2:34
7. "Midnite Blue" – 3:05
8. "Smile" – 5:36

Nested

1. "Mr. Blue (Song of Communications)" – 5:01
2. "Rhythm and Blues" – 2:57
3. "My Innocence" – 3:24
4. "Crazy Love" – 4:18
5. "American Dreamer" – 4:08
6. "Springblown" – 4:24
7. "The Sweet Sky" – 3:32
8. "Light" – 2:53
9. "Child in a Universe" – 4:09
10. "The Nest" – 2:27

Rarities and Live Recordings

1. "Stoney End" (Single Version)
2. "Lu" (Demo)
3. "Stoned Soul Picnic" (Demo)
4. "Emmie" (Demo)
5. "Eli's Comin'" (Mono Single Version)
6. "Save the Country" (Single Version)
7. "In the Country Way" (Album Version)
8. "Ain't Nothing Like the Real Thing" (Live at Fillmore East, May 30, 1971)
9. "(You Make Me Feel Like) A Natural Woman" (Goffin and King) (Live at Fillmore East, May 30, 1971)
10. "O-o-h Child" (Stan Vincent) (Live at Fillmore East, May 30, 1971)
11. "Up on the Roof" (Goffin and King) (Live at Fillmore East, May 30, 1971)
12. "Someone Loves You" (Demo)
13. "Get My Cap" (Demo)
14. "Coffee Morning" (Demo)
15. Medley – "Emily" / "Nested" (Live)

== Personnel ==
More Than a New Discovery

- Laura Nyro – guitar, keyboards, vocals
- Jay Berliner – guitar
- Herb Bernstein – arrangement, conducting, flugelhorn
- Stan Free – piano
- Jean Goldhirsch – assistant production
- Bill LaVorgna – drums
- Murray Laden – photography
- Buddy Lucas – harmonica
- Lou Mauro – double bass
- Milton Okun – production
- Jerry Schoenbaum – production supervision
- James Sedlar – French horn
- Val Valentin – director of engineering
- Harry Yarmark – engineering

Eli and the Thirteenth Confession

- Laura Nyro – piano, keyboards, vocal, harmonies
- Chet Amsterdam – acoustic guitar and bass guitar
- Wayne Andre – trombone
- Charlie Calello – arrangement, production
- Pat Calello – trumpet
- Dave Carey – percussion
- Ralph Casale – acoustic guitar
- Bob Cato – photography
- Jimmy Cleveland – trombone
- Ray DeSio – trombone
- Joe Farrell – saxophone, flute
- Bernie Glow – trumpet
- Paul Griffin – piano on "Eli's Comin'" and "Once It Was Alright Now (Farmer Joe)"
- Hugh McCracken – electric guitar
- Chuck Rainey – bass
- Ernie Royal – trumpet
- Buddy Saltzman – drums
- Roy Segal – engineering
- Artie Schroeck – drums, vibraphone
- Zoot Sims – saxophone
- Stan Tonkel – engineering
- George Young – saxophone

New York Tendaberry

- Laura Nyro – piano, vocals, arrangement
- Gary Chester – drums
- Roy Halee – production, engineering
- Jimmie Haskell – conducting, orchestral arrangement
- David Gahr – cover photography
- Mark Wilder – mastering

Christmas and the Beads of Sweat

- Laura Nyro – piano, vocals, arrangements
- Duane Allman – guitar
- Barry Beckett – vibraphone
- Felix Cavaliere – organ, bells, production
- Alice Coltrane – harp
- Dino Danelli – drums
- Richard Davis – double bass
- Cornell Dupree – electric guitar
- Joe Farrell – woodwinds
- Ashod Garabedian – oud
- Tim Geelan – engineer
- Roger Hawkins – drums
- Eddie Hinton – electric guitar
- David Hood – bass guitar
- Jack Jennings – percussion
- Ralph MacDonald – percussion
- Arif Mardin – arrangements, conductor, producer
- Beth O'Brien – cover portrait
- Doug Pomeroy – assistant engineer
- Chuck Rainey – bass guitar
- Stuart Scharf – acoustic guitar
- Roy Segal – engineer
- Jerry Lee Smith – assistant engineer
- Michael Szittai – cimbalom

Gonna Take a Miracle

- Laura Nyro – vocals, piano
- Ronnie Baker – bass guitar
- Thom Bell – string and horn arrangements
- Gary Burden – art direction, design
- Roland Chambers – guitar
- Sarah Dash – vocals
- Tim Geelan – engineering
- Norman Harris – guitar
- Jim Helmer – drums
- Nona Hendryx – vocals
- Patti LaBelle – vocals
- Bobby Martin – string and horn arrangements
- Nydia “Liberty” Mata – congas
- Vincent Montana Jr. – percussion
- Stephen Paley – front cover photography
- Lenny Pakula – organ, string and horn arrangements
- Larry Washington – bongos,

Smile

- Laura Nyro – vocals, piano, guitar, wood block
- Bob Babbitt – bass guitar
- Rubens Bassini – shaker
- Joe Beck – guitar
- Greg Bennett – guitar
- Michael Brecker – saxophone
- Randy Brecker – trumpet
- Carter C. C. Collins – congas
- Richard Davis – bass guitar
- Joe Farrell – saxophone
- David Friedman – vibraphone
- Jerry Friedman – guitar
- Tim Geelan – engineer
- Reiko Kamota – koto
- Ed Lee – artwork
- Will Lee – bass guitar
- Jimmy Maelen – tambourine, wood block
- Rick Marotta – drums
- Nydia Mata – congas
- Hugh McCracken – guitar
- Jay Messina – assistant engineer
- Paul Messing – triangle
- Jeff Mironov – guitar
- Patty Newport – photography
- Chris Parker – drums
- Don Puluse – engineer
- Allan Schwartzberg, – drums
- Stan Tonkel – assistant engineer
- John Tropea – guitar
- Lou Waxman – assistant engineer
- Nisako Yoshida – koto
- George Young – saxophone

Nested

- Laura Nyro – vocals, electric and acoustic piano, church organ, guitar, strings
- Dale Ashby – engineering
- Felix Cavaliere – electric piano on "The Sweet Sky", organ on "The Nest"
- Cyril Cianflone – bass guitar on "Mr. Blue (The Song of Communications)"
- Adger W. Cowans – photography
- Vinnie Cusano – guitar
- Frank Koenig – engineering
- Will Lee – bass guitar
- Tony Levin – bass guitar on "American Dreamer"
- Nydia "Liberty" Mata – percussion
- Andy Newmark – drums
- John Sebastian – harmonica
- John Tropea – guitar

American Dreamer

- James Batsford – reissue production
- Peter Doggett – liner notes

== See also ==
- List of 2021 albums (July–December)
