= Stoney End (Barbra Streisand album) =

Studio album by Barbra Streisand
- Released: February 1971
- Recorded: July–December 1970
- Studio: United (Las Vegas)
- Genre: Pop rock
- Length: 34:50
- Label: Columbia
- Producer: Richard Perry

Barbra Streisand chronology
The Owl and the Pussycat (1970)	Stoney End (1971)	Barbra Joan Streisand (1971)

Singles from Stoney End
- 1. "Stoney End" Released: October 1970; 2. "Time and Love" Released: March 1971; 3. "Flim Flam Man" Released: May 1971

Stoney End is the twelfth studio album by American singer Barbra Streisand. Released in February 1971 and produced by Richard Perry, it was a conscious change in direction for Streisand, having a more upbeat, contemporary pop/rock sound. It included cover versions of several songs by contemporary singer-songwriters, including Laura Nyro, Randy Newman and Joni Mitchell.

The album became one of the most successful of Streisand's career: it was certified platinum by the RIAA for sales exceeding 1 million copies in the United States alone. It also included three hit songs: "Stoney End", "Time and Love" and "Flim Flam Man". They appeared on Billboard magazine's Hot 100 and Adult Contemporary charts. The album peaked at #10 in the United States; it was the first of hers in five years to have reached the top 10.

== Production and release ==
In 1971, after the relative failure in sales of What About Today? Columbia Records continued with the desire to modernize the singer's repertoire, but this time the choice to produce the singer's album was Richard Perry who chose songs by contemporary artists such as: Joni Mitchell, Gordon Lightfoot, Harry Nilsson and Laura Nyro.

The album cover photography was taken at Sunrise Mountain, Nevada by Barry Feinstein. When Columbia promoted the singer's next album Barbra Joan Streisand, it announced in magazines that Stoney End is like the artist's first album, given the large number of people who discover her songs since the record.

The song "Stoney End", composed by Laura Nyro, was released in the US as the lead single and charted at number 6 on the Billboard Hot 100 and number 2 on the Adult Contemporary chart and also reached number 27 on the UK singles chart. "Time and Love" reached Number 51 on the Billboard Hot 100 and number 3 on the AC Chart. "Hands Off the Man", the final single, was officially titled "Flim Flam Man" (and backed with "Maybe"). It spent 5 weeks on the Billboard Hot 100, peaking at 82.

== Critical reception ==
Professional ratings
Review scores
Source	Rating
AllMusic	4.5/5 stars
Rolling Stone	Mixed
Billboard	Favorable

The album received favorable reviews from music critics. William Ruhlmann, from AllMusic website, has retrospectively given the album four and a half (out of five) stars, and called it "not a perfect album, but it was so far removed from what Streisand's fans and her detractors thought her capable of that it stands as one of her major triumphs". The review also mentioned: "whereas (The Barbra Streisand Album, 1963) had redefined the role of the traditional pop singer in contemporary terms for the early '60s, Stoney End redefined Streisand as an effective pop/rock singer".

Alex Dubo from Rolling Stone gave the album a mixed review which he wrote that "Stoney End runs hot and cold. Some of the cuts are really dynamite and some are holdovers from the days of musical comedies". He also wrote that the album "shows that Barbra Streisand can sing, and could be relevant, although I don't expect droves of rock fans to rush out and buy this".

== Commercial performance ==
The album hit number 10 on the Billboard 200, and was certified Platinum with sales of 1 million copies, in 1986. In the UK the album entered the chart at number 28. It also peaked at #12 in Canada. It peaked #62 in the 1971's Year-end chart of the Cash Box magazine.

== Track listing ==
Side One

1. "I Don't Know Where I Stand" (Joni Mitchell)
2. "Hands Off the Man (Flim Flam Man)" (Laura Nyro)
3. "If You Could Read My Mind" (Gordon Lightfoot)
4. "Just a Little Lovin' (Early in the Mornin')" (Barry Mann, Cynthia Weil)
5. "Let Me Go" from the Columbia Pictures release Pursuit of Happiness (Randy Newman)
6. "Stoney End" (Laura Nyro)

Side Two

1. "No Easy Way Down" (Carole King, Gerry Goffin)
2. "Time and Love" (Laura Nyro)
3. "Maybe" (Harry Nilsson)
4. "Free the People" (Barbara Keith)
5. "I'll Be Home" (Randy Newman)

== Charts ==
Chart (1971)	Peak position
US Billboard 200	10
US Cashbox Top Albums	8

== Certifications and sales ==
Region	Certification	Certified units/sales
United States (RIAA)	Platinum	1,000,000^{^}
^{^} Shipments figures based on certification alone.

== Personnel ==
- Barbra Streisand – vocals
- Randy Newman – piano on "Let Me Go" and "I'll Be Home"
- Larry Carlton, David Cohen, June Millington, Louis Shelton, Eric Weissberg – guitar
- Nickey Barclay – keyboards
- Gene Page – arranger
- Hal Blaine, Richie Hayward, Earl Palmer, Ron Tutt – drums
- Max Bennett, Larry Knechtel, Joe Osborn – bass guitar
- Perry Botkin Jr. – arranger
- Claus Ogerman – arranger
- Larry Muhoberac, Michel Rubini – keyboards
- Richard Perry – guitar, percussion
- Milt Holland – percussion
- Jackie Ward – background vocals
- Toni Wine – background vocals
- Jerry Cook – background vocals
- Sharone de Vault – background vocals
- Sherlie Matthews – background vocals
- Clydie King – background vocals
- Merry Clayton – background vocals
- Venetta Fields – background vocals
- Eddie Kendricks – background vocals
- Glenna Session – background vocals
- Maretha Stewart – background vocals

Technical

- Peter Weiss, Rafael Valentin, Sy Mitchell – engineering
- Sy Mitchell, Mixdown, Mixing
- Barry Feinstein, Tom Wilkes – design, photography
