= Herb Bernstein =

American record producer

- Born: Brooklyn, New York, U.S.
- Education: Southern Methodist University; New York University (BS, MA)
- Genres: Pop, rock, traditional pop
- Occupations: Record producer, composer, arranger, conductor, musical director
- Instruments: Piano, violin
- Spouse(s): Joyce Robinson (divorced); Anne Roselli

Herb Bernstein is an American record producer, composer, arranger, and conductor.

== Professional life ==
Herb Bernstein arranged and produced records in the 1960s, 1970s and 1980s for Laura Nyro, John Denver, Joel Grey, The Four Seasons, Bob Dylan, The Monkees, Dusty Springfield, Tina Turner, Norma Tanega, The Happenings, Tony Orlando and Dawn, Julie Budd, Lainie Kazan, Frankie Valli, Peaches & Herb, Patti Austin, Connie Francis, Lesley Gore, and Jimmy Roselli.

Bernstein's numerous hit records as producer, publisher, or arranger include "See You in September," "Go Away Little Girl," "Knock Three Times" and "Leaving on a Jet Plane, as well as "Brink of Disaster" and "I Can't Make It Without You" by Lesley Gore (released in 1967 and 1968, respectively). The Laura Nyro album More Than a New Discovery released in 1967, which Bernstein arranged and conducted, was inducted into the Grammy Hall of Fame in 1999. The album included such songs as "Wedding Bell Blues" and "Stoney End".

Bernstein served as musical director and conductor for Michael Amante. As of August 2012 he continued to work as an arranger and conductor, working with Regis Philbin and Joy Philbin, and Bernstein's longtime protegee Julie Budd, appearing with orchestras and other ensembles across the country.

Bernstein has conducted at Carnegie Hall, Lincoln Center, The Kennedy Center, and with the Buffalo, Baltimore, Austin, Hartford, South Bend, and Pittsburgh Symphony Orchestras.

On August 11, 2012, Bernstein participated in Lincoln Center's "29th Annual Roots of American Music Festival" as a panelist for the "Stoned Soul Symposium", discussing the work of Laura Nyro.

== Early life ==
Herb Bernstein was born and raised in Brooklyn, New York. He attended Southern Methodist University on a basketball scholarship, then earned his B.S. and M.A. in education at New York University. He taught at Eastern District High School before embarking on his music career.

Bernstein dabbled in music from the time he was a child, starting with violin lessons at the age of four. He later learned piano and played in various bands until he broke into the record business full-time in the mid-1960s.

== Personal life ==
In the 1960s, Bernstein was married to Joyce Robinson, a dancer with whom he had two daughters: Jill and Ellyn. He has two granddaughters, Alyson and Rachel. He and his second wife, Anne Roselli, daughter of Jimmy Roselli, have a son Michael Bernstein.
