= The Hymn of a Broken Man =

Studio album by Times of Grace
- Released: January 18, 2011
- Recorded: 2007–2010
- Studio: Zing Recording Studios, Westfield, Massachusetts; Wicked Good Studios, Massachusetts
- Genre: Metalcore; alternative metal
- Length: 52:56
- Label: Roadrunner
- Producer: Adam Dutkiewicz

Times of Grace chronology
The Hymn of a Broken Man (2011)	Songs of Loss and Separation (2021)

Singles from The Hymn of a Broken Man
- 1. "Strength in Numbers" Released: September 27, 2010

Alternative cover
- Single cover for "Strength in Numbers"

The Hymn of a Broken Man is the debut album by American heavy metal band Times of Grace, released on January 18, 2011, through Roadrunner Records.

== Background ==
When touring the UK with Killswitch Engage, guitarist Adam Dutkiewicz required emergency surgery on his back. While in the hospital recovering, he began writing new material which he later recorded and demoed at home. Dutkiewicz later contacted former Killswitch Engage bandmate and singer Jesse Leach about writing lyrics and recording vocals feeling that he "[doesn't] think [he is] the greatest vocalist and lyricist" and "wanted a little help in that department." Under the moniker Times of Grace, they began recording material in 2008 with Dutkiewicz stating on the group's Myspace that the songs were "an epic mix of Metal/Rock/Pop/Shoe gaze & Punk. All of your metal expectations will be incorrect, we are pushing genre boundaries". They hoped to release an album of finished material by the summer of 2009.

After completing the recording of material in 2009, Times of Grace returned in 2010 to release their debut album. Dutkiewicz recorded vocals, guitars, bass and drums for the album with Leach providing lead vocals and lyrics. In September, they filmed a video for the single "Strength in Numbers", with debut album The Hymn of a Broken Man scheduled for release on November 9. However, the album's release was delayed with a new release date of January 18, 2011. The majority of songs on the album are played in Drop D tuning, although for the songs "Fight for Life", "Until the End of Days", "The End of Eternity" and "Fall From Grace" Adam uses a 7 string tuned to Drop A.

A limited CD/DVD edition was also released, featuring 13 companion videos made by Agata Alexander which present a visual interpretation of the album.

== Reception ==
Professional ratings
Aggregate scores
Source	Rating
Metacritic	69/100
Review scores
Source	Rating
About.com	3.5/5 stars
AbsolutePunk	80%
Allmusic	3.5/5 stars
Artistdirect	5/5 stars
BBC Music	favorable
Blistering	8.5/10
PopMatters	8/10
Rock Sound	8/10

=== Critical ===
The Hymn of a Broken Man received generally positive reviews, scoring a 69 out of 100 on Metacritic based on seven reviews. Allmusic reviewer Phil Freeman commented that "Anyone who thought Times of Grace was going to represent some radical departure is bound to be disappointed. Anybody who comes to it expecting melodic metal with hardcore crunch, occasional bits of post-rock guitar, and angsty yet ultimately life-affirming lyrics, on the other hand, will be pleased." Rick Florino of Artistdirect gave the album a perfect score of five out of five, commenting that "The Hymn of a Broken Man functions as a heavy, heartfelt journey through pain," and that "Times Of Grace are the future. Let another new age begin."

=== Commercial ===
Upon release, The Hymn of a Broken Man charted at number 44 on the Billboard 200, selling nearly 10,000 copies. It also debuted at number 2 on the Hard Rock charts and number 13 on the Rock album chart overall as well.

== Track listing ==
All lyrics are written by Jesse Leach and Adam Dutkiewicz; all music is composed by Adam Dutkiewicz.

No.	Title	Length
1.	"Strength in Numbers"	4:16
2.	"Fight for Life"	3:36
3.	"Willing"	3:23
4.	"Where the Spirit Leads Me"	3:36
5.	"Until the End of Days"	4:21
6.	"Live in Love"	3:49
7.	"In the Arms of Mercy" (instrumental)	1:54
8.	"Hymn of a Broken Man"	3:13
9.	"The Forgotten One"	4:38
10.	"Hope Remains"	4:49
11.	"The End of Eternity"	5:52
12.	"Worlds Apart"	4:33
13.	"Fall from Grace"	4:57
Total length:		52:56

Deluxe Edition and Japanese edition bonus track
No.	Title	Length
14.	"Willing" (acoustic version)	3:25
Total length:		56:22

Deluxe Edition bonus DVD
No.	Title	Length
1.	"Strength in Numbers" (music video)
2.	"Strength in Numbers" (visual interpretation)
3.	"Fight for Life" (visual interpretation)
4.	"Willing" (visual interpretation)
5.	"Where the Spirit Leads Me" (visual interpretation)
6.	"Until the End of Days" (visual interpretation)
7.	"Live in Love" (visual interpretation)
8.	"In the Arms of Mercy" (visual interpretation)
9.	"Hymn of a Broken Man" (visual interpretation)
10.	"The Forgotten One" (visual interpretation)
11.	"Hope Remains" (visual interpretation)
12.	"The End of Eternity" (visual interpretation)
13.	"Worlds Apart" (visual interpretation)
14.	"Fall from Grace" (visual interpretation)

== Personnel ==
Credits are adapted from the album's liner notes.

Times of Grace

- Adam Dutkiewicz – vocals, lead guitar, rhythm guitar, bass guitar, drums
- Jesse Leach – vocals

Additional musicians

- Rebekah Dutkiewicz – backing vocals (tracks 4, 6, 12)

Production and design

- Adam Dutkiewicz – production, engineering, mixing
- Jim Fogarty – engineering
- Ted Jensen – mastering
- Monte Conner – A&R
- Jesse Leach – art direction
- Dan Mandell – art direction, design, photography
- Gail Marowitz – art direction

== Charts ==
Chart performance
Chart (2011)	Peak position
Australian Albums (ARIA)	44
Canadian Albums (Nielsen SoundScan)	70
German Albums (Offizielle Top 100)	90
UK Albums (OCC)	106
UK Rock & Metal Albums (OCC)	9
US Billboard 200	44
US Top Hard Rock Albums (Billboard)	2
US Top Rock Albums (Billboard)	13
US Top Tastemaker Albums (Billboard)	19
