= Dissolve (album) =

Studio album by Tusks
- Released: 13 October 2017
- Length: 36:33
- Label: One Little Indian
- Producer: Brett Cox

Tusks chronology
False (2016)	Dissolve (2017)

Professional ratings
Aggregate scores
Source	Rating
Metacritic	75/100
Review scores
Source	Rating
The 405	7.5/10
Clash	7/10
The Line of Best Fit	6.5/10

Dissolve is the debut studio album by English electronic musician Tusks. It was released on 13 October 2017 through One Little Indian Records.

== Track listing ==
No.	Title	Length
1.	"For You"	3:49
2.	"False"	3:07
3.	"Last"	3:18
4.	"Dissolve"	3:20
5.	"1807"	2:01
6.	"Paris"	3:38
7.	"Ivy"	4:11
8.	"Toronto"	3:19
9.	"My Love"	4:34
10.	"London Thunder"	5:16
