= Kedr Livanskiy =

Russian musician, singer-songwriter, producer and DJ (born 1990)

- Born: Yana Kedrina; 4 October 1990 (age 35); Moscow, Russian SFSR, Soviet Union
- Genres: Electropop; indie electronic; synth-pop; lo-fi
- Occupations: Musician; singer-songwriter; producer; DJ
- Instruments: Vocals; keyboards; synthesizer; drum machine
- Years active: 2008–present
- Labels: 2MR
- Website: kedrlivanskiy.bandcamp.com

Yana Kedrina (Russian: Яна Кедрина; born 4 October 1990), better known by her stage name Kedr Livanskiy, (Note: Russian: Кедр Ливанский, lit. 'Lebanese cedar') is a Russian electronic musician, singer-songwriter, record producer and DJ.

== Life and career ==
Kedrina was born on 4 October 1990 in Moscow, Russian SFSR. She started her music career as a singer in the short-lived punk rock band Hesburger, after briefly playing drums in a sludge group. During this time, she majored in literature at college, before enrolling to Moscow School of New Cinema.

In the early 2010s, Kedrina and her friends started the underground musical collective Johns' Kingdom, which spawned her interest in electronic music. After debuting her tracks under the name Kedr Livanskiy on SoundCloud, she signed to New Jersey–based record label 2MR, which was co-founded by Mike Simonetti of Troubleman Unlimited and Mike Sniper of Captured Tracks.

In late 2015, Kedrina released her debut single, "Sgoraet", which was followed by her 2016 EP, January Sun. 2MR issued her debut full-length album, Ariadna in September 2017. Her second studio album, dub- and deep house-influenced Your Need, was released in 2019. In August 2021, she announced a new album titled Liminal Soul that was released on October 1, 2021. Her fourth studio album, Myrthus Myth, was released on 7 March 2025.

== Musical style and influences ==
AllMusic's Paul Simpson characterized Kedr Livanskiy's music as lo-fi electronic pop and indie electronic that draws on '90s techno and jungle influences, while labeling her early songs as "wintry lo-fi house and jungle tracks with supremely haunting vocal melodies." Aimee Cliff of The Guardian described her style as "shoegaze-y electronic music that sounds as if it has arrived in a time capsule from a retro-futurist era." Her debut EP, January Sun, featured elements from "'90s-era UK electronic music, dreamy alt-rock and radio pop." Her subsequent releases eschewed software synthesizers in favor of analog gear, including Roland SH-101 and Roland Juno-106; 2017's Ariadna was compared to the works of techno producers Patricia and Huerco S. Her second album, Your Need, employed Roland TR-808 as a backbone and featured production input from Russian producer Flaty. Kedr Livanskiy's lyrics are sung in Russian and English.

Kedrina has cited Autechre, Aphex Twin, Boards of Canada and Mazzy Star as influences. She also noted MTV and 90s musical aesthetic as influences on her early releases, while her second album Your Need was driven by her love of "DJing classic house, breakbeat, and garage," as well as bassline, speed garage and grime.

== Discography ==
Studio albums

- January Sun (2016; 2MR)
- Ariadna (2017; 2MR)
- Your Need (2019; 2MR)
- Liminal Soul (2021; 2MR)
- Myrthus Myth (2025; 2MR)

EPs

- Sgoraet (2015; 2MR)
- ОСЕНЬ-AUTUMN (2018; 2MR)

Singles

- "No More Summer Rain" (2014; 2MR)
- "There Was a Time (было время)" (2018; 2MR)

Music videos

- "solnce yanvarya" (2014)
- "соловьиные песни" (2014)
- "No More Summer Rain" (2015)
- "razrushitelniy krug" (2015)
- "Otvechai za slova (Keep Your Word)" (2016)
- "Ariadna" (2017)
- "Your Name" (2017)
- "There Was a Time (было время)" (2018)
- "Kiska" (2019)
- "Sky Kisses" (2019)
- "Ivan Kupala (New Day) (Иван купала)" (2020)
- "Stars Light Up (Посмотри на небо)" (2021)
- "Boy" (2021)
- "Your Turn" (2021)
- "With Love K..." (2023)
- "K-Notes" (2023)
- "Spades on Hearts" (2025)
