= Sam Williams (singer) =

American singer-songwriter (born 1997)

- Born: Samuel Weston Williams; May 30, 1997 (age 29); Nashville, Tennessee, U.S
- Family: Hank Williams, Jr. (father); Hank Williams (grandfather)
- Musical career
- Genres: Country music
- Occupations: Musician; singer; songwriter
- Years active: 2019–present
- Label: UMG Nashville
- Website: samwilliamsofficial.com

Samuel Weston Williams (born May 30, 1997), is an American singer-songwriter, whose primary musical style is country music. His debut studio album Glasshouse Children was released in August 2021. He is the son of Hank Williams Jr., and the grandson of Hank Williams.

== Biography ==
Samuel Weston Williams was born on May 30, 1997, in Nashville, Tennessee, to Hank Williams Jr. and Mary Jane (née Thomas) Williams, and grew up in Paris, Tennessee. He is the grandson of Hank Williams and is also the half-brother of Holly Williams and Hank Williams III.

== Career ==
In April 2019, he made his late–night television debut on Late Night with Stephen Colbert, singing "Can't Fool Your Own Blood". He performed the number from the empty Franklin, Tennessee, home where his grandfather used to live. In October 2019, he made his debut on the Grand Ole Opry, performing the same song. He also traveled through Europe during 2019, as the opening act for Cam, on the Country to Country Festival tour. In June 2021, he signed with Universal Music Group Nashville, and his debut album Glasshouse Children was released in August 2021. He enlisted songwriters Luke Dick and Scooter Carusoe to aid him turn "strange poems with big words" into songs for the album. He convinced Dolly Parton to sing on the track "Happy All The Time", by writing her a two-page letter describing the song, hoping it would move her to collaborate with him. He co-wrote the track with Mary Gauthier, and it was produced by Bobby Holland and Sean McConnell. He also partnered with Keith Urban on the track "Kids". A year later, in October 2022, he released a deluxe edition of the album titled, Glasshouse Children: Tilted Crown, which included six extra tracks, in addition to the original ten tracks. A music video was also released in conjunction with the album.

In August and September of 2022, he went on tour with Marty Stuart, with scheduled performances in Sweden, Norway, Denmark, Germany and Switzerland. He also saw his debut album released in the United Kingdom on Snakefarm Records. In September 2023, he released a cover version of his grandfather's hit "I'm So Lonesome I Could Cry". He was initially reluctant to cover his grandfather's music, because he was afraid he "could mess up something that's sacred". The song was released on September 15, two days before what would have been his grandfather's 100th birthday. He also sang the single at the Grand Ole Opry in October 2021.

In February 2024, he collaborated with Carter Faith for a duet that covered Tammy Wynette's "'Til I Can Make It on My Own", which they also performed together at the Grand Ole Opry. In June 2024, Williams appeared in the country music documentary Rebel Country, where he discusses "challenging the status quo in country music by embracing his sexuality". In addition, he released his second studio album, Act I: Scarlet Lonesome, and performed at GLAAD's 2024 Concert for Love & Acceptance in June. His song "Carnival Heart", written by Williams, PJ Harding and Ned Houston, was included in Songblazers, a country-themed show by Cirque du Soleil that toured the United States in 2024.

In February 2025, he released the title track to his next project, Act II: COUNTRYSTAR. The full album was released on July 11, 2025 with the single "HONKYTONKIN'", a reimagined version of his grandfathers 1947 track of the same name. To date, Sam has performed at the Grand Ole Opry 19 times.

Williams said some of his musical influences have been David Bowie, during his Ziggy Stardust period, his grandfather Hank Williams, Justin Bieber and Drake. He also recalls buying Chris Brown's first album and learning "every word to every song". In addition to being a songwriter, he is also a poet.

== Personal life ==
In 2015, Williams moved to Nashville to attend Belmont University, and he has also studied international relations at University of Miami. When he was 19, he had a son. In June 2020, his sister Katherine Williams-Dunning, died in a car accident. His mother died in March 2022, in Jupiter, Florida. In October 2022, he came out and identified as being gay. He said when he was growing up he tried to hide his sexuality, and he believes it would have been "impactful" for him, if he had seen "somebody like myself doing an interview like this".

== Discography ==
- Glasshouse Children (2021)
- Glasshouse Children: Tilted Crown (2022)
- Act I: Scarlet Lonesome (2024)
- Act II: COUNTRYSTAR (2025)

== See also ==
- List of country music performers
- Music of Tennessee
