= Songs of Loss and Separation =

Studio album by Times of Grace
- Released: July 16, 2021
- Recorded: 2017–2020
- Studio: Wicked Good Studios, Massachusetts
- Genre: Post-rock; alternative rock; hard rock; metalcore
- Length: 48:50
- Label: Wicked Good
- Producer: Adam Dutkiewicz

Times of Grace chronology
| The Hymn of a Broken Man (2011) | Songs of Loss and Separation (2021) |

Singles from Songs of Loss and Separation
- 1. "The Burden of Belief" Released: May 20, 2021

Professional ratings
Review scores
| Source | Rating |
|---|---|
| Blabbermouth.net | 7/10 |
| Kerrang! | 4/5 |
| Metal Hammer | 4/5 stars |
| Sonic Perspectives | 8.5/10 |
| Sputnikmusic | 2.9/5 |
| Wall of Sound | 7/10 |

Songs of Loss and Separation is the second album by American rock band Times of Grace, released on July 16, 2021, through Wicked Good Records. It is their first album with drummer Dan Gluszak.

== Background and release ==
In 2016, the band reformed after a four-year hiatus and stated they have material written for five new Times of Grace songs.

In December 2017, the band entered the studio recording its follow-up to The Hymn of a Broken Man with former live drummer Dan Gluszak as their new official member of the band.

On June 24, 2020, Leach confirmed that the band's second album was completed, as a result of the tour for the album Atonement by the main band of members Adam Dutkiewicz and Jesse Leach, Killswitch Engage, being postponed due to COVID.

In May 2021, the band announced Songs of Loss and Separation would be released on July 16, 2021. They also released their first single from the album, "The Burden of Belief".

== Track listing ==
All lyrics are written by Jesse Leach and Adam Dutkiewicz; all music is composed by Adam Dutkiewicz.

Songs of Loss and Separation track listing
| No. | Title | Length |
|---|---|---|
| 1. | "The Burden of Belief" | 5:36 |
| 2. | "Mend You" | 4:21 |
| 3. | "Rescue" | 3:42 |
| 4. | "Far From Heavenless" | 6:00 |
| 5. | "Bleed Me" | 4:13 |
| 6. | "Medusa" | 6:02 |
| 7. | "Currents" | 3:49 |
| 8. | "To Carry the Weight" | 4:03 |
| 9. | "Cold" | 4:33 |
| 10. | "Forever" | 6:31 |
| Total length: | | 48:50 |

== Personnel ==
Times of Grace

- Adam Dutkiewicz – vocals, guitars, bass
- Jesse Leach – vocals
- Dan Gluszak – drums

Production and design

- Adam Dutkiewicz – production, engineering, mixing
- Ted Jensen – mastering
- John McCormack – cover art
- Tom Bejgrowicz – art direction, design, layout

== Charts ==
Chart performance
| Chart (2021) | Peak position |
|---|---|
| German Albums (Offizielle Top 100) | 72 |
| Swiss Albums (Schweizer Hitparade) | 99 |
