= Darlinghurst (band) =

Australian country music band

- Origin: Melbourne, Australia
- Genre: Country
- Instrument: Vocals
- Years active: 2017–present
- Labels: Helium; Nybor
- Members: Cassie Leopold
- Past members: Jason Resch; Matt Darvidis; Pagan Newman
- Website: www.darlinghurst-band.com

Darlinghurst is an Australian country music project, formed as a band in 2017 by Jason Resch, Pagan Newman, Cassie Leopold and Matt Darvidis. The group's debut self-titled studio album was released on 24 September 2021 and debuted at No. 1 on the ARIA Country album chart and No. 9 on the all-genre ARIA album chart. The group's first six singles peaked within the top 5 of the Australian Country Radio chart.

On 30 November 2023, Darlinghurst the group became a female duo after Resch and Darvidis left the group.

On 17 January 2025, it was officially announced that Newman had left the duo, leaving Leopold the sole member.

== History ==
In the late 2000s, Jason Resch lived in the United Kingdom, working as songwriter where he co-write "The Promise" for Girls Aloud, "The Boy Does Nothing" for Alesha Dixon and "All Fired Up" for The Saturdays as well as songs with Kylie Minogue and the Pet Shop Boys. In 2013, Resch relocated to and lived in United States before returning to Australia in 2015, intent on creating a new band. Resch says "After the run of hits in Britain and the two-year writing sessions in Los Angeles and Nashville, I returned to Melbourne at the end of 2015 with my options open. I've always loved music and always wanted to write great songs. But I knew something would happen and I figured if I met up with like-minded people, we'd form a band."

In 2017 in Melbourne, Resch was recording at Secret Sound Studios when its co-owner, producer Peter Dacy, told him of two singers using his studio to record original country songs. The plan was for him to write some songs for them, but as soon as Resch met Cassie Leopoldand and Pagan Newman they decided to form a band. Leopold had performed backing vocals for Christine Anu and Olivia Newton-John while Newman had recorded a soul album in the United States and was a music teacher. Leopold and Newman had toured together in a number of tribute bands with Newman saying in 2019 "It was so much fun... with Cassie we were doing a whole heap of seventies and eighties. We did ABBA, Soul Sisters, we did Beach Boys. I'm probably missing a whole heap, but we delved into a lot of them."

In 2019, Leopold came up with the name for the band saying "I'd just written a film script called Darlinghurst about a group of misfits who come from all around Australia to audition for a musical, which is being staged to save a music theatre from being taken away from its owner. It had a country music feel to it, the 'darling' aspect had strong connotations to country music and besides, it was the only name the three of us would agree on."

In 2019, Matt Darvidis was added based on a suggestion from Dacy.

On 2 August 2019, Darlinghurst released their debut single "Sorry Won’t Get You Back". This was followed by singles "So Long So Long" "Picture Frame" and "Gotta Go Rodeo" which all reached the Country music top five.

"Where Do We Go" was released in January 2021, "Unfaithful" was released in May 2021, and "You Stopped Making Sense" featuring Shannon Noll was released in August 2021. All seven singles appear on their debut self-titled album, which was announced on 28 July 2021 alongside an Australian tour.

On 22 July 2022, the group joined Amber Lawrence on her release, "Living For The Highlights".

On 24 March 2023, Darlinghurst released "A Little Love" with Joe Camilleri and The Black Sorrows. Camilleri said "A Little Love' is a joyous, upbeat pop country song with a universal message. I knew Darlinghurst could turn a rough diamond into a gem of a track with their musicality and incredible harmonies… like a vintage guitar with fresh strings."

In January 2024, the new duo of Pagan and Cassie released "Unapologetic" that hit number one on the Countrytown Hottest 50 Chart. They followed with the bluegrass track, "Gypsy Girl", in June 2024 and the country rock anthem, "I Shouldn't Be Drinking" in August 2024.

== Band members ==
=== Current members ===
- Cassie Leopold – vocals, songwriter (2017–present)

=== Former members ===
- Jason Resch – vocals, songwriter, guitar (2017–2023)
- Matt Darvidis – vocals, songwriter, guitar (2019–2023)
- Pagan Newman – vocals, songwriter (2017–2025)

== Discography ==
List of studio albums, with release date and label shown
Title	Album details	Peak chart positions
Title	Album details	AUS
Darlinghurst	Released: 24 September 2021; Label: Helium Records, MGM (HRDA2); Formats: CD, digital download, streaming	9

== Awards and nominations ==
=== CMAA Awards ===
The Country Music Awards of Australia is an annual awards night held in January during the Tamworth Country Music Festival, celebrating recording excellence in the Australian country music industry.

Year	Nominee / work	Award	Result	Ref.
2021	Darlinghurst	New Talent of the Year	Nominated	
2022	Darlinghurst ("Where Do We Go")	New Talent of the Year	Won	
2022	Darlinghurst	Country Music Capital News Group or Duo of the Year	Nominated	
2022	Darlinghurst ("Darlinghurst")	Contemporary Album of the Year	Nominated	
2025	Darlinghurst	Country Music Capital News Group or Duo of the Year	Nominated	
