= Times of Grace =

American metalcore band

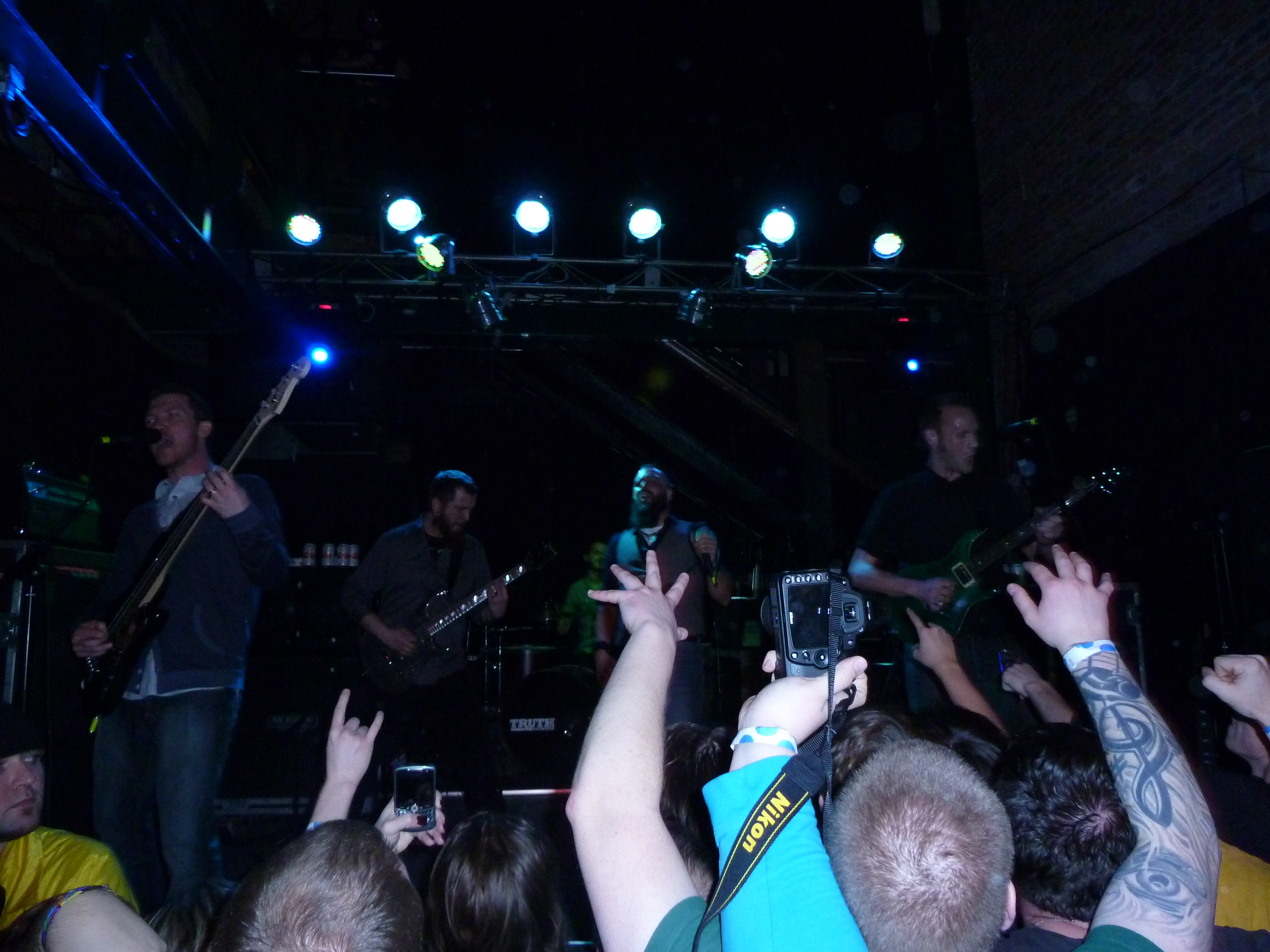
- Times of Grace performing in 2011

Background information
- Origin: Southampton, Massachusetts, U.S.
- Genres: Metalcore; alternative metal
- Years active: 2007–2012; 2016–present
- Labels: Wicked Good, Roadrunner
- Members: Adam Dutkiewicz; Jesse Leach; Dan Gluszak
- Website: timesofgraceband.com

Times of Grace is an American metalcore band formed in Southampton, Massachusetts. The group consists of Adam Dutkiewicz (Killswitch Engage) and Jesse Leach (Killswitch Engage, The Empire Shall Fall, and Seemless) while guitarist Joel Stroetzel (Killswitch Engage), bassist Matt Bachand (rhythm guitarist in Shadows Fall), drummer Dan Gluszak (formerly of Envy on the Coast) complete the touring lineup. An album was planned for 2009. However, the group remained largely inactive until 2010, releasing the single "Strength in Numbers", with their debut album, titled The Hymn of a Broken Man, released in 2011 through Roadrunner Records.

== History ==
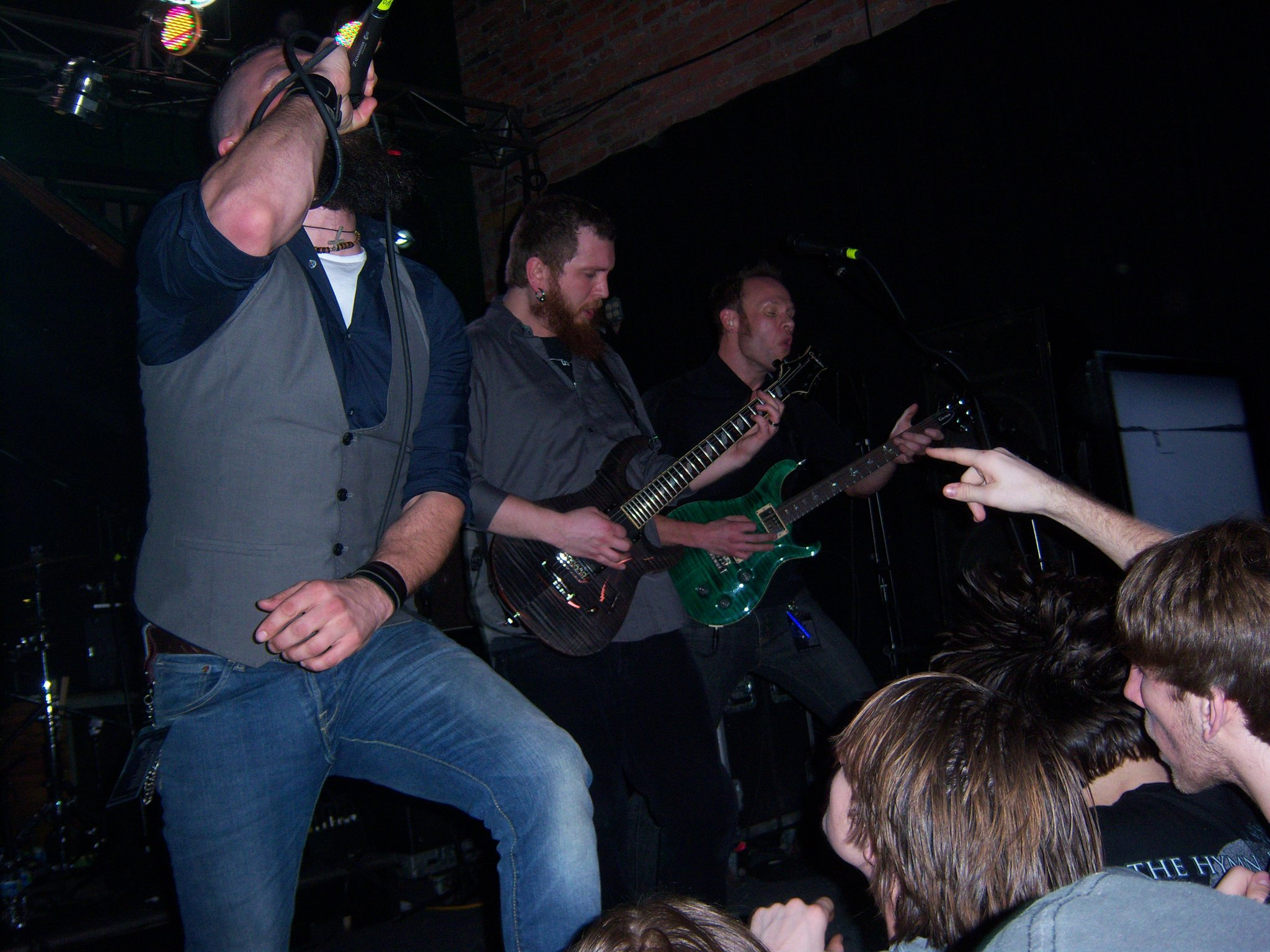
Jesse Leach, Joel Stroetzel and Adam Dutkiewicz

=== Formation and The Hymn of a Broken Man (2007–2012) ===
When touring the UK with Killswitch Engage, guitarist Adam Dutkiewicz required emergency surgery on his back. While in the hospital, he wrote new material which he later recorded and demoed at home. Dutkiewicz later contacted former Killswitch Engage bandmate and singer Jesse Leach about writing lyrics and recording vocals feeling that he "[doesn't] think [he is] the greatest vocalist and lyricist so [he] wanted a little help in that department." Under the moniker Times of Grace, they began recording material in 2008 with Dutkiewicz stating on the group's Myspace that the songs were "an epic mix of Metal/Rock/Pop/Shoe gaze & Punk. All of your metal expectations will be incorrect, we are pushing genre boundaries". They hoped to release an album of finished material by the summer of 2009.

After completing the recording of material in 2009, Times of Grace returned in 2010 to release their debut album. Dutkiewicz recorded vocals, guitars, bass and drums for the album with Leach providing lead vocals and lyrics. In September, they filmed a video for the single "Strength in Numbers", with debut album The Hymn of a Broken Man scheduled for release on November 9. However, the album's release was delayed with a new release date of January 18, 2011.

When asked if they would be touring in support of the album, Dutkiewicz stated that they would wait until "the record [is] released" then begin "building the band one person at a time." They released videos for the songs "Strength in Numbers" and "Where the Spirit Leads Me" before announcing a February tour of the US. Times of Grace's touring lineup was announced in January 2011. Along with Dutkiewicz and Leach, the band consisted of Killswitch Engage guitarist Joel Stroetzel, former Five Pointe O vocalist Daniel Struble playing bass, as well as former Envy on the Coast drummer Dan Gluszak. On May 16, 2011, the band announced that Matt Bachand, guitarist with Shadows Fall, will be joining the band on bass for their tour dates in Europe, as well as their tour supporting Underoath in America.

Upon release, The Hymn of a Broken Man charted at number 44 on the Billboard 200, selling nearly 10,000 copies. The band performed at the 2011 Download Festival on the Pepsi Max stage and the 2012 Soundwave Festival in Australia.

=== Hiatus and the second album (2013–2021) ===
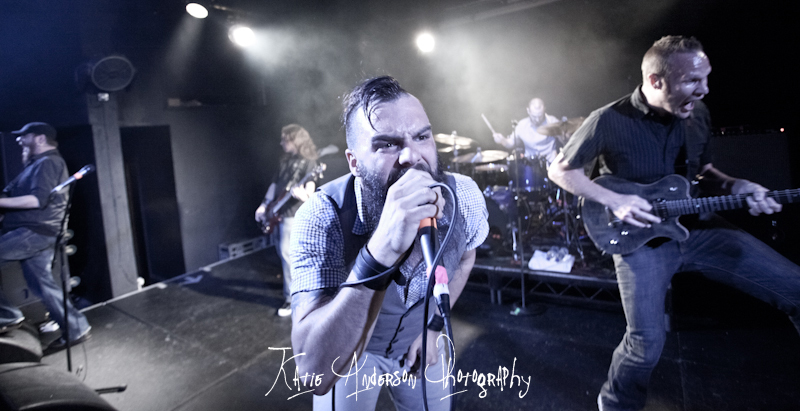
Times of Grace live in 2011

The band went on hiatus after vocalist Jesse Leach rejoined Killswitch Engage in February 2012.

In 2014, Leach addressed Times of Grace's inactivity, stating, "The future is unwritten with that project, but it's still something that Adam [and I] have in our hearts and our minds."

In 2016, the band stated they have material written for five new Times of Grace songs.

In December 2017, the band entered the studio recording its follow-up to The Hymn of a Broken Man with former live drummer Dan Gluszak as their new official member of the band.

On September 19, 2019, Leach made a post on Instagram saying that he had his bags packed and was about to head out to California to record what he hoped would be the last two recording sessions on Times of Grace's upcoming second album. He said that the lyrics on the upcoming album they are working are "the deep, painful and soul searching type that can not be forced or faked" and elaborated on how he had to dig deep to get the right words for the songs.

On June 24, 2020, Leach confirmed that the band's second album was completed.

On June 30, the band posted a video to their official Instagram account featuring Dutkiewicz and Gluszak performing a cover of "All I Need" by Radiohead.

=== Comeback and Songs of Loss and Separation (2021–present) ===
On January 18, 2021, the band announced their comeback to celebrate The Hymn of a Broken Man's tenth anniversary. In May 2021, the band announced that their second album, Songs of Loss and Separation, would be released on July 16, 2021; they also released their first single from the album, "The Burden of Belief". On July 4, 2021, they released another single from the new album titled "Rescue".

In 2025, when asked on the possibility of a third Times of Grace album Leach stated "I would love that, but I don't foresee that happening anytime soon."

== Band members ==
Current members

- Adam Dutkiewicz – vocals, guitar, bass (2007–2012, 2016–present), drums (2007–2012)
- Jesse Leach – vocals (2007–2012, 2016–present)
- Dan Gluszak – drums, percussion (2017–present; 2011-2012 touring only)

Former touring members

- Daniel Struble – bass, backing vocals (2011)
- Joel Stroetzel – guitar (2011–2012)
- Matt Bachand – bass, backing vocals (2011–2012)

== Discography ==
- The Hymn of a Broken Man (2011)
- Songs of Loss and Separation (2021)

=== Music videos ===
- 2011: "Strength in Numbers"
- 2011: "Live in Love"
- 2011: "Where the Spirit Leads Me"
- 2021: "The Burden of Belief"
- 2021: "Medusa"
- 2021: "Rescue"
- 2021: "Mend You"
- 2021: "Currents"
- 2021: "Bleed Me"
