= Tusks (musician) =

English singer and electronic musician

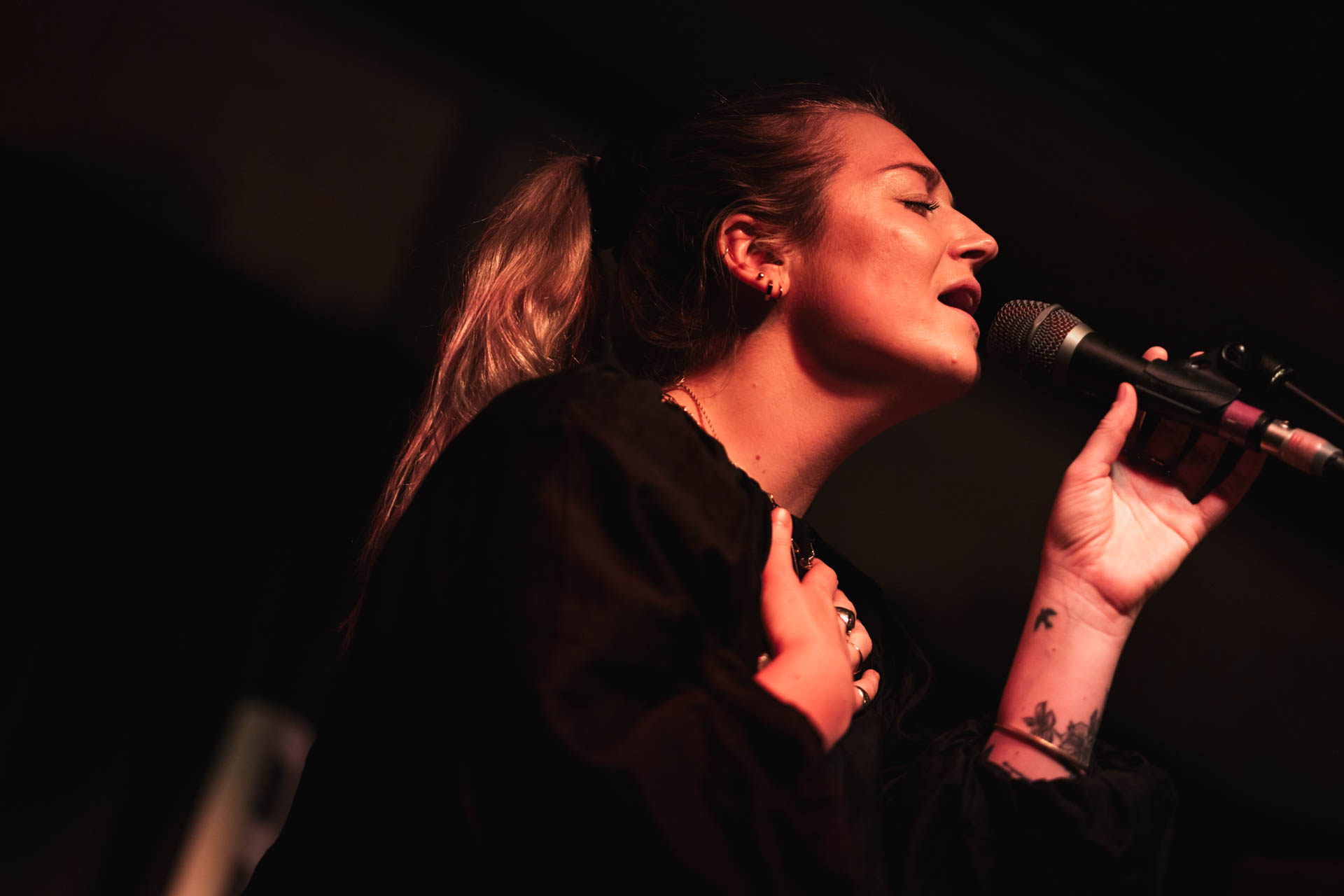
in 2024 by Paul Hudson

Tusks is the stage name of Emily Underhill, an English singer and electronic musician from London.

Underhill first released the Snow EP under her own name in 2012, and took the name Tusks upon releasing the Ink EP in 2014. In 2016, she signed with the label One Little Indian and issued the four-song False EP, three of whose songs would later be included on her debut full-length album. She issued that full-length on One Little Indian in October 2017, entitled Dissolve. Underhill co-produced the album alongside Brett Cox. The album drew comparisons to London Grammar, The XX, and James Blake, gaining support from the likes of BBC 6 Music's Lauren Laverne and Radio 1's Annie Mac, MixMag, DIY, LOBF, MOJO, 405, Wonderland and more.

In 2019, Underhill released her sophomore album Avalanche. Drawing from a greater wealth of influences including My Bloody Valentine, Marika Hackman and Wolf Alice, the album went on to gain support from Rolling Stone, Billboard, Complex, Radio X and gain syncs across numerous TV shows, including Netflix's hit series '13 Reasons Why'.

After a mini hiatus in which Underhill honed her production and engineering skills at Ten87 Studios in Tottenham, Tusks released her third album ‘Gold’ in April 2024 via One Little Independent.

In 2024, Tusks featured on the cover of "You Are My Sunshine" with Benji Merrison & Will Slater for the Netflix documentary Capturing the Killer Nurse.

== Discography ==
- Ink EP (2014)
- False EP (2016)
- Dissolve (One Little Indian, 2017)
- Avalanche (One Little Indian, 2019)
- Change (One Little Indian, 2021)
- Gold (One Little Indian, 2024)
- Gold - The Remixes EP (2025)
