= Flim Flam Man (song) =

Single by Barbra Streisand

from the album Stoney End
- B-side: "Maybe"
- Released: May 1971
- Recorded: 1970
- Studio: United Western Recorders (Las Vegas, NV)
- Genre: Pop, Easy Listening
- Label: Columbia
- Songwriter(s): Laura Nyro
- Producer(s): Richard Perry

Barbra Streisand singles chronology
"Time and Love" (1971)	"Flim Flam Man" (1971)	"Where You Lead" (1971)

"Flim Flam Man" is a song written by Laura Nyro . It was first recorded and released by Nyro in February 1967 on her debut album More Than a New Discovery.

== Barbra Streisand recording ==
The best-known version of the song was a hit for Barbra Streisand in 1971 (as "Hands Off The Man (Flim Flam Man)"). It was the final single of three releases from her Stoney End LP. The song was suggested to Streisand by record producer Richard Perry.

The song reached number 82 on the US Billboard Hot 100 in early 1971. It also reached number seven on the US Easy Listening chart. In Canada it peaked at number 62 (and #17 Adult Contemporary).

=== Chart performance ===
Chart (1970–71)	Peak position
Canada RPM Top Singles	62
Canada RPM Adult Contemporary	17
US Billboard Hot 100	82
US Billboard Easy Listening	7
US Cash Box Top 100	69

== Other versions ==
"Flim Flam Man" has also been recorded by Peggy Lipton (1968), Robin Wilson (1971), Don Lane (1973), Janice Hoyte (1974) and Grace Cosgrove (2012).
