= Glasshouse Children =

Studio album by Sam Williams
- Released: August 20, 2021
- Genre: Country; folk; rock; soul
- Length: 35:35 (2021); 56:12 (2022)
- Label: UMG Nashville
- Producer: Tommy Cecil; Paul Moak; Jaren Johnston; Sean McConnell

Glasshouse Children is a 2021 American country music album by Sam Williams. It is his debut studio album and was released on August 20, 2021. Dolly Parton and Keith Urban sing duets with Williams on the album. A deluxe version of the album was released on October 14, 2022, with six additional tracks. Williams is the son of Hank Williams Jr., and the grandson of Hank Williams.

== Background ==
Williams initially announced he was going to release the album independently, before he signed with Universal Music Group Nashville in June 2021. The album was primarily recorded in Nashville, and he recruited veteran producers Jaren Johnston, Sean McConnell and Paul Moak to work on the project. His singles "Can’t Fool Your Own Blood" and "Happy All The Time" were co-written by him and Mary Gauthier. Gauthier said she admired William's devotion "to separate himself from any family privilege", and she was happy to help him express "what it is he needs to say".

Williams said he considers the two tracks, "Can’t Fool Your Own Blood" and "Happy All The Time", to be the "cornerstones" of the album, and they were put together between 2017 and 2018. He had previously sang the track "Can’t Fool Your Own Blood", from his grandfathers empty home in Franklin, Tennessee, for his late–night television debut on Late Night with Stephen Colbert. He convinced Dolly Parton to sing on "Happy All The Time", by writing her a two-page letter. She responded that she would "honored to sing on it". Williams also said that the "diversity of his collaborators allowed for a dynamic approach to each of the ten varied tracks".

Williams released a deluxe edition of the album titled, Glasshouse Children: Tilted Crown, on October 14, 2022. It includes six extra tracks, in addition to the original ten tracks. He said that he wanted to include some songs that didn't make the cut on the original version, and to provide something new before he released his next album. Williams also released a music video in support of the track "Tilted Crown".

== Reception ==
Madeline Crone wrote in American Songwriter, that "the introspective record offers an unobstructed view into the artist's upbringing ... and it tells tales of hurt and loss and his hopes for healing and growth that might shift his family's story to one of redemption". Joseph Hudak of Rolling Stone highlighted the songs, "Wild Girl" and "10-4" as having "hallmarks of polished mainstream country — pulsing drums, a rapid-fire lyrical delivery — while others like "Can’t Fool Your Own Blood" and "Bulleit Blues" are raw and ragged ... all are threaded through with an underlying sadness".

Nashville Lifestyles Chris Parton opined that the album "features ten songs with a familiar gift for weary-soul poetics ... pulling from Top 40 radio, R&B, hip hop and country, Williams sounds like an old soul at 24, with a restless sense of sonic direction". Curtis Wong wrote in HuffPost, that "you won’t find discernible traces of Sam Williams's famous bloodline on his debut album ― and that’s a good thing". He went on to say that Williams is a "prolific talent in his own right whose poignant songs reflect love, family and life in general". He also favored the track, "The World Alone", which is dedicated to Williams's sister, who died in a car accident the year before.

== Music video ==
I think it's time that everyone should be allowed to be themselves and if you want to represent for people and be an ally, that's what I'd like to be.

—Sam Williams

For the deluxe edition of the album, Williams released a video for the title track, "Tilted Crown", in which he admits there was some difficulties he faced growing up closeted. Williams said it was the directors idea to include a kiss with his boyfriend towards the end of the video. He said he was reluctant at first, but changed his mind, because he felt like he "wasn't being himself ... and he thought it was the perfect opportunity to show who he was".

== Track listings ==
=== Glasshouse Children (2021) ===
No.	Title	Length
1.	"Glasshouse Children"	4:04
2.	"Happy All The Time" (featuring Dolly Parton)	3:41
3.	"Can't Fool Your Own Blood"	4:10
4.	"Bulleit Blues"	1:32
5.	"10–4"	3:17
6.	"Wild Girl"	3:21
7.	"Kids" (featuring Keith Urban)	3:57
8.	"Shuteye"	3:51
9.	"Hopeless Romanticism"	3:52
10.	"The World Alone"	3:50
Total length:		35:35

=== Glasshouse Children: Tilted Crown (2022) ===
original tracks plus six additional tracks
No.	Title	Length
1.	"Tilted Crown"	3:42
2.	"Bulleit Blues Part 2"	3:03
3.	"Blame 'Em Both"	3:40
4.	"Ragdoll"	3:12
5.	"Wild Girl (remix)"	3:02
6.	"Missing The Malice"	3:58
Total length:		56:12

== Personnel ==
Credits adapted from AllMusic

- Ben Roberts, composer, guitar, vocals
- Bobby Holland, bass, mixing, piano, producer
- Boots Ottestad, composer
- Brandy Clark, composer
- Chris Hennessee, composer
- Dan Auerbach, composer
- Daniel Tashian, composer
- Dolly Parton, vocals
- Eric Arjes, composer
- Hank Compton, composer
- Jaimee Harris, composer
- Jaren Johnston, composer, producer, vocals
- Jason Gantt, composer, drums, guitar, producer
- Justin Parker, composer
- Keith Urban, guitar, vocals
- Mary Gauthier, composer
- Paul Moak, guitar, producer
- Ronnie Bowman, composer
- Sam Williams, composer, vocals
- Sean McConnell, drums, producer
- Ted Jensen, engineer
- Tommy Cecil, producer
