= Boy Scouts (musician) =

American musician and singer-songwriter

Boy Scouts is the stage name of Oakland, California musician Taylor Vick.

== History ==
Boy Scouts began in the late 2000s. In 2010, Vick released her first album titled garagebandaid. In 2016, Vick released her second full-length album titled Homeroom Breakfast. In 2017, Vick released an EP titled Hobby Limit. In 2019, Vick released her first album on ANTI- Records titled Free Company. In 2021, Vick's second album under the moniker Boy Scouts, Wayfinder, was released on October 1.

== Discography ==
Studio albums

- garagebandaid (2010, self-released)
- Homeroom Breakfast (2016, Mt. Home Arts)
- Free Company (2019, ANTI-)
- Wayfinder (2021, ANTI-)

EPs

- Hobby Limit (2017, Processional Cross)
