= Darlinghurst (album) =

Studio album by Darlinghurst
- Released: 24 September 2021
- Studio: Secret Sound, Melbourne
- Length: 34:42
- Label: Helium
- Producer: Pete Dacy; Jason Resch

Singles from Darlinghurst
- 1. "Sorry Won't Get You Back" Released: 2 August 2019; 2. "So Long So Long" Released: 25 October 2019; 3. "Picture Frame" Released: 17 April 2020; 4. "Gotta Go Rodeo" Released: 4 September 2020; 5. "Where Do We Go" Released: January 2021; 6. "Unfaithful" Released: 14 May 2021; 7. "You Stopped Making Sense" Released: 6 August 2021

Darlinghurst is the debut studio album by Australian country band Darlinghurst. The album was announced on 28 July 2021 and released on 24 September 2021. It debuted at number 9 on the ARIA Charts.

In an interview with Scenestr, Jason Resch said: "I think there's something on the album for everyone to enjoy and relate to, and that's given I guess to our different musical backgrounds and how we are as individuals together. There will be a lot of different shade and colour among the 12 songs. We all share lead vocals, lots of harmonies, songs to go wild to, some to breakdown to. But, we invite anyone to listen to our record and make their own mind up.

== Track listing ==
No.	Title	Writer(s)	Length
1.	"So Long So Long"		3:00
2.	"Where Do We Go"	Jack Dacy; Matt Darvidis; Cassie Leopold; Pagan Newman; Jason Resch	3:35
3.	"Carousel"	Darvidis; Leopold; Newman; Resch	3:34
4.	"Sorry Won't Get You Back"	Darvidis; Leopold; Newman; Resch	3:55
5.	"Unforgettable" (available on physical edition only)
6.	"Picture Frame"	J. Dacy; Ruby Dacy; Darvidis; Leopold; Newman; Resch	3:24
7.	"Hangman" (available on physical edition only)
8.	"Genevieve"	Darvidis; Leopold; Newman; Resch	3:56
9.	"Unfaithful"	J. Dacy; Darvidis; Leopold; Newman; Resch	2:46
10.	"Gotta Go Rodeo"	Darvidis; Leopold; Newman; Resch	3:05
11.	"Bad Things"	Darvidis; Leopold; Newman; Resch	3:42
12.	"You Stopped Making Sense" (featuring Shannon Noll)	Darvidis; Leopold; Newman; Resch	3:45
Total length:			34:42

== Charts ==
Chart (2021)	Peak position
Australian Albums (ARIA)	9

== Release history ==
Country	Date	Format	Label	Catalogue
Australia	24 September 2021	CD; digital download; streaming	Helium Records	HRDA2
