= More Than a New Discovery =

Studio album by Laura Nyro
- Released: February 1967
- Recorded: Nos. 4, 7: July 13, 1966; Nos. 1–3, 5–6, 8–12: November 29, 1966
- Studio: Bell Sound (New York City)
- Genres: R&B; pop
- Length: 36:15
- Label: Verve Folkways
- Producer: Milton Okun

Laura Nyro chronology
More Than a New Discovery (1967)	Eli and the Thirteenth Confession (1968)

The First Songs
- Retitled 1973 re-release

Singles from More Than a New Discovery
- 1. "Wedding Bell Blues"/"Stoney End" Released: September 17, 1966; 2. "Goodbye Joe"/"Billy's Blues" Released: February 25, 1967; 3. ""Flim Flam Man (Hands Off the Man)"/"And When I Die" Released: April 29, 1967

Professional ratings
Review scores
Source	Rating
AllMusic	4/5 stars

More Than a New Discovery is the debut album by Bronx-born singer, songwriter and pianist Laura Nyro. It was recorded during 1966 and released early in the following year on the Verve Folkways imprint of the Verve Records label.

The name of the label was later changed to Verve Forecast and the album was re-issued on that label as The First Songs in 1969. This re-issue has a different track order and revised cover design. It peaked at No. 97 on the Billboard 200, then known as the Pop Albums chart. Starting with this release, the song "Hands Off the Man" was retitled "Flim Flam Man (Hands Off the Man)".

Columbia Records re-issued The First Songs with all-new cover art (featuring a rose illustration) in 1973.

In 1999 the album was inducted into the Grammy Hall of Fame. In 2008 Rev-Ola Records released a remastered version of the original album on Compact Disc with the original song order and the original cover art.

== Production ==
Nyro signed a contract with Verve Folkways after she gained recognition when Peter Paul and Mary recorded her song "And When I Die" in 1966.

The album was recorded in the fall of 1966 with Herb Bernstein as arranger and Milton Okun as producer. There was some uncertainty about Nyro's ability to lead the musicians by playing piano. As a result, pianist Stan Free was hired and Nyro was encouraged to play the guitar instead, an idea which she rejected.

== Songs ==
"Wedding Bell Blues" was released as a single in September 1966 and remained on the "Bubbling Under" segment of the Billboard Hot 100 (then "Pop Singles") for 12 weeks, peaking at No. 103.

For the single version of "Stoney End", Nyro was forced to rework some of the lyrics that referred to the Bible, because Verve felt it would cause too much controversy.

The album included several songs that would become hits for other artists. Blood, Sweat & Tears scored with "And When I Die" (US No. 2), the 5th Dimension with "Wedding Bell Blues" (US No. 1) and "Blowin' Away" (US No. 21), and Barbra Streisand with "Stoney End" (US No. 6) and "Flim Flam Man" (US No. 82).

== Track listing ==
=== More Than a New Discovery ===
All tracks are written by Laura Nyro.

Side one
No.	Title	Length
1.	"Goodbye Joe"	2:38
2.	"Billy's Blues"	3:20
3.	"And When I Die"	2:40
4.	"Stoney End"	2:46
5.	"Lazy Susan"	3:53
6.	"Hands Off the Man" (later known as "Flim Flam Man")	2:29

Side two
No.	Title	Length
1.	"Wedding Bell Blues"	2:44
2.	"Buy and Sell"	3:38
3.	"He's a Runner"	3:40
4.	"Blowin' Away"	2:23
5.	"I Never Meant to Hurt You"	2:52
6.	"California Shoeshine Boys"	2:45

=== The First Songs ===
All tracks are written by Laura Nyro.

Side one
No.	Title	Length
1.	"Wedding Bell Blues"	2:44
2.	"Billy's Blues"	3:20
3.	"California Shoeshine Boys"	2:45
4.	"Blowin' Away"	2:23
5.	"Lazy Susan"	3:53
6.	"Goodbye Joe"	2:38

Side two
No.	Title	Length
1.	"Flim Flam Man"	2:29
2.	"Stoney End"	2:46
3.	"I Never Meant to Hurt You"	2:56
4.	"He's a Runner"	3:40
5.	"Buy and Sell"	3:38
6.	"And When I Die"	2:40

== Personnel ==
- Laura Nyro – guitar, keyboards, vocals, songwriter
- Jay Berliner – guitar
- Stan Free – piano
- Bill LaVorgna – drums
- Buddy Lucas – harmonica
- Lou Mauro – double bass
- James Sedlar – French horn
- Herb Bernstein – arranger, conductor, flugelhorn

Technical

- Milton Okun – producer
- Jean Goldhirsch – assistant producer
- Jerry Schoenbaum – production supervision
- Val Valentin – director of engineering
- Harry Yarmark – engineer
- Murray Laden – photography
