= Stoney End (song) =

Single by Barbra Streisand

from the album Stoney End
- B-side: "I'll Be Home"
- Released: October 1970
- Recorded: 1970
- Studio: United Western Recorders (Las Vegas, NV)
- Genre: Blue-eyed soul; pop-soul
- Label: Columbia
- Songwriter: Laura Nyro
- Producer: Richard Perry

Barbra Streisand singles chronology
"Stout-Hearted Men" (1967)	"Stoney End" (1970)	"Time and Love" (1971)

"Stoney End" is a song written by Laura Nyro and released in February 1967 on her debut album More Than a New Discovery. According to childhood friend Alan Merrill, Nyro originally intended the song, a gospel-inflected uptempo piece, to be performed at a slower pace. The best known recording of Nyro's album version of the song was a hit for Barbra Streisand in 1970.

Streisand recorded "Stoney End" as the title track of her twelfth studio album. Members of the group Fanny provided backing vocals. The song reached number six on the US Billboard Hot 100 in early 1971 and became Streisand's second Top 10 hit. It also reached number two on the US Adult Contemporary chart. In Canada it peaked at number five.

== Chart performance ==
=== Weekly charts ===
Chart (1970–71)	Peak position
Canada RPM Top Singles	5
Canada RPM Adult Contemporary	29
UK Singles Chart	27
US Billboard Hot 100	6
US Billboard Easy Listening	2
US Cash Box Top 100	7

=== Year-end charts ===
Chart (1971)	Rank
Canada	65
US Cash Box	99

== Other versions ==
- The Stone Poneys, which featured Linda Ronstadt, recorded a country-styled version of "Stoney End" for their 1968 album Linda Ronstadt, Stone Poneys and Friends, Vol. III. The song was later included on their 1972 compilation of the same name.
- The song was recorded in 1968 by Peggy Lipton. Her version reached number 121 on the U.S. Billboard Bubbling Under the Hot 100 chart.
- The Blossoms, who sang backing vocals on Lipton's version, first released it in 1967 as the B-side to their single "Wonderful," and then again in 1969 as an A-side single.
- "Stoney End" was recorded by singing duo The Chicks. Their version charted in New Zealand, reaching number 21 in January 1970.
- The 5th Dimension included the song as part of a Nyro tribute medley on their 1971 album The 5th Dimension / Live!!.
- "Stoney End" has also been recorded by Diana Ross, Beth Nielsen Chapman, Maynard Ferguson and Judy Kuhn.
