= List of UK Jazz & Blues Albums Chart number ones of 2017 =

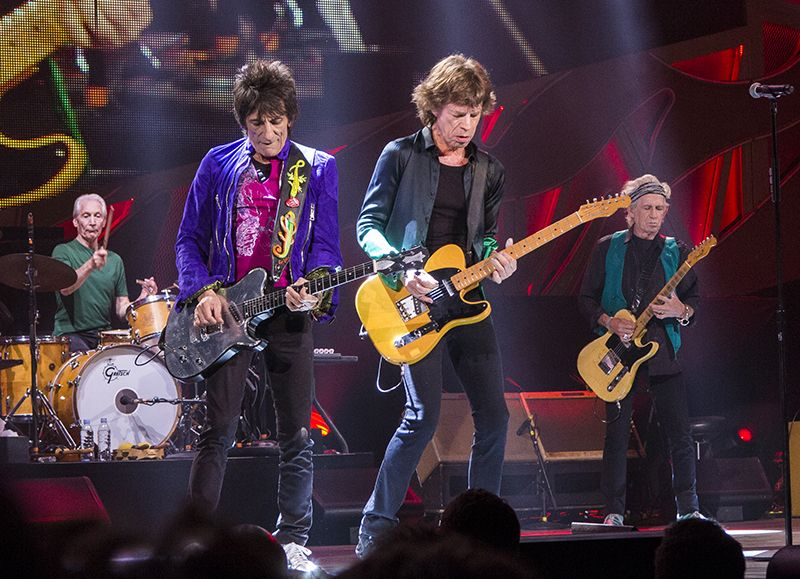
The Rolling Stones spent a total of 25 weeks in 2017 atop the UK Jazz & Blues Albums Chart with Blue & Lonesome.

The UK Jazz & Blues Albums Chart is a record chart which ranks the best-selling jazz and blues albums in the United Kingdom. Compiled and published by the Official Charts Company, the data is based on each album's weekly physical sales, digital downloads and streams. In 2017, 52 charts were published with 13 albums at number one. The first number-one album of the year was Blue & Lonesome by The Rolling Stones, which spent 17 weeks atop the chart between January and April, completing a 21-week run beginning in 2016. The last number-one album of the year was Sir Michael Parkinson presents Our Kind of Music: The Great American Songbook, a various artists compilation.

The most successful album on the UK Jazz & Blues Albums Chart in 2017 was Blue & Lonesome, which spent a total of 25 weeks at number one over the course of five spells. Van Morrison spent eight weeks at number one over two spells of five and three weeks, respectively, with the album Roll with the Punches. Sir Michael Parkinson presents Our Kind of Music: The Great American Songbook was number one for four weeks, while Diana Krall and Joe Bonamassa each spent single three-week spells atop the chart with Turn Up the Quiet and Live at Carnegie Hall: An Acoustic Evening, respectively. Blue & Lonesome finished 2017 as the 97th best-selling album of the year in the UK.

== Chart history ==
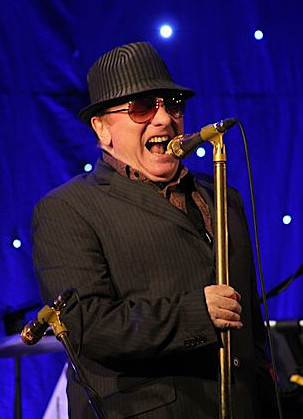
Roll with the Punches by Van Morrison spent eight weeks at number one on the UK Jazz & Blues Albums Chart in 2017.

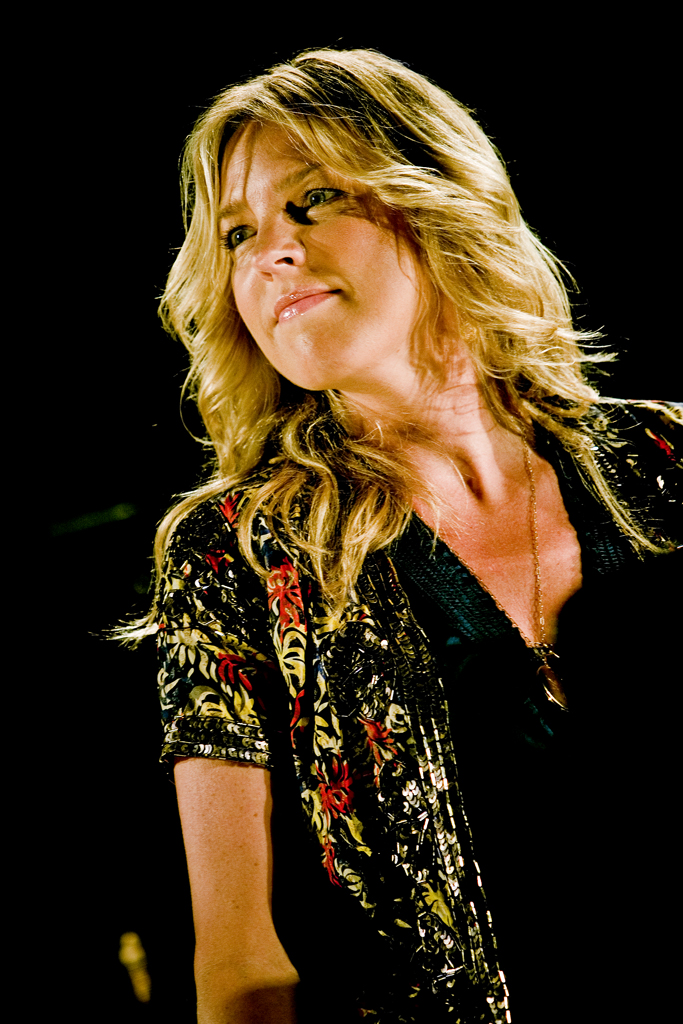
Diana Krall's 13th studio album Turn Up the Quiet spent three consecutive weeks at number one during May 2017.

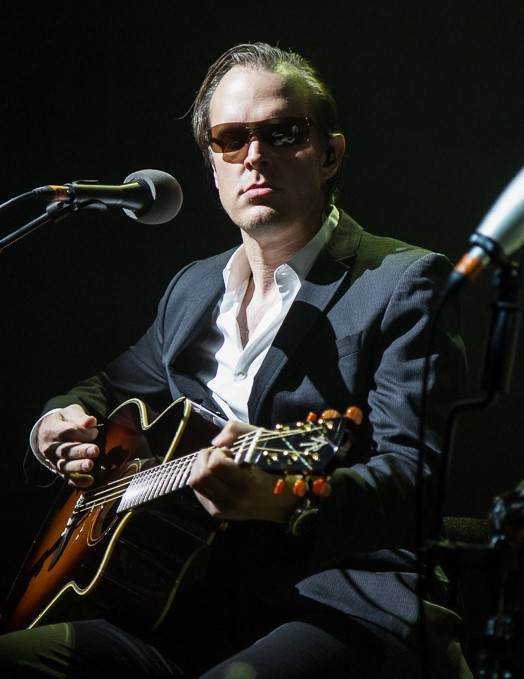
Joe Bonamassa also spent three consecutive weeks atop the UK Jazz & Blues Albums Chart in 2017, with Live at Carnegie Hall: An Acoustic Evening topping three charts in the summer.

Key
†	Indicates best-selling jazz/blues album of 2017

Issue date	Album	Artist(s)	Record label(s)	Ref.
6 January	Blue & Lonesome †	The Rolling Stones	Polydor	
13 January	Blue & Lonesome †	The Rolling Stones	Polydor	
20 January	Blue & Lonesome †	The Rolling Stones	Polydor	
27 January	Blue & Lonesome †	The Rolling Stones	Polydor	
3 February	Blue & Lonesome †	The Rolling Stones	Polydor	
10 February	Blue & Lonesome †	The Rolling Stones	Polydor	
17 February	Blue & Lonesome †	The Rolling Stones	Polydor	
24 February	Blue & Lonesome †	The Rolling Stones	Polydor	
3 March	Blue & Lonesome †	The Rolling Stones	Polydor	
10 March	Blue & Lonesome †	The Rolling Stones	Polydor	
17 March	Blue & Lonesome †	The Rolling Stones	Polydor	
24 March	Blue & Lonesome †	The Rolling Stones	Polydor	
31 March	Blue & Lonesome †	The Rolling Stones	Polydor	
7 April	Blue & Lonesome †	The Rolling Stones	Polydor	
14 April	Blue & Lonesome †	The Rolling Stones	Polydor	
21 April	Blue & Lonesome †	The Rolling Stones	Polydor	
28 April	Blue & Lonesome †	The Rolling Stones	Polydor	
5 May	Robert Cray & Hi Rhythm	Robert Cray, Hi Rhythm Section	Megaforce	
12 May	Turn Up the Quiet	Diana Krall	Verve	
19 May	Turn Up the Quiet	Diana Krall	Verve	
26 May	Turn Up the Quiet	Diana Krall	Verve	
2 June	Blue & Lonesome †	The Rolling Stones	Polydor	
9 June	Blue & Lonesome †	The Rolling Stones	Polydor	
16 June	The Magpie Salute	The Magpie Salute	Eagle	
23 June	Blue & Lonesome †	The Rolling Stones	Polydor	
30 June	Live at Carnegie Hall: An Acoustic Evening	Joe Bonamassa	Provogue	
7 July	Live at Carnegie Hall: An Acoustic Evening	Joe Bonamassa	Provogue	
14 July	Live at Carnegie Hall: An Acoustic Evening	Joe Bonamassa	Provogue	
21 July	Blue & Lonesome †	The Rolling Stones	Polydor	
28 July	Lay It on Down	Kenny Wayne Shepherd	Provogue	
4 August	Blue & Lonesome †	The Rolling Stones	Polydor	
11 August	Blue & Lonesome †	The Rolling Stones	Polydor	
18 August	Blue & Lonesome †	The Rolling Stones	Polydor	
25 August	Blue & Lonesome †	The Rolling Stones	Polydor	
1 September	Art in the Age of Automation	Portico Quartet	Gondwana	
8 September	We're All in This Together	Walter Trout	Provogue	
15 September	Southern Blood	Gregg Allman	Concord	
22 September	We're All in This Together	Walter Trout	Provogue	
29 September	Roll with the Punches	Van Morrison	Exile	
6 October	Roll with the Punches	Van Morrison	Exile	
13 October	Roll with the Punches	Van Morrison	Exile	
20 October	Exile & Grace	King King	Manhaton	
27 October	Roll with the Punches	Van Morrison	Exile	
3 November	Roll with the Punches	Van Morrison	Exile	
10 November	Roll with the Punches	Van Morrison	Exile	
17 November	Roll with the Punches	Van Morrison	Exile	
24 November	Roll with the Punches	Van Morrison	Exile	
1 December	Our Kind of Music: The Great American Songbook	various artists	Union Square	
8 December	Our Kind of Music: The Great American Songbook	various artists	Union Square	
15 December	Our Kind of Music: The Great American Songbook	various artists	Union Square	
22 December	Liquid Spirit	Gregory Porter	Blue Note	
29 December	Our Kind of Music: The Great American Songbook	various artists	Union Square	

== See also ==
- 2017 in British music
