= Portico Quartet (album) =

Studio album by Portico Quartet
- Released: 30 January 2012
- Recorded: August 2011
- Studio: The Fish Factory, London
- Genre: Jazz, ambient, electronic
- Length: 48:15
- Label: Real World
- Producer: Portico Quartet

Portico Quartet chronology
Isla (2009)	Portico Quartet (2012)	Live/Remix (2013)

Portico Quartet is the third studio album by the British group Portico Quartet, released in January 2012.

Professional ratings
Review scores
Source	Rating
All About Jazz	5/5 stars
BBC Music Magazine	5/5 stars
Crack Magazine	19/20
DJ Mag	8.5/10
DIY	4.5/5 stars
Drowned in Sound	4/5 stars
The Guardian	3/5 stars
Mojo	4/5 stars
MusicOMH	4/5 stars
Written in Music	5/5 stars

== Background ==
Portico Quartet is Portico Quartet's third studio album. The album saw a notable development in style, incorporating significant use of electronics and looping compared to the acoustic sound of their first two albums Knee-Deep in the North Sea and Isla.

The group had already been exploring use of electronics, live samples and looping when touring their second album Isla in 2010. This was accelerated when founding member Nick Mulvey left in 2011 to pursue a career as a singer-songwriter. Without their main hang player, the group turned to sampling the hang, as well as using a hybrid mix of electronic and acoustic drums, and electronically treated and looped bowed bass and saxophone lines.

The drummer, Duncan Bellamy, explained the new approach for the track Laker Boo in a contemporary interview:

“The twinkly loop that starts it is actually the hang on the loop station but pitched up a couple of octaves and then I pitched the hang down two octaves so the bass notes on that tune are the hang as well. Then Milo is bowing the bass and I was playing the bass drum and the hi hat - then Jack was playing all the samples on the keyboard - because we are now looking for ways to not always have the saxophone, or the sound of the hang, but it's still in there - and that really felt like a breakthrough.”

The artwork and design for the album was done by the drummer Duncan Bellamy, who has a degree in Fine Art from Central Saint Martins.

== Critical reception ==
Portico Quartet received widespread critical acclaim upon its release. In the UK it charted at #98 the week after its release.

Many reviewers heralded the album's mix of electronic and acoustic sounds, and its use of texture. Music OMH highlighted how it managed to “amalgamate arrangements of modern and traditional instruments to devastating, hypnotic effect” and All About Jazz praised the “greatly expanded sonic palette and stylistic purview”. DIY Magazine called it “one of the first truly remarkable records of 2012…an album which grabs the zeitgeist but still stays true to its roots: callipygously shuffling, painlessly segueing, mingling the darkest rags ‘n’ bones of dubstep, d ‘n’b and off-kilter jazz, all the while interweaving heck loads of new-found textures and electronics. It’s a forward-thinking game-change which feels rich, warm and – quite simply – astounding”.

Other reviewers highlighted the album's production. Crack Magazine said that “Portico Quartet's subtle musical intricacies combined with production values heralding unrivalled clarity have been meshed in a very modern way to create an album of wonderful proportions and balanced minimalism. Stunning.”

The inclusion of a track with vocals - for the first time ever on a Portico Quartet album - divided opinion, however. The Guardian called it “the best track…a triumph”, while Music OMH thought it was “jarring”.

The album came 3rd in Crack Magazine's top 100 albums of 2012 who commented that it was “a glorious success in changing direction…less focused on the hang-drum that defined previous releases, the minimal sparse approach and killer production quality left an indelible mark on our listening.”

== Track listing ==
All songs composed, arranged and performed by Portico Quartet.

1. Window Seat - 3:18
2. Ruins - 5:34
3. Spinner - 4:39
4. Rubidium - 8:44
5. Export to Hot Climates - 1:08
6. Laker Boo - 7:51
7. Steepless ft. Cornelia - 3:57
8. 4096 Colours - 4:35
9. City of Glass - 6:36
10. Trace - 1:53

== EP02 Portico Quartet ==
A separate 2012 EP collected together bonus tracks and outtakes from the Portico Quartet sessions.

1. Coy Carp - 5:24
2. Sock Puppets - 5:47
3. VTOL - 2:31
4. Steepless ft. Cornelia (Remix) - 2:02
5. Train to Montauk - 6:16

== Personnel ==
- Jack Wyllie - Saxophones, electronics, piano, synth
- Duncan Bellamy - Drums, electronics, vocals
- Milo Fitzpatrick - Double bass, electronics
- Keir Vine - Hang, synth
- Produced by Portico Quartet.
- Engineered by Greg Freeman. Mixed by Greg Freeman and Portico Quartet.
- Mastered by Mandy Parnell at Black Saloon.
- Artwork and design by Duncan Bellamy.
