= Daniel Waples =

Handpan musician

- Also known as: Hang in Balance
- Born: Daniel Waples; 1984 (age 41–42); Greater London, England
- Origin: London, England
- Genres: New-age, world music, ambient
- Occupations: Musician; composer; street performer
- Instruments: Handpan; Hang; percussion
- Works: The Hang Drum Project; Hang Playing Hedge Monkeys; Flavio Lopez
- Years active: 2007–present
- Label: Independent
- Website: hanginbalance.com

Daniel Waples (born 1984) is an English handpan musician. He has performed under the stage name Hang in Balance since 2011.

== Early life and education ==
Waples was born in 1984 in Essex and grew up in Greater London, England. He studied Stringed Musical Instrument Technology at Leeds College of Music and Popular Music at Boston College, and later trained in holistic gong therapy and as a community drum-circle facilitator. According to his own account, he first encountered the Hang at a music festival in Lincolnshire in 2005, and purchased his first instrument in 2007, after which he transitioned from guitar to percussion as his primary musical activity.

== Career ==
Waples began performing publicly with the handpan from 2007 onward, working as an itinerant musician and street performer who, by his own account, has rarely remained in any single country for longer than three months. Since adopting the artistic name Hang in Balance in 2011, he has released a series of independently distributed albums and collaborative projects, including MMX1 (2010), Hang & Violin (2011), Crystal Waves (2011), Live at Saint Stephens (2012), Lisn (2014) with collaborators billed as Daniel Waples & Friends, Banyan (2014) and Flow (2014) with The Hang Drum Project, and Sunset in India (2015) with Lars La'Ville. His recordings are distributed primarily through his Bandcamp page on a free or pay-what-you-want basis, with additional releases on streaming platforms.

By the late 2010s his YouTube videos had reportedly accumulated over 40 million views, and he has been described by handpan-focused publications as one of the best-known handpan players internationally. Waples has been a speaker at several TEDx events.

Alongside his solo performances, Waples has collaborated with a wide range of musicians across percussion, strings, electronic music, and vocal traditions, including Danny Cudd (with whom he previously performed as Hang Playing Hedge Monkeys), Davide Swarup, Dave Crowe, the Indian percussion collective Thaalavattam, violinist Flavio Lopez, and James Winstanley in The Hang Drum Project. He has also led handpan workshops and educational initiatives intended to make the instrument more widely accessible to new players.

== Musical style ==
Waples's work is typically categorised within new-age music, world music and ambient music, drawing on the natural tuning and limited pitch set of the handpan to create largely improvisational, meditative pieces. Commentators in the handpan community have described his playing as combining melodic and rhythmic elements in a manner that emphasises the contemplative qualities of the instrument. He has stated that he hopes the handpan can function as a symbol of peace and inward reflection, a theme he has returned to in his TEDx talks.

== Discography ==
Selected independent releases (as Hang in Balance, The Hang Drum Project, and in collaboration): Vesica Picsis (2008, as The Hang Playing Hedge Monkeys), MMX1 (2010), Hang & Violin (2011), Crystal Waves (2011), Live at Saint Stephens (2012), Lisn (2014), Banyan (2014), Lisn Remixed (2014), Flow (2014), and Sunset in India (2015). Earlier EPs include Live in London (2008) and Nail Evaded (2012, with Dave Crowe).
