= Celliers =

Celliers is a surname. Notable people with the surname include:

- Grant Celliers (born 1978), South African cricketer
- Jan Celliers (Johannes Gerhardus Celliers, also Cilliers, 1861–1931), Anglo-Boer War general
- Jan F. E. Celliers (Jan Francois Elias Celliers, also Cilliers, 1865–1940), South African poet, essayist, dramatist, and reviewer

== See also ==
- Cellier
