= Knee-Deep in the North Sea =

Studio album by Portico Quartet
- Released: 5 November 2007
- Recorded: February/August 2007
- Studio: Livingston Studios, London
- Genre: Jazz, world
- Length: 47:47 (67:22 deluxe edition)
- Label: Vortex/Babel Label (Deluxe edition: Real World)
- Producer: Portico Quartet

Portico Quartet chronology
Knee-Deep in the North Sea (2007)	Isla (2009)

Professional ratings
Review scores
Source	Rating
The 405	8.5/10
All About Jazz	4/5 stars
Contactmusic.com	4.5/5 stars
The Guardian	3/5 stars
MusicOMH	4/5 stars

Knee-Deep in the North Sea is Portico Quartet's 2007 debut album. It was nominated for the 2008 Mercury Prize and was Time Out magazine's Jazz, Folk and World album of the year 2007.

== Background ==
The songs for the album were developed by the band while busking outside the National Theatre on London's South Bank. The songs are notable for their use of the Hang, a modern percussion instrument.

The album was originally released in 2007 on the Vortex imprint of Babel Label. In 2011 the album was re-mixed by John Leckie for Real World Records and re-released as a deluxe edition. This included three additional bonus tracks. It was the first time the album was released on vinyl.

The name for the title track comes from when founding member Nick Mulvey attended a rave by the sea in Norfolk.

The album was an important influence on the band Alt-J, who listed it as one of five records they wouldn't exist without. The title track was referenced in their song "Dissolve Me", from the album An Awesome Wave. Joe Newman described it as "the best song of the noughties".

Music from the album is used as the soundtrack to the long-running BBC Radio 4 series Curious Under the Stars.

The artwork and design for the album was done by the drummer, Duncan Bellamy, who has a degree in fine art from Central Saint Martins.

== Critical reception ==
The album was very well received on its release. It was nominated for the 2008 Mercury Prize and was Time Out magazine's Jazz, Folk and World album of the year 2007.

The week after the Mercury Prize awards show, it debuted on the UK Top 200 Albums Chart at #186.

The album was praised for its sense of melody. All About Jazz wrote that it is "mellifluous, exuberant and jaunty, full of catchy tunes and strong hooks" and Drowned in Sound called it "remarkably restrained for a debut record…melodies are carefully thought-out and arranged for the greatest dramatic effect".

Other reviews highlighted the album's atmosphere and combination of influences. MusicOMH said that "where the quartet succeed is in the atmosphere they steadily build up throughout the album, with each track also working on its own as a mini-suite of contrasting moods". The 405 called it "an incredibly diverse album…refreshing to hear such beautifully layered, complex sounds created with instruments alone", and Contactmusic.com described it as "a finely constructed masterpiece…blending influence of contemporary classical and film composers (Philip Glass and Steve Reich et al) and world musical cultures".

== Track listing ==
All tracks composed, arranged and performed by Portico Quartet.

Original release
No.	Title	Length
1.	"News from Verona"	4:24
2.	"(Something's Going Down on) Zavodovski Island"	4:22
3.	"Knee-Deep in the North Sea"	4:52
4.	"Too Many Cooks"	5:32
5.	"Steps in the Wrong Direction"	6:09
6.	"Monsoon: Top to Bottom"	4:14
7.	"The Kon Tiki Expedition"	4:29
8.	"Cittàgazze"	4:47
9.	"Pompidou / Prickly Pear" (Hidden track; includes 3:00 silence)	12:02

Deluxe Edition
No.	Title	Length
1.	"News from Verona"	4:24
2.	"(Something's Going Down on) Zavodovski Island"	4:22
3.	"Knee-Deep in the North Sea"	4:52
4.	"Too Many Cooks"	5:32
5.	"Steps in the Wrong Direction"	6:09
6.	"Monsoon: Top to Bottom"	4:14
7.	"The Kon Tiki Expedition"	4:29
8.	"Cittàgazze"	4:47
9.	"Pompidou"	3:08
10.	"Prickly Pear"	5:47
11.	"All the Pieces Matter" (live)	5:18
12.	"Knee-Deep in the North Sea" (live at Copenhagen Jazz Festival)	6:10
13.	"Steps in the Wrong Direction" (live at Copenhagen Jazz Festival)	8:07

== Personnel ==
=== Portico Quartet ===
- Jack Wyllie – saxophones
- Milo Fitzpatrick – double bass
- Duncan Bellamy – drums, Hang
- Nick Mulvey – Hang

=== Technical personnel ===
- Portico Quartet – production
- Sonny Johns – co-producer, engineer, mixing (original)
  - assisted by Kevin Feazey (The Fierce and the Dead), Simone Filiali
- John Leckie – mixing (deluxe edition)
- Duncan Bellamy – design, artwork, collages
