= Live/Remix =

Live album by Portico Quartet
- Released: 25 March 2013
- Recorded: 2012
- Genres: Jazz, ambient, electronic
- Length: 2:04:11
- Label: Real World
- Producer: Portico Quartet

Portico Quartet chronology
Portico Quartet (2012)	Live/Remix (2013)	Living Fields (2015)

Live/Remix is the fourth album by Portico Quartet, and their first live album. It was released in 2013.

Professional ratings
Review scores
Source	Rating
The Guardian	4/5 stars

== Background ==
Live/Remix is the band's third album to be released on Real World Records. It is a double album.

The first disc features songs from their Isla and Portico Quartet albums, recorded live on tour in 2012.

The second disc features remixes of the studio versions of the songs by a range of artists including Sbtrkt, Luke Abbott and Konx-om-Pax. A remix of Steepless by Capac is included after winning a remix competition the band had run as part of the promotion for their Portico Quartet album.

The artwork and design for the album was done by the drummer Duncan Bellamy, who has a degree in Fine Art from Central Saint Martins.

== Critical reception ==
The album was generally positively received.

John Fordham in The Guardian wrote that it is "a memorable set [that] catches the sweeping big-venue confidence and charisma of Portico Quartet's recent performances with a rare balance of studio-like clarity and audience presence" and takes "their emotional clout to another level".

The Independent praised the live material as "consistently inventive" and Q Magazine commented that "even the most synthesized moments here sound natural and unforced".

== Track listing ==
All tracks composed by Portico Quartet.

Live

1. Window Seat - 4:12
2. City of Glass - 8:51
3. Rubidium / Line - 12:57
4. Ruins - 6:16
5. Clipper - 7:04
6. 4096 Colours - 6:58
7. Laker Boo - 10:10
8. Steepless ft. Cornelia - 8:08
9. Dawn Patrol - 8:17
10. Dawn Patrol alt. ending - 4:56

Remix

1. Window Seat (Will Ward Rmx) - 3:14
2. Line (Sbtrkt more hang Rmx) - 6:03
3. Rubidium (Luke Abbott Rmx) - 4:56
4. Laker Boo (DVA's Hi:Emotions Rmx) - 3:46
5. City of Glass (LV Rmx) - 4:48
6. Steepless (Capac Rmx)
7. 4096 Colours (Konx-om-Pax Rmx) - 8:22
8. Laker Boo (Luca Lozano Rmx) - 7:41
9. Steepless (PQ Edit) - 2:05

== Personnel ==
- Jack Wyllie - Saxophones, electronics, piano, synth
- Duncan Bellamy - Drums, electronics, vocals
- Milo Fitzpatrick - Double bass, electronics
- Keir Vine - Hang, synth
- Produced by Portico Quartet.
- Executive Producer Kerstan Mackness.
- Recorded by Marco Cruneri.
- Mixed by Greg Freeman and Portico Quartet.
