= Hang Massive =

UK new-age music duo

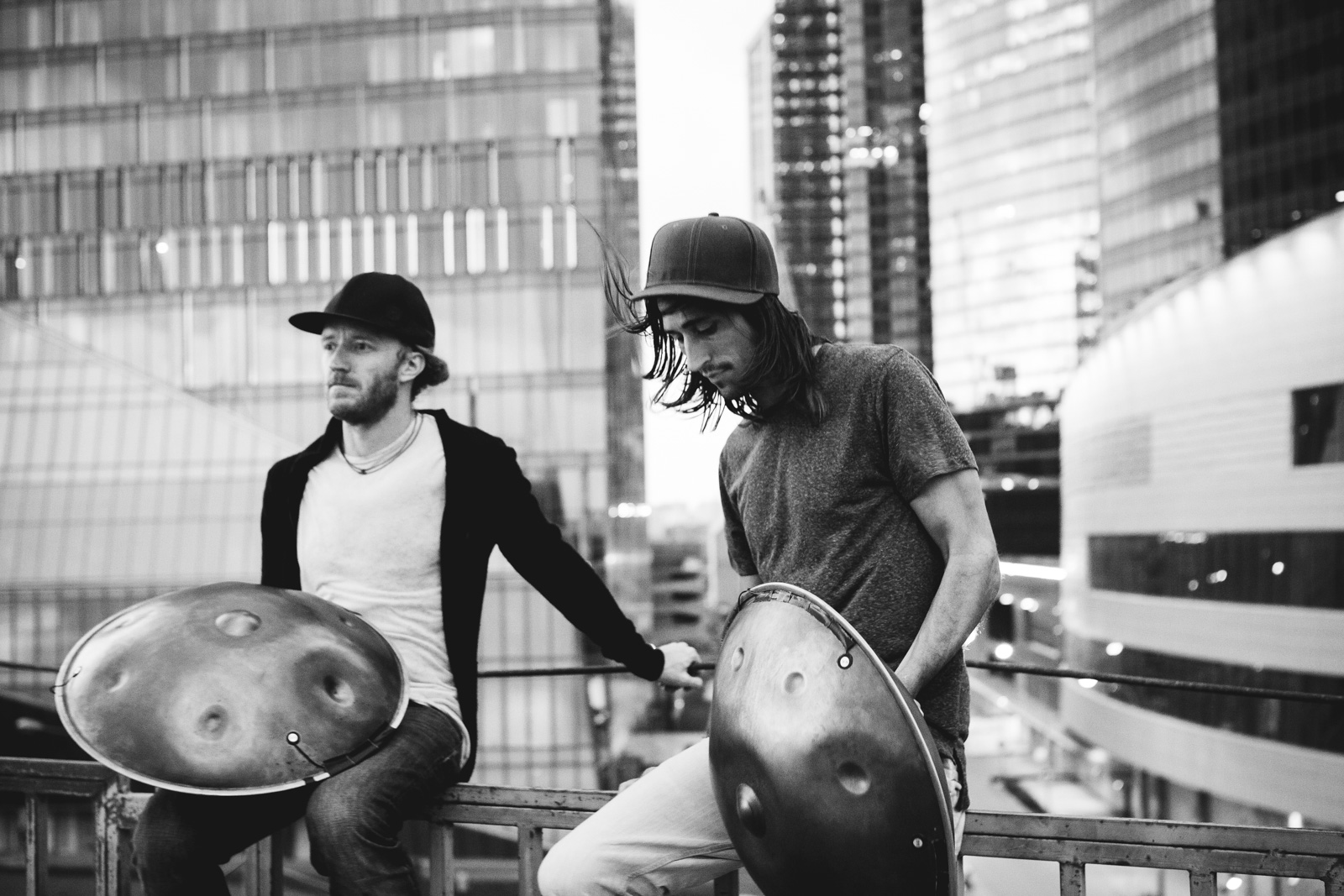
- Danny Cudd (left) and Markus Offbeat (right) in 2016

Background information
- Genres: World music; Ambient
- Years active: 2010–present
- Labels: Hang Music
- Members: Danny Cudd; Markus Offbeat
- Website: Official website

Hang Massive is a world music and ambient music duo consisting of Danny Cudd and Markus Offbeat that play the Hang, a new-age percussion instrument.

== Music career ==
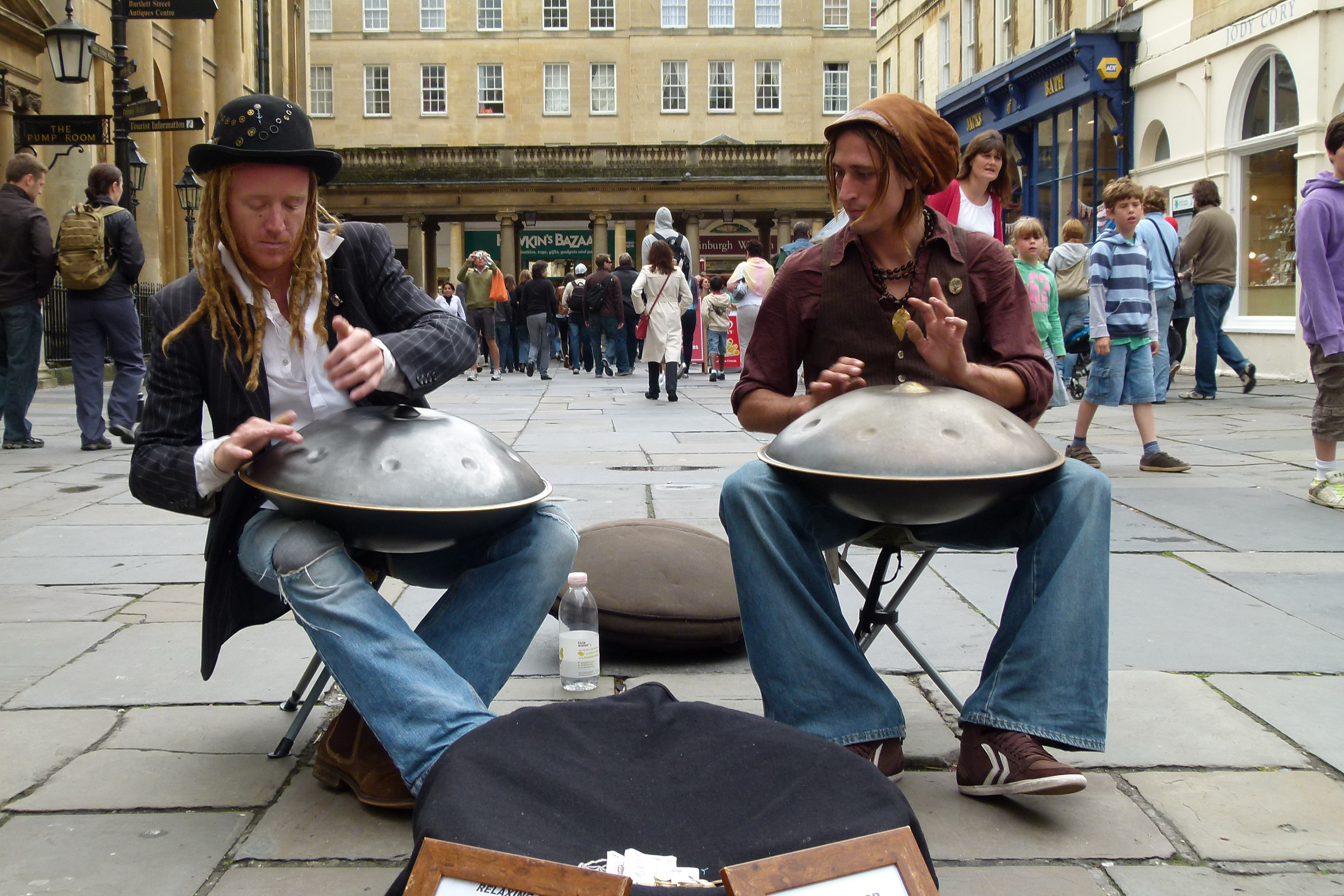
Hang Massive busking on the streets of Bath in 2011

Danny Cudd and Markus “Offbeat" Johansson met in 2010 and formed Hang Massive soon after. They were one of the first acts to become known for playing the Hang, and quickly gained followers for their music videos, becoming "the epitome of the Hang". The duo released its original composition "Once Again" on YouTube in 2011, garnering more than 49 million views as of 2020.

Hang Massive released two live albums and a studio album, Distant Light, in 2016. The duo has toured in Europe, Russia and Australia. Their compositions are both exclusively for the Hang, as well as collaborations with other musicians and vocalists.

== Discography ==
=== Albums ===
- Beats for Your Feet (2012)
- As It Is (2013)
- Distant Light (2016)
- Luminous Emptiness (2018)
