= Alexandre Cellier =

Swiss musician, son of Marcel Cellier

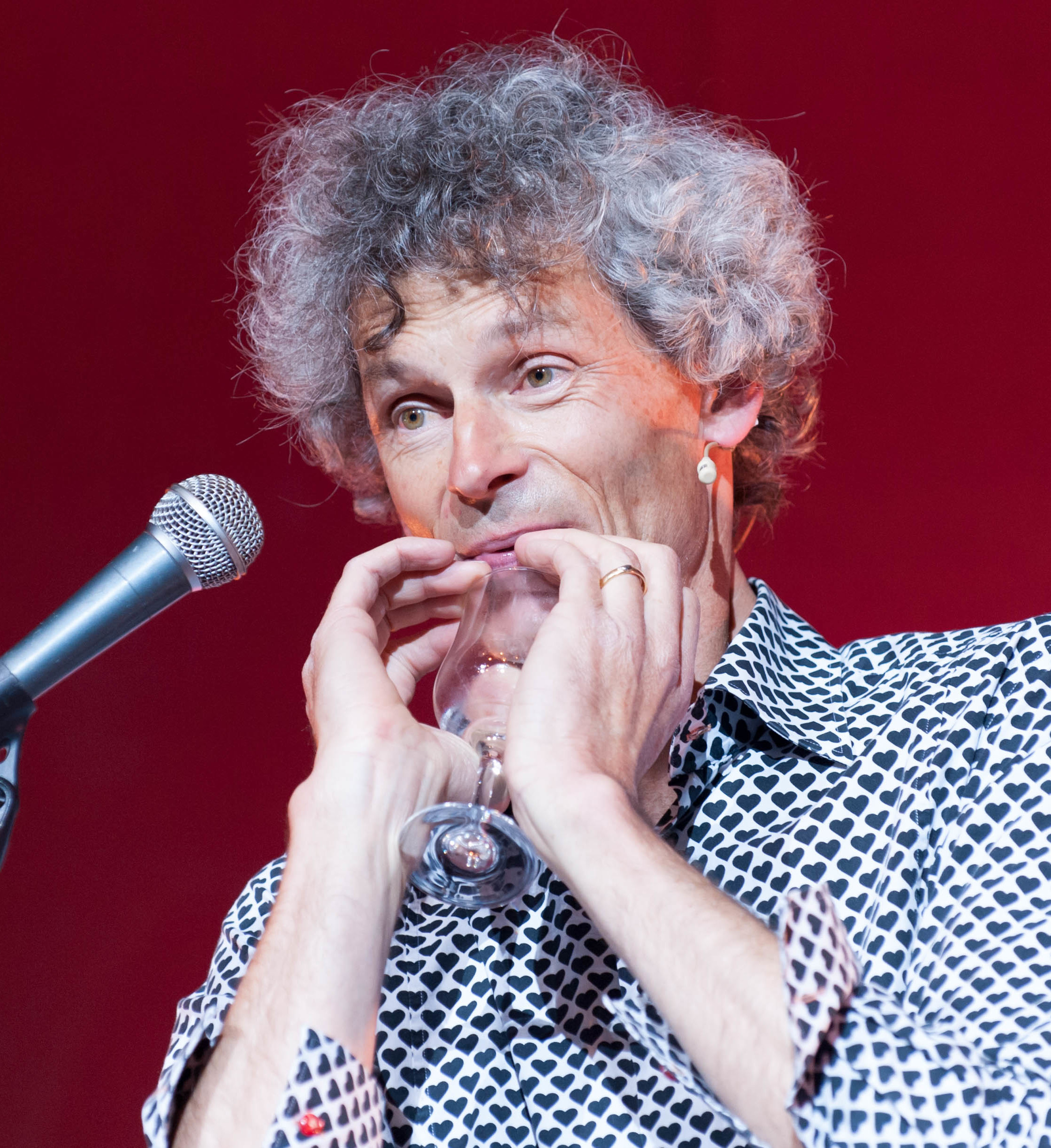
- Alexandre Cellier in 2016

Background information
- Born: 4 December 1966 (age 59)
- Instruments: piano, hang, gubal, fujara, claviola, goblet drum, melodica, harmonica
- Website: http://www.alexcellier.ch/

Alexandre Cellier (born 4 December 1966) is a Swiss musician, son of Marcel Cellier. He has played as a duo with Ion Miu.

== Biography ==
Alexandre Cellier is a Swiss multi-instrument musician and composer, born 4 December 1966 in Lausanne.

As a child, he was surrounded and inspired by the fantastic gypsy music recorded by his parents, Catherine and Marcel Cellier. At fourteen, he developed a passion for jazz piano, improvisation and composition with François Lindemann. He continued his studies at the Lausanne Conservatory with Christian Favre. Since 1982, he has played in various formations and has composed for dance, theatre, storytelling, and film. In 1987, he met Jean Duperrex with whom he composes and improvises for the Ecole de Theatre Diggelman. Together, they created the "Bricomic" show which is still very popular at school plays, private parties and in a variety of unusual settings.

In 1991, at the Montreux Jazz Festival, Alexandre became fascinated by the balafon and djembe played by Les Frères Coulibaly, just before Le Mystère des voix bulgares. After four exploratory journeys, he created a book with CD about percussion and the musical life of Burkina Faso. In 2000 during Trinidad’s carnival, he discovered the Caribbean steel pan, and learnt to play it. A gypsy at heart, he continued his musical training in Brazil, Louisiana, Eastern Europe and Australia. On every occasion the musical Sesame has opened unimaginable doors and allowed magical encounters between the composer, the performer, the presenter, and the music. Alexandre Cellier is involved in different projects with musicians like Antoine Auberson, Annick Rody, Aurelie Tropez, Ion Miu, Evan Christopher, André-Daniel Meylan, Maria de la Paz, William Fierro, Ulrich Herkenhoff, Oliver Grosclaude, Cyril Regamey, Julie Sicre, Jean-Baptiste Buisson, and he also plays solo. Alexandre’s obsession is transforming everyday objects into musical instruments.

== Discography ==
- Compositions 1 (2008)
