= Gubal =

Gubal may refer to:

- Gubal (instrument), a musical instrument
- Byblos, or Gubal, an ancient city in Lebanon
- Strait of Gubal, at the mouth of the Gulf of Suez
