= Ion Miu =

Romanian cimbalom player (born 1955)

- Born: January 21, 1955 (age 71); Titu, Dâmbovița County, Romania
- Genres: Lăutărească music, Music of Romania
- Instrument: Cimbalom
- Label: Electrecord
- Website: www.ionmiu.ro

Ion Miu (born 21 January 1955) is a virtuoso cimbalom player, performing both Romanian folk music and pieces from the classical repertoire.

== Biography ==
Miu was born in 1955 into a musical family in the town of Titu, in Dâmbovița County, Romania. His grandfather Alexandru was a violinist, and his father played the cimbalom. So it was that the four-year-old Ion started to play the cimbalom with his father and by the age of six or seven he was already playing at weddings and bringing home money for the family.

When he was eight years old he played traditional ballads in public in the Lenin Culture House under conductor Traian Tarcola, and over the next two years he toured Europe, playing to packed concert halls in France, Italy, Austria and Germany and acclaimed a child prodigy. In 1966 he played as soloist with the Communist Youth Union orchestra under the baton of the great conductor Ionel Budișteanu. In 1969 he joined the Perinița ensemble, a famous Romanian folk ensemble. He was also part of the ensembles "Ciocârlia" and "Doina Armata".

In 1973 he won first prize at the "Berlin International Festival". Between 1971 and 1980 he was a member of the Ciocârlia orchestra, and in 1980 he won first prize at the "Balkanski Festival", under the baton of Bebe Oprea. From 1981 to 1990 he had many collaborations with folk bands, fiddler music, classical and pop music, including important collaborations with Benone Damian and with the Madrigal Choir. This period marks the beginning of his collaboration with all the great musicians of the 1980s generation, but also the oldest (including Ion Onoriu, Gabi Luncă and Ionică Minune). Between 1991 and 2000 he lived in the city of Toulouse in France, supporting classical and baroque music concerts alongside Christophe Coin with the Capitol Symphony Orchestra under the conductor Michel Plasson. He has been a good friend of Marcel Cellier since touring Switzerland in 1973, and occasionally formed a duo with Alexandre Cellier, Marcel's son.

== Personal life ==
He met Sylvia Udila through performing with her family of musicians, and they were married when he was 19 years old. They have five children, of whom George and Robert play the cimbalom. His father-in-law was the Romanian accordion player Ilie Udila and his brother-in-law is musician George Udilă.

== Awards and prizes ==
- 1971 – first prize at the Berlin International Festival
- 1979 – first prize, diploma and the honour title as "Laureat" in Bucharest
- 1980 – first prize at Balkanski Festival in Novi Sad, conducted by Bebe Oprea

== Songs from his repertoire ==
- Hora lui Leonard
- Horă lăutărească
- Cântec de ascultare
- Hora lui Ion Miu
- Sârbă de la Babadag
- Suită din Ardeal
- Cântarea lui Oale
- Leliță floare
- Măr domnesc
- Blestemat să fii de stele
- Vine cucul de trei zile
- Brâul piteștenilor
- Fantezii ungare
- Cântec bătrânesc
- Moșule, te-aș întreba
- Doina oltului

== Discography ==
- EDC 535: Mari maeștrii muzicanți. Ion Miu - țambal (CD Electrecord 2005)

== Video performances ==
There are many video recordings of his performances on YouTube, including

- Ion Miu – The godfather of the cimbalom: plus part 1 and part 2
- Czardas on YouTube
