= Ethereal in E =

- Born: Adam Foote; Ohio, U.S.
- Occupations: Musician; influencer
- Years active: 2020–present

TikTok information
- Page: Ethereal in E
- Followers: 8.6 million

YouTube information
- Channel: Ethereal in E
- Years active: 2016-present
- Subscribers: 3.36 million
- Views: 1.3 billion
- Musical career
- Genres: Ambient; world
- Instrument: Handpan
- Last updated: 09 February 2026

Adam Foote, mostly known as The Handpan Man or Ethereal in E, is an American musician and social media influencer who is known for his use of the handpan. He is mostly seen playing the instrument in a body of water, often in a humorous or manic style.

Foote's videos have garnered him a combined following of over 11 million people across many social media platforms, particularly TikTok.

== Early life ==
Adam Foote was born in Ohio in 1984. Foote’s passion for percussion instruments began as a young child. He played drums for his church during his childhood, which inspired him to become a professional musician. When he was 11 years old, his father committed suicide as a result of bipolar disorder. Foote attended college and earned a bachelor's degree in psychology at Taylor University and a master's degree in social work from Eastern Washington University.

== Career ==
Foote began his career in professional music on a street corner as a street performer. He used the earnings from his street performing to record his first studio album, Up. He then began performing at public places, including restaurants and festivals. The COVID-19 pandemic hindered Foote's performance opportunities and he began migrating to Facebook to share his music.

Soon after gaining traction on Facebook, he began uploading videos of himself playing the handpan to TikTok in 2020 and quickly gained popularity on the platform. He is mostly seen performing in the water of Lake Coeur d'Alene in Northern Idaho. Foote is also known for singing "happy birthday" songs to viewers.

As of August 2025, Foote has accumulated over 8 million TikTok followers, and 11 million combined followers across multiple platforms.

== Personal life ==
Foote resides near Coeur d'Alene, Idaho. He is married and has one child.

== Discography ==
In addition to his social media presence, Foote has also released two studio albums, one EP, three LPs and one single:

=== Albums ===
Title	Year
Coeur Dreams	2017
Wilderness Therapy	2019

=== EPs and LPs ===
Title	Year
Up.	2017
Rainy Day Rhythms	2025
Songbird Sessions	2025
Whispering Waters	2025

=== Singles ===
Title	Year
Escape to Calmness	2024
Lakeside Lullaby	2024
Lost in Thought	2024
Majesty of the Moment	2024
