= Monument (Portico Quartet album) =

Studio album by Portico Quartet
- Released: 5 November 2021
- Recorded: 2020
- Studio: PQHQ, Leyton, London; Fish Factory, London
- Length: 44:02
- Label: Gondwana
- Producer: Duncan Bellamy; Jack Wyllie

Portico Quartet chronology
Terrain (2021)	Monument (2021)

Professional ratings
Aggregate scores
Source	Rating
Metacritic	75/100
Review scores
Source	Rating
Clash	8/10
MusicOMH	3.5/5 stars
Mojo	4/5 stars
Pitchfork	6.6/10
Uncut	7/10

Monument is the seventh studio album by English instrumental band Portico Quartet. It was released on 5 November 2021 by Gondwana Records.

== Release ==
On 1 September 2021, Portico Quartet announced they were releasing their album Monument, alongside the lead single "Impressions".

== Critical reception ==
Monument was met with "generally favorable" reviews from critics. At Metacritic, which assigns a weighted average rating out of 100 to reviews from mainstream publications, this release received an average score of 75 based on 6 reviews.

== Track listing ==
All tracks are written by Duncan Bellamy and Jack Wyllie.

Monument track listing
No.	Title	Length
1.	"Opening"	2:50
2.	"Impressions"	3:44
3.	"Ultraviolet"	5:12
4.	"Ever Present"	4:48
5.	"Gateway"	1:14
6.	"Monument"	4:40
7.	"A.O.E."	5:35
8.	"Warm Data"	8:16
9.	"Portal"	1:09
10.	"On the Light"	6:28

== Personnel ==
Portico Quartet

- Duncan Bellamy
- Jack Wyllie

Additional musicians

- Francesca Ter-Berg – cello on tracks 1, 7 and 10
- Simmy Singh – violin on track 10

Production

- Mixed by Greg Freeman and Portico Quartet in Berlin, 2020
- Mastered by John Davis at Metropolis
- Design by Veil Projects

== Charts ==
Chart performance for Monument
Chart (2021)	Peak position
UK Independent Albums (OCC)	23
