= Cellier =

Cellier is a French surname meaning "storeroom". Notable people with the surname include:

- Alexandre Cellier (born 1966), Swiss musician, son of Marcel
- Alexandre Eugène Cellier (1883–1968), French organist and composer
- Alfred Cellier (1844–1891), English composer, orchestrator and conductor
- Antoinette Cellier (1913–1981), English actress
- Caroline Cellier (1945–2020), French actress
- Elizabeth Cellier (fl. 1668–1688), English midwife
- Germaine Cellier (1909–1976), French perfumer
- François Cellier (1849–1914), English conductor and composer
- Frank Cellier (actor) (1884–1948), English actor
- Jérôme Cellier (born 1984), French footballer
- Marcel Cellier (1925–2013), Swiss organist and musicologist
- Peter Cellier (born 1928), English actor

== See also ==
- Cellier-du-Luc, commune in Ardèche, France
- Le Cellier, commune in Loire-Atlantique, France
