= Isla (Portico Quartet album) =

Studio album by Portico Quartet
- Released: 19 October 2009
- Recorded: May 2009
- Studio: Abbey Road Studios
- Genre: Jazz
- Length: 47:47
- Label: Real World
- Producer: John Leckie

Portico Quartet chronology
Knee-Deep in the North Sea (2007)	Isla (2009)	Portico Quartet (2012)

Professional ratings
Review scores
Source	Rating
All About Jazz	4.5/5 stars
Financial Times	4/5 stars
Jazzwise	4/5 stars
Mojo	4/5 stars
MusicOMH	4/5 stars
The Observer	4/5 stars
PopMatters	4/5 stars
Q	4/5 stars
Record Collector	4/5 stars

Isla is the second studio album by Portico Quartet, recorded in May 2009 and released on Real World on 19 October 2009. The quartet is composed of saxophonist Jack Wyllie, rhythm section Milo Fitzpatrick and Duncan Bellamy, and percussionist Nick Mulvey.

== Background ==
=== Composition and style ===
Isla is Portico Quartet's second studio album and the follow-up to Knee-Deep in the North Sea, their Mercury Prize-nominated debut album.

The album saw a continuation and refinement of the live acoustic sound developed in Knee-Deep in the North Sea. While those songs were written busking, the songs for Isla were written over a period of four winter months in the band's garden shed. Reflecting this the album has a darker, more introspective tone than its predecessor.

=== Recording ===
Songs for the album were recorded in May 2009 at Abbey Road Studio 2. The album was produced by John Leckie. Electronic overdubs and string arrangements were added at Fish Factory Studios.

=== Artwork ===
Artwork and design for the album was done by the drummer Duncan Bellamy, who has a degree in Fine Art from Central Saint Martins. The cover is a painting by Bellamy.

== Critical reception ==
Isla received widespread international acclaim upon its release.

The Observer highlighted their development in sound and that the album had "exceeded the unreasonable expectations prompted by their impressive debut ... it is better focused and better executed ... genuinely innovative".

Other reviewers noted the albums darker tone compared to its predecessor. Jazzwise commenting that it was a "highly atmospheric album" with a "haunting sonic texture" and "brooding ambience" that "is much more focused in intent". The BBC described a "deepier, scarier world" and Music OMH called it "hypnotic, sultry and mesmorising".

The album was also acclaimed for its fusing of genres. The Washington Post praised this "quietly impassioned set of originals that fuse elements of pop, jazz, classical and electronics music ... wholly original, 21st century experimentalism that stirs both body and soul". Pop Matters wrote that "It's one thing to crisscross musical genres. It's another to make it sound like second nature" and Mojo highlighted the albums "glorious eclecticism ... Isla feeds on Steve Reich mathematics, Radiohead dread, African desert grooves and ECM northern melancholy".

== Track listing ==
All songs composed, arranged and performed by Portico Quartet; string arrangements by Milo Fitzpatrick.

No.	Title	Length
1.	"Paper Scissors Stone"	5:27
2.	"The Visitor"	5:31
3.	"Dawn Patrol"	6:00
4.	"Line"	7:30
5.	"Life Mask (Interlude)"	1:16
6.	"Clipper"	6:31
7.	"Life Mask"	7:17
8.	"Isla"	5:09
9.	"Shed Song (Improv. No 1)"	8:23

- The second printing of the album added "Subo's Mental Meltdown" as an additional track. This was originally a bonus download track.

== EP01 - Abbey Road ==
A separate 2009 EP collected together bonus tracks and outtakes from the Isla sessions.

No.	Title	Length
1.	"The Full Catastrophe"	7:18
2.	"Line (Alternate Take 5)"	8:28
3.	"Cap Gun"	3:09
4.	"Su-Bo's Mental Meltdown"	5:44

== Personnel ==
=== Portico Quartet ===
- Jack Wyllie – saxophones, electronics
- Milo Fitzpatrick – double bass
- Duncan Bellamy – drums, piano
- Nick Mulvey – hang drums, percussion

=== Additional musicians ===
- Mizuka Yamamoto, David Larkin – violin
- Jose Gandia – viola
- Greg Duggan – cello

=== Technical personnel ===
- John Leckie – producer, engineer
- John Leckie, Portico Quartet – mixing
- Steve Rooke – mastering
  - Abbey Road Studios
- Duncan Bellamy – painting, artwork and design
