= Living Fields =

Studio album by Portico
- Released: 30 March 2015
- Recorded: 2014
- Studio: Studio 224, Leyton, London / Iguana Studios, Brixton, London
- Genre: Electronic, ambient, synth-pop
- Length: 36:36
- Label: Ninja Tune
- Producer: Portico

Portico chronology
Live/Remix (2013)	Living Fields (2015)	Art in the Age of Automation (2017)

Living Fields is the first studio album by Portico, released in 2015.

== Background ==
Portico were a band formed by three original members of Portico Quartet. Despite the similarity in name, they considered this to be a new, separate group due to the difference in musical style.

While Portico Quartet are known for their jazz-influenced instrumental music, Living Fields is an electronic experimental pop album featuring guest vocal collaborations.

The overall themes for the album, both musically and lyrically, were drawn from the 2010 documentary Nostalgia for the Light. The band identified this as a means of unifying the issues that they were themselves facing in their own lives:

"The film is about ideas of loss and new beginnings, it's about death and ideas of afterlife, it's about history and time, the beginning of the universe, it's about many many things and deep issues. So it's not about the film necessarily but it's more about the themes and it was a good way to get a thread through the whole album".

The group's musical influences were also thematically tied to the overall concept of the album. They described the music as "somewhere between disintegrating ambiance and pop songs" and identified Tim Hecker, William Basinski, Actress, and Oneohtrix Point Never as major influences on their sound.

The album features guest collaborations with three singers, all of whom the band had a personal connection with: Joe Newman from Alt-J, Jamie Woon, and Jono McCleery. The band sent the documentary Nostalgia for the Light to them to guide their lyrics:

"We sent that to each of them and each of them seemed to write about a different aspect of what the film kind of evoked in them. Some had ideas about how we are all bound atomically to the universe in a very scientific but also philosophical way. And then other ones wrote about searching for their lost lovers and family, this idea of loss. Others had ideas about the road that we go down on when we pass away".

Artwork and design for the album was done by the drummer Duncan Bellamy, who has a degree in Fine Art from Central Saint Martins. The front cover image is a sculpture by Henri Gaudier-Brzeska.

== Critical reception ==
Professional ratings
Review scores
Source	Rating
AllMusic	3.5/5 stars
DMCWorld Magazine	4/5 stars
Drowned in Sound	4/5 stars
The Line of Best Fit	4/5 stars
Noisey	4/5 stars
Mojo	4/5 stars
MusicOMH	3.5/5 stars
PopMatters	4/10
The Skinny	4/5 stars
The Times	4/5 stars

Living Fields was generally positively received on its release. It was listed as one of Mojo magazine's top 10 electronica albums of 2015.

Several reviewers highlighted the album's atmosphere and textures. The Line of Best Fit wrote that with its "Bleeding sounds so that instruments never quite feel entirely synthetic nor material, it's a very British electronic record, with its echoing clatters and restless lack of pattern to tracks [...] brooding throughout, dark by its production and vocals, and its messages". It also said that the album "achieves that rare feat of giving electronic music a beating heart, and is without a doubt one of the best records of its class this year". The Skinny called it "A moody, elegant record with flickers of shiny, shiny pop [... it] navigates a tricky path between the purely atmospheric and the distinctly rhythmic" and DMCWorld praised the "widescreen, cinematic soundscapes that really stretch the music out, wringing maximum tension and emotion from their harmonies...Moody and rather magnificent".

Some critics however felt that the album lacked energy and did not stand out sufficiently. PopMatters wrote that the album "feels lifeless [...] These songs are ethereal to a fault, unable to gain a foothold in memory" and MusicOMH said that "with their synth textures and post-dubstep influences, they don't sound all that different from much of the pop music being made at the moment".

== Track listing ==
1. "Living Fields" (featuring Jono McCleery) – 3:11
2. "101" (featuring Joe Newman) – 4:45
3. "Where You Are" (featuring Jono McCleery) – 1:41
4. "Atacama" (featuring Joe Newman) – 4:59
5. "Colour Fading" (featuring Jono McCleery) – 4:51
6. "Dissolution" – 1:29
7. "Bright Luck" (featuring Jono McCleery) – 3:45
8. "Brittle" (featuring Joe Newman) – 5:37
9. "Memory of Newness" (featuring Jamie Woon) – 6:14

=== Bonus CD ===
A separate CD collected together bonus tracks and outtakes from the Living Fields sessions.

1. "Void" – 2:00
2. "Into a Vision" (featuring Jono McCleery) – 3:58
3. "Where You Are" (alt version) (featuring Jono McCleery) – 4:23
4. "Distant Plane" – 1:25

== Personnel ==
- Portico – recording, composition, mixing and production
  - Duncan Bellamy – artwork, photography and design
- Jono McCleery – vocals
- Joe Newman – vocals
- Jamie Woon – vocals
- Gus Unger-Hamilton – additional background vocals ("Brittle")
- Mandy Parnell – mastering (at Black Saloon)
