= Portico Quartet =

English instrumental group

- Portico Quartet's logo as of 2019

Background information
- Also known as: Portico (2014–2017)
- Origin: London, England
- Genres: Jazz, ambient, electronic
- Years active: 2005–present
- Labels: Babel Label; Real World; Ninja Tune; Gondwana Records
- Members: Duncan Bellamy; Jack Wyllie
- Past members: Milo Fitzpatrick; Nick Mulvey; Keir Vine
- Website: porticoquartet.com

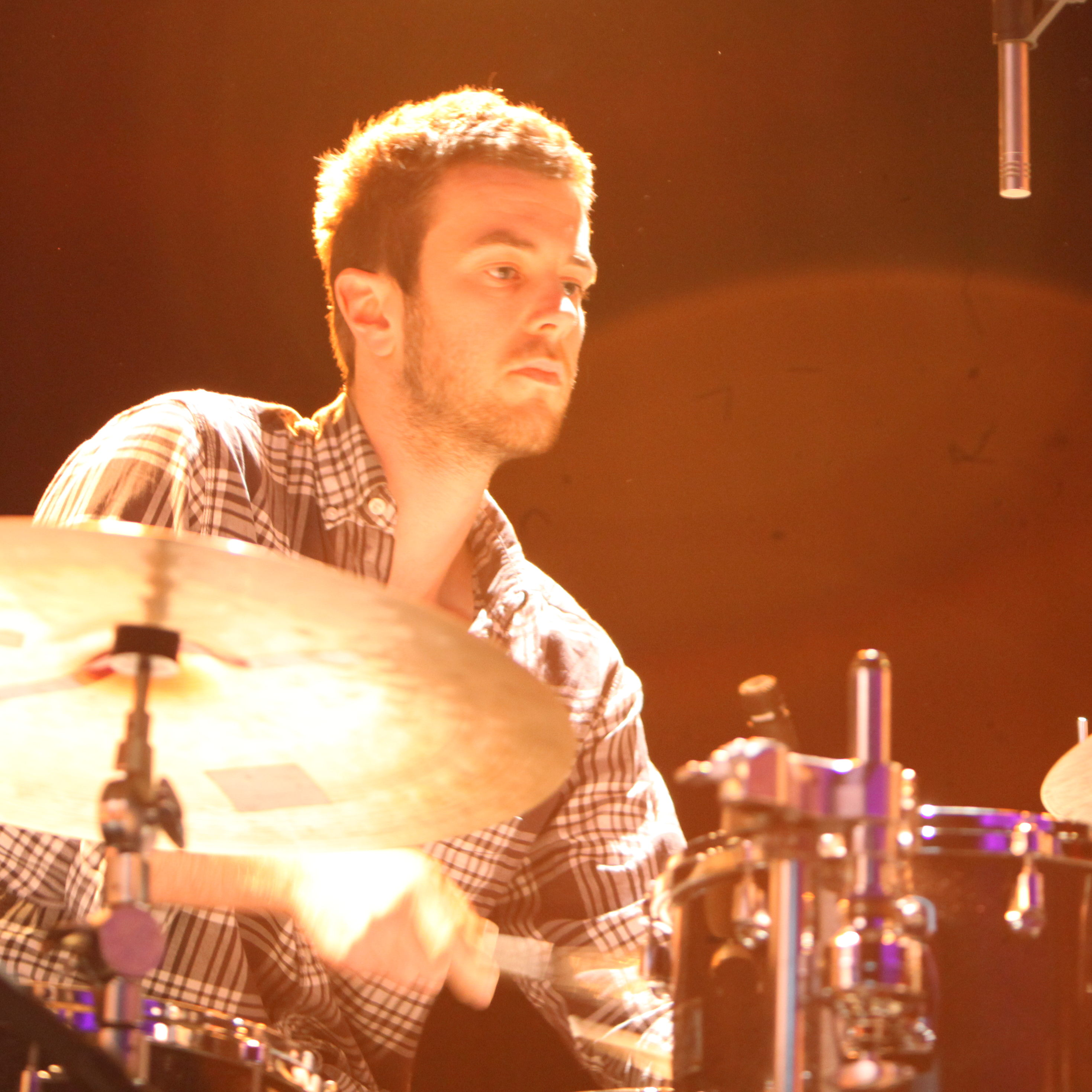
Duncan Bellamy of Portico Quartet, playing at Cully Jazz Festival, 2011

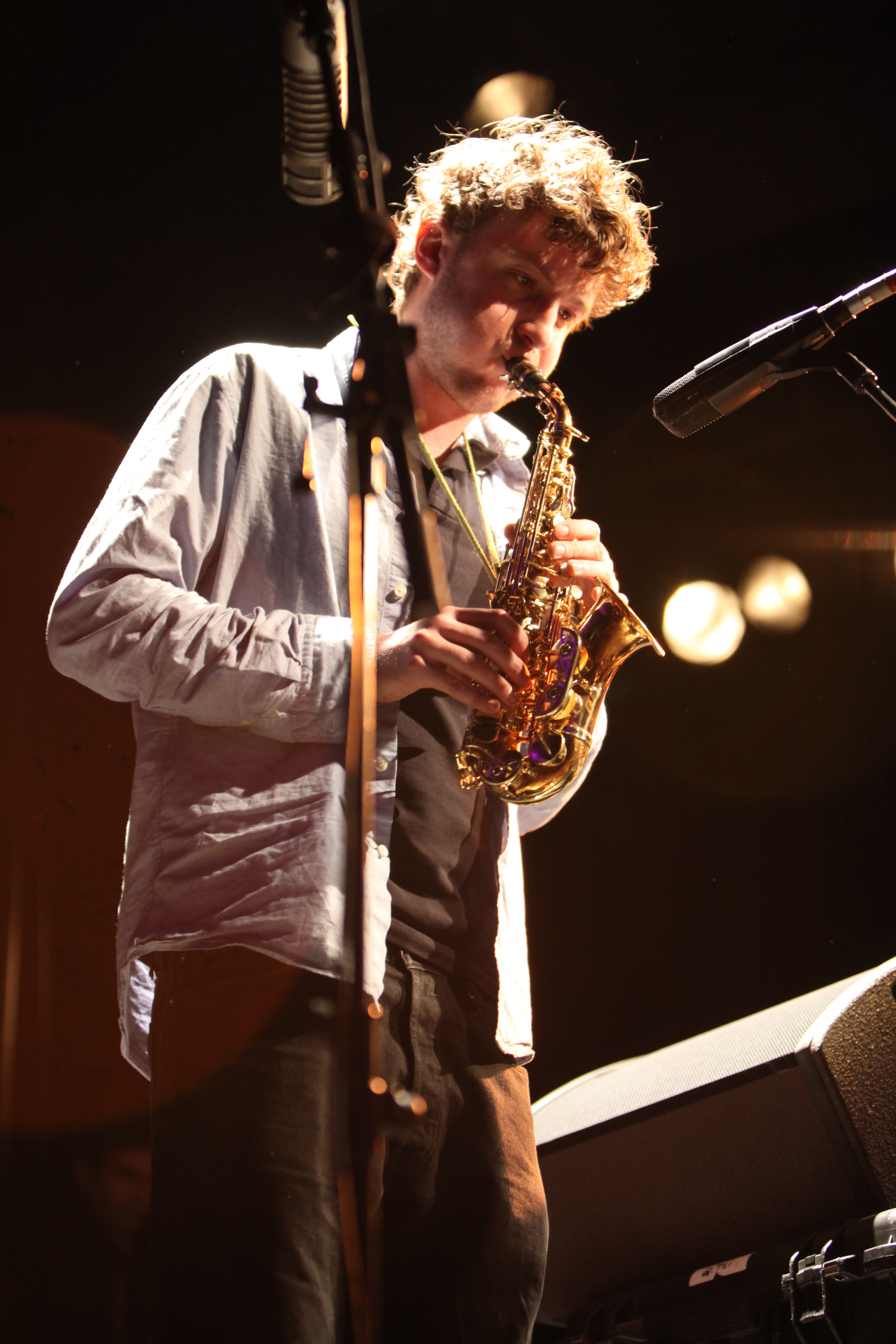
Jack Wyllie of Portico Quartet, playing at Cully Jazz Festival, 2011

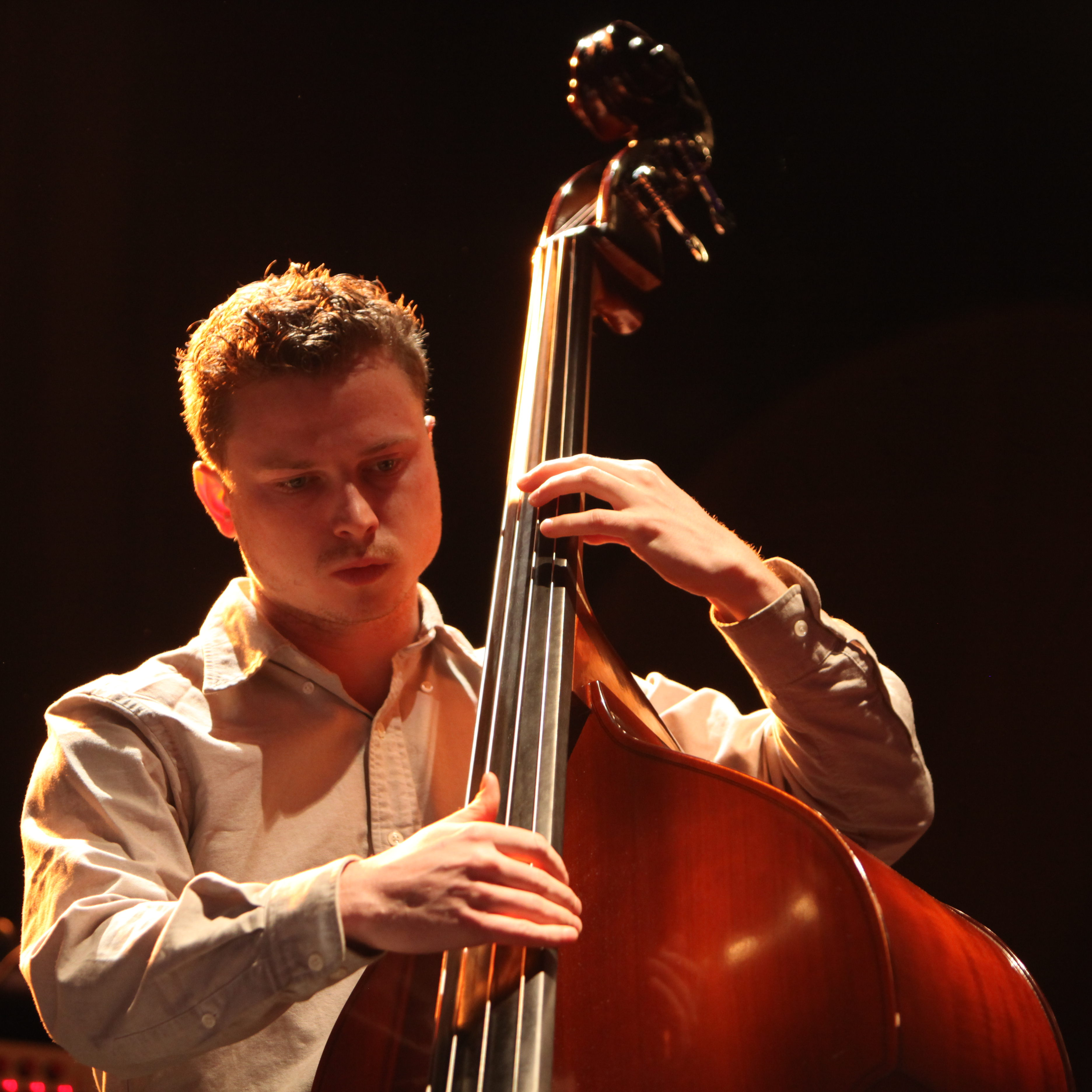
Milo Fitzpatrick of Portico Quartet, playing at Cully Jazz Festival, 2011

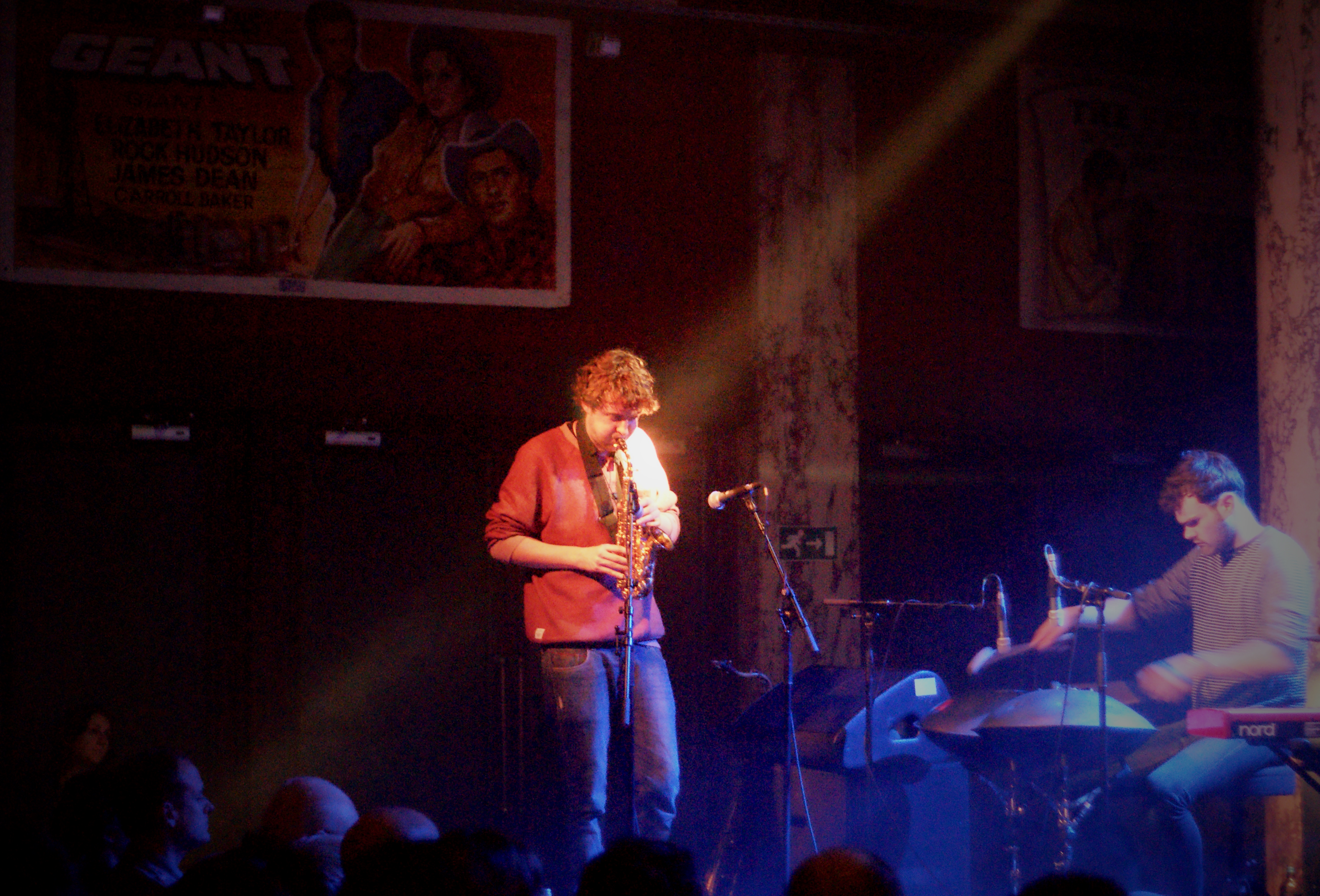
Jack Wyllie & Keir Vine with Portico Quartet, performing in 2012 at „De Roma", a cultural centre in Antwerp, Belgium

Portico Quartet are an instrumental band from London, United Kingdom. They are known for their use of the Hang, a modern percussion instrument. Their debut album, Knee-Deep in the North Sea, was nominated for the 2008 Mercury Prize and was Time Out's Jazz, Folk and World album of the year 2007.

The group consists of Duncan Bellamy (drums and electronics), Jack Wyllie (saxophones and keyboards), Milo Fitzpatrick (electric and double bass), and Keir Vine (keyboards).

Their name comes from when one of their early gigs was rained out and they ended up playing under a portico.

All of the group's album covers, artwork and graphic design is done by the drummer, Bellamy, who has a degree in fine art from Central Saint Martins.

== History ==
The band was formed from two groups of childhood friends (Jack Wyllie and Milo Fitzpatrick from Southampton, and Duncan Bellamy and Nick Mulvey from Cambridge) who met in 2005 while studying at university in London. Bellamy and Mulvey had originally spotted the hang instrument at the WOMAD festival.

The group initially honed their style by busking regularly outside the National Theatre on London's South Bank. At the time, they all lived together in a shared house with Jamie Woon. They were part of the One Taste Collective (with artists including Kae Tempest, Little Dragon and Woon).

In 2007, they signed to be the first release on the Vortex imprint of Babel Label. Their debut album, Knee-Deep in the North Sea, was nominated for the 2008 Mercury Prize and was Time Out's Jazz, Folk and World music album of the year 2007.

They subsequently signed to Peter Gabriel's Real World Records and released two albums: 2009's Isla and 2012's self-titled Portico Quartet.

In 2011 founding member Mulvey left the group to pursue a career as a singer-songwriter. He was replaced by Keir Vine.

In 2014 the three remaining founder members signed to Ninja Tune under the name Portico and released the album Living Fields. They considered this to be a new group and radically changed their musical style to experimental electronic pop.

In 2017 the band signed with Gondwana Records and released their fourth studio album as Portico Quartet—Art in the Age of Automation—which reached no. 1 in the UK jazz chart.

Their fifth studio album, Memory Streams, was released in 2019.

In 2021, a remixed version of the band's song "Double Helix" appeared on the podcast Storybound alongside author Chuck Klosterman.

== Musical style ==
The group predominantly makes modern instrumental music. They are known for the use of the Hang, a modern percussion instrument. Their main influences are jazz, ambient and electronic music.

The band's first two albums are largely acoustic recordings, reflecting their origins as a live busking band. These are based around the hang, double bass and drums, with the saxophone playing the melody line.

Mulvey's departure from the band in 2011 heralded a notable change in style. The group had already been exploring use of electronics, live samples and looping when touring their second album Isla in 2010. Without their main hang player, for their self-titled third studio album Portico Quartet the group turned to sampling the hang, as well as using a hybrid mix of electronic and acoustic drums, and electronically treated and looped bowed bass and saxophone lines.

The Living Fields album featured another change in style, focused on experimental electronic pop music rather than instrumental compositions. Reflecting this, the group chose to release it under the name Portico rather than Portico Quartet, considering it to be a separate band.

== Band members ==
=== Current ===
- Duncan Bellamy – drums (2005–present), Hang (2005–2011, 2020–present), keyboards (2009–2011, 2020–present), percussion (2009–2011), electronics (2011–present), vocals (2011–2012, 2020–present), bass (2020–present), vibraphone (2020–present)
- Jack Wyllie – soprano saxophone, alto saxophone (2005–2014, 2017–present), electronics (2009–present), keyboards (2011–present)

=== Past ===
- Milo Fitzpatrick – double bass (2005–2014, 2017–2020), electronics (2011–2020), bass (2014–2017)
- Nick Mulvey – Hang (2005–2011), percussion (2009–2011)
- Keir Vine – Hang (2011–2014, 2017–2020), keyboards (2011–2014, 2017–2020), percussion

== Discography ==
- Knee-Deep in the North Sea (2007)
- Isla (2009)
- Portico Quartet (2012)
- Live/Remix (2013)
- Living Fields (as Portico, 2015)
- Art in the Age of Automation (2017)
- Memory Streams (2019)
- Terrain (2021)
- Monument (2021)
