= Grant Celliers =

South African cricketer (born 1978)

Personal information
- Born: 13 December 1978 (age 47); Ermelo, Mpumalanga, South Africa
- Source: Cricinfo, 17 April 2017

Grant Celliers (born 13 December 1978) is a South African cricketer. He played twelve first-class matches for Cambridge University Cricket Club and North West between 2001 and 2006.

== See also ==
- List of Cambridge University Cricket Club players
