= Live at Carnegie Hall: An Acoustic Evening =

Live album by Joe Bonamassa
- Released: June 23, 2017
- Recorded: January 21 and 22, 2016
- Venue: Stern Auditorium, Carnegie Hall (New York City)
- Genre: Blues rock
- Length: 1:33:24
- Label: J&R Adventures
- Producer: Kevin Shirley

Joe Bonamassa live album chronology
Live at the Greek Theatre (2016)	Live at Carnegie Hall: An Acoustic Evening (2017)	British Blues Explosion Live (2018)

Live at Carnegie Hall: An Acoustic Evening is the fifteenth live album and video by American blues-rock musician Joe Bonamassa. Produced by Kevin Shirley, it was released on June 23, 2017 by J&R Adventures. The album documents Bonamassa's two performances at the Stern Auditorium, Carnegie Hall in New York City on January 21 and 22, 2016. It is the guitarist and vocalist's second all-acoustic live collection, following 2013's An Acoustic Evening at the Vienna Opera House.

For his performances at the Carnegie Hall, Bonamassa performed with a number of musicians in addition to his regular backing band, including Chinese-American cellist and erhuist Tina Guo, American mandolin and banjo player Eric Bazilian, and Egyptian percussionist Hossam Ramzy. The album reached number 64 on the US Billboard 200 and number 30 on the UK Albums Chart, while the video topped the Billboard Music Video Sales chart and reached number 2 on the UK Music Video Chart.

== Background and release ==
During January 2016, Joe Bonamassa completed a short acoustic tour in the United States, including regular band members Anton Fig (drums) and Reese Wynans (piano), alongside Chinese-American cellist and erhuist Tina Guo, American mandolin and banjo player Eric Bazilian, Egyptian percussionist Hossam Ramzy, and Australian backing vocalists Mahalia Barnes, Juanita Tippins and Gary Pinto. The tour ended with two performances at New York City's Carnegie Hall on January 21 and 22, which were described in the tour's press release as being the recognition of one of Bonamassa's "childhood dreams". Speaking to Guitarist magazine about the shows, Bonamassa recalled that "Carnegie was a life-long dream because I was a born New Yorker ... [and] Carnegie was this mystical place, you know? They don't run many non-classical concerts through there. So to make it there and to do two nights with this incredible nine-piece acoustic band really means something to me and it was great."

On April 19, 2017, it was announced that the two Carnegie Hall shows would be released as a live album and video entitled Live at Carnegie Hall: An Acoustic Evening. Bonamassa differentiated the album from his first acoustic release, 2013's An Acoustic Evening at the Vienna Opera House, by explaining that "Where Vienna was four-piece stripped down as bare bones as it gets, this was an ensemble ... It was a big band". Prior to the album's release, videos were shared of several performances from the shows, including Blues Deluxe song "Woke Up Dreaming", Black Country Communion track "Song of Yesterday", and Blues of Desperation songs "This Train", "Drive" and "The Valley Runs Low". Live at Carnegie Hall: An Acoustic Evening was released on June 23, 2017 on double CD, vinyl, DVD and Blu-ray formats. Three songs from the album registered on the US Billboard Blues Digital Songs chart upon the album's release: Bette Midler cover "The Rose" at number 7, "Song of Yesterday" at number 10 and "This Train" at number 12.

== Reception ==
=== Commercial ===
Live at Carnegie Hall: An Acoustic Evening debuted on the US Billboard 200 at number 64. The album also topped the Blues Albums chart, and reached number 5 on the Independent Albums chart, number 10 on the Top Rock Albums chart, number 21 on the Tastemaker Albums chart, and number 23 on the Digital Albums chart. In the UK, the album reached number 30 on the UK Albums Chart and topped the UK Jazz & Blues Albums Chart, as well as reaching number 18 on the Scottish Albums Chart. Elsewhere, it reached number 8 in Germany, the top 30 in Austria, Switzerland, the Flanders region of Belgium and the Netherlands, number 55 in the Wallonia region of Belgium, and number 109 in France. It also registered on the Australian Jazz & Blues Albums Chart at number 6. The album's video release topped the charts in the US, Austria, the Netherlands and Switzerland, reached number 2 in the UK, and reached number 3 in Sweden and both regions of Belgium.

=== Critical ===
Professional ratings
Review scores
Source	Rating
Acoustic	5/5 stars
AllMusic	3.5/5 stars
Classic Rock	3.5/5 stars
Record Collector	4/5 stars

Media response to Live at Carnegie Hall: An Acoustic Evening was generally positive. Acoustic magazine awarded it a maximum rating of five stars, hailing it as "a treasure trove for any blues and acoustic fan" and praising the performances of the band's "world-class musicians". Stephen Thomas Erlewine for AllMusic claimed that the album "stands out from his annual electric extravaganzas, sounding a little more subdued and relaxed than its companions", adding that "The songs aren't so much reinterpreted as given a gentler touch, and in a catalog filled with similar feeling records, that distinction is welcome". Classic Rock magazine's Hugh Fielder suggested that the "cold and austere" acoustics of the venue would make a listener "wish for more warmth and passion", but praised the performances of Bonamassa and fellow band members Guo, Ramzy and Wynans. Fielder complained that "The set sags a little in the middle", but added that "that's only in comparison to the full-on focus at the start and the exhilaration towards the end". Reviewing the album for Record Collector, Tim Jones praised Bonamassa as being "on fiery fret form".

== Track listing ==
Disc one
No.	Title	Writer(s)	Length
1.	"This Train"	Joe Bonamassa; James House	5:24
2.	"Drive"	Bonamassa; House	6:18
3.	"The Valley Runs Low"	Bonamassa; House	4:36
4.	"Dust Bowl"	Bonamassa	4:55
5.	"Driving Towards the Daylight"	Bonamassa; Danny Kortchmar	6:20
6.	"Black Lung Heartache"	Bonamassa	5:58
7.	"Blue and Evil"	Bonamassa	5:26
8.	"Livin' Easy"	Bonamassa; Jerry Flowers; Jeffrey Steele	5:04
9.	"Get Back My Tomorrow"	Bonamassa; Flowers; Steele	5:12
Total length:			49:13

Disc two
No.	Title	Writer(s)	Length
10.	"Mountain Time"	Bonamassa; Will Jennings	6:27
11.	"How Can a Poor Man Stand Such Times and Live?" (Blind Alfred Reed cover)	Blind Alfred Reed	8:04
12.	"Song of Yesterday" (originally recorded by Black Country Communion)	Bonamassa; Glenn Hughes; Kevin Shirley	9:20
13.	"Woke Up Dreaming"	Bonamassa; Jennings	6:14
14.	"Hummingbird"	Leon Russell	7:12
15.	"The Rose" (Bette Midler cover)	Amanda McBroom	6:54
Total length:			44:11

== Personnel ==
- Joe Bonamassa – guitar, vocals
- Anton Fig – drums
- Reese Wynans – piano
- Tina Guo – cello, erhu
- Eric Bazilian – mandolin, banjo, saxophone
- Hossam Ramzy – percussion
- Mahalia Barnes – vocals
- Juanita Tippins – vocals
- Gary Pinto – vocals
- Kevin Shirley – production, mixing
- Eric Roa – recording
- Jared Kvitka – engineering
- Bob Ludwig – mastering
- George Ghanem – cover design
- Dale Voelker – package design
- Christie Goodwin – photography

== Chart positions ==
Live album

Chart (2017)	Peak position
Australian Jazz & Blues Albums (ARIA)	6
Austrian Albums (Ö3 Austria)	22
Belgian Albums (Ultratop Flanders)	27
Belgian Albums (Ultratop Wallonia)	55
Dutch Albums (MegaCharts)	29
French Albums (SNEP)	109
German Albums (Offizielle Top 100)	8
Hungarian Albums (MAHASZ)	39
Scottish Albums (OCC)	18
Swiss Albums (Schweizer Hitparade)	23
UK Albums (OCC)	30
UK Jazz & Blues Albums (OCC)	1
UK Physical Albums (OCC)	15
UK Vinyl Albums (OCC)	18
US Billboard 200	64
US Blues Albums (Billboard)	1
US Digital Albums (Billboard)	23
US Independent Albums (Billboard)	5
US Tastemaker Albums (Billboard)	21
US Top Rock Albums (Billboard)	10

Video album

Chart (2017)	Peak position
Austrian Music Videos (Ö3 Austria)	1
Belgian Music Videos (Ultratop Flanders)	3
Belgian Music Videos (Ultratop Wallonia)	3
Dutch Music Videos (MegaCharts)	1
Swedish Music Videos (Sverigetopplistan)	3
Swiss Music Videos (Schweizer Hitparade)	1
UK Music Videos (OCC)	2
US Music Video Sales (Billboard)	1

Charted songs

Title	Chart (2017)	Peak position
"The Rose"	US Blues Digital Songs (Billboard)	7
"Song of Yesterday"	US Blues Digital Songs (Billboard)	10
"This Train"	US Blues Digital Songs (Billboard)	12
