= Benone Damian =

Benone Damian (1928–2012) was a violin player from Romania. He was born in Intorsura Buzaului, an ancient place. His first recordings were with folk music in 1951.

Initially he trained as a classical violinist. After graduating from the Music Conservatoire, he was appointed the first violinist of the “George Enescu” Philharmonic's Orchestra in Bucharest, where he performed several times as soloist of this orchestra, and he debuted in Paris in 1965. He left it in 1969 and concentrated on folklore music. Later he successfully toured in Switzerland, in 1969 with another Romanian ensemble. Damian decided to found his own orchestra after all this success. He was very active in Europe, U.S.A., and Canada. Electrecord has produced many LPs of his music.
