= Art in the Age of Automation =

Studio album by Portico Quartet
- Released: 25 August 2017
- Recorded: December 2016 – January 2017
- Studio: Fish Factory Studios, London
- Genre: Jazz; ambient; electronic
- Length: 50:37
- Label: Gondwana
- Producer: Portico Quartet

Portico Quartet chronology
Living Fields (2015)	Art in the Age of Automation (2017)	Untitled (AITAOA #2) (2018)

Professional ratings
Review scores
Source	Rating
All About Jazz	4.5/5 stars
Blues & Soul	5/5 stars
DJ Mag	4/5 stars
Drowned in Sound	4/5 stars
London Evening Standard	5/5 stars
Mojo	4/5 stars
Record Collector	4/5 stars
Uncut	4/5 stars

Art in the Age of Automation is the fourth studio album by the English instrumental group Portico Quartet, released on 25 August 2017.

== Track listing ==
All songs written by Duncan Bellamy and Jack Wyllie

1. Endless – 4:27
2. Objects to Place in a Tomb – 5:27
3. Rushing – 6:19
4. Art in the Age of Automation – 4:55
5. S/20005S – 0:37
6. A Luminous Beam – 6:02
7. Beyond Dialogue – 6:42
8. RGB – 4:32
9. Current History – 6:07
10. Mercury Eyes – 1:36
11. Lines Glow – 3:49

== Untitled (AITAOA #2) ==
On 9 March 2018, the band announced the release of a companion piece to Art in the Age of Automation, called Untitled (AITAOA #2) and featuring tracks recorded during the Art in the Age of Automation sessions. It came out on 27 April.

1. Double Space – 2:53
2. Index – 3:58
3. Unrest – 5:13
4. In Where We Meet – 1:16
5. View from a Satellite – 5:20
6. Celestial Wife – 3:58
7. Reflected in Neon – 2:22
8. Dust – 4:46
9. Berlin – 2:02

== Personnel ==
- All instruments played by Portico Quartet, except strings on 1, 2, 4, 6, and 11, performed by Francesca Ter-Burg and Anisa Arslanagic, and additional bass on 2 and 7 by Tom Herbert.
- Mixed by Portico Quartet and Greg Freeman, assisted by Beau Blaise
- Mixed at Vox-Ton Studios, Berlin, and Mokik Studio, Berlin, February 2017
- Mastered by Norman Nitzsche, CALYX Mastering, Berlin, May 2017
- Artwork by Duncan Bellamy for veilprojects.com

== Charts ==
Chart (2017)	Peak position
Scottish Albums (OCC)	80
