= Gubal (instrument) =

Percussive musical instrument

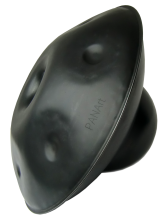
Gubal

The Gubal is a musical instrument developed by the Swiss company PANArt Hang Manufacturing Ltd.. It is a vessel made of PANArt's patented Pang, a deep drawn sheet steel permeated by iron nitride needles. Pang was developed by PANArt for steelpan construction in the middle of the 1990s. Examining the characteristics of their new material the PANArt tuners Sabina Schärer and Felix Rohner created a number of different Pang instruments. In the year 2001 they introduced the Hang. The Gubal was the first Pang instrument that was developed after the Hang. It was introduced in Summer 2013 on occasion of the 20th anniversary of PANArt. The name Gubal is registered as trademark for musical instruments by PANArt Hang Manufacturing Ltd.

The Gubal has some similarities to the Hang but also some important differences that caused its developers to give the instrument a new name.

== Description ==
Like the Hang the Gubal is played with the hands and combines the sounds of a ring of seven tone fields on the upper side of the instrument with the sound of the air in the vessel, the Helmholtz resonance.

Different from the Hang the Gu, a round resonance opening with an inward looking neck, is placed in the center of the upper side of the instrument. It is surrounded by an elastic area, the Ringding. Here the player can stimulate the Helmholtz resonance more strongly than with the Hang generating a strong bass sound. Due to a hemispherical extension on the bottom side of the instrument, called the Gugel, the pitch of the resonance is 78 hertz (E♭_{2}). By inserting a hand into the opening the player can lower this pitch and is able to play different bass tones.

The Ringding is tuned to four partial tones: E♭_{3}, B♭_{3}, E♭_{4} and G_{5}. This way it serves a double function: It is a sound source itself as well as the place to excite the bass sound of the Helmholtz resonance.

The Ringding is surrounded by the ring of seven tone fields created with the hammer and tuned to the notes B♭_{3}, C_{4}, D♭_{4}, E♭_{4}, F_{4}, G_{4} and B♭_{4}.

== The Gubal as part of the Pang ensemble ==
While Felix Rohner and Sabina Schärer understood the Hang as an instrument for the personal use by a single player, they emphasized the potential of the Gubal to be joined by other instruments. However, as most instruments are potentially much louder than the Gubal they faced the problem that instrumental partners drown out the Gubal. Therefore, they began to develop additional Pang instruments optimized as partners for the Gubal. In autumn 2015 the Hang Gudu was introduced and in 2016 three Pang string instruments and the Hang Urgu. This way the Pang ensemble was established. On its website PANArt describes the focus of its current work as follows:

"The call of iron has led PANArt to collective play, out of the relaxing spherical cocoon of the Hang's individual character, and into the excitement of the pulsating music of the ensemble. Together with the string instruments, a new field of musical communication has opened."
