= Handpan =

Pitched percussion instrument

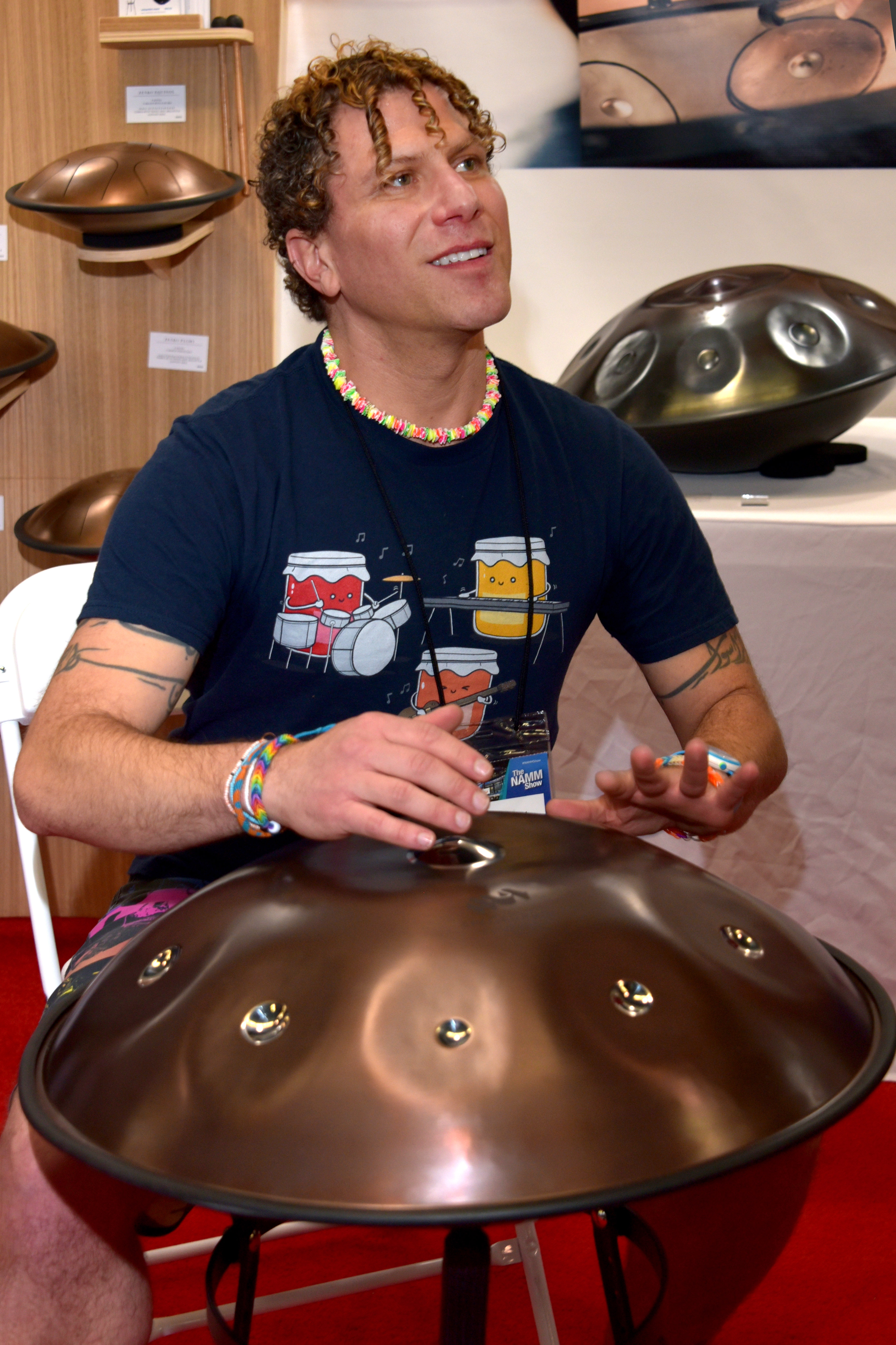
A musician displaying the use of the handpan in 2020

Handpan busker in Tokyo, Japan

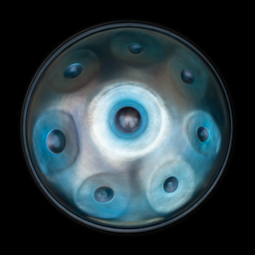
A handpan from the first production run of Pantheon Steel

Handpan is a generic term for a group of musical instruments that are classified as a subset of the steelpan. Several handpan makers and brands emerged following growing worldwide interest in the Hang after it was introduced in 2000.

The basic form of a handpan consists of two metal half-shells glued together, a centre tone field surrounded by a circle of at least seven tone fields on the upper side and an opening in the bottom side. Differences between manufacturers include the materials used, the manufacturing processes of the raw forms, the shaping of the tone fields, and the tuning methods.

== History ==
The term handpan first appeared in 2007 on the website of the American steelpan producer Pantheon Steel and was used to describe their development of a new instrument that was launched as an alternative to the Hang, whose name had been patented by PANArt Hangbau AG. It later found its way into discussions on the now-defunct online Hang-Music Forum. The successor of this forum was founded in 2009 and was called handpan.org, Subsequently, "handpan" became a generic term referring to similar and related instruments.

There are numerous handpan builders around the world, and the specific instruments vary in material, manufacturing techniques, shape, sound, and quality.

PANart, the creators of the Hang, have launched extensive legal proceedings against many handpan builders, deeming their instruments a violation of the company's copyright. In 2025, the Federal Supreme Court of Switzerland confirmed the preliminary judgment of the Commercial Court of the Canton of Bern that the Hang was subject to copyright as a work of applied art, and in 2026, the commercial court found that 210 of the 260 types of handpan submitted to the court violated PANart's copyright. Only models with significant differences, such as instruments whose dome on the top was replaced by a concave tone field, or with triangular rather than circular sound fields, were found not to be in violation.

== See also ==
- Steel tongue drum
