= Nick Mulvey =

English musician (born 1984)

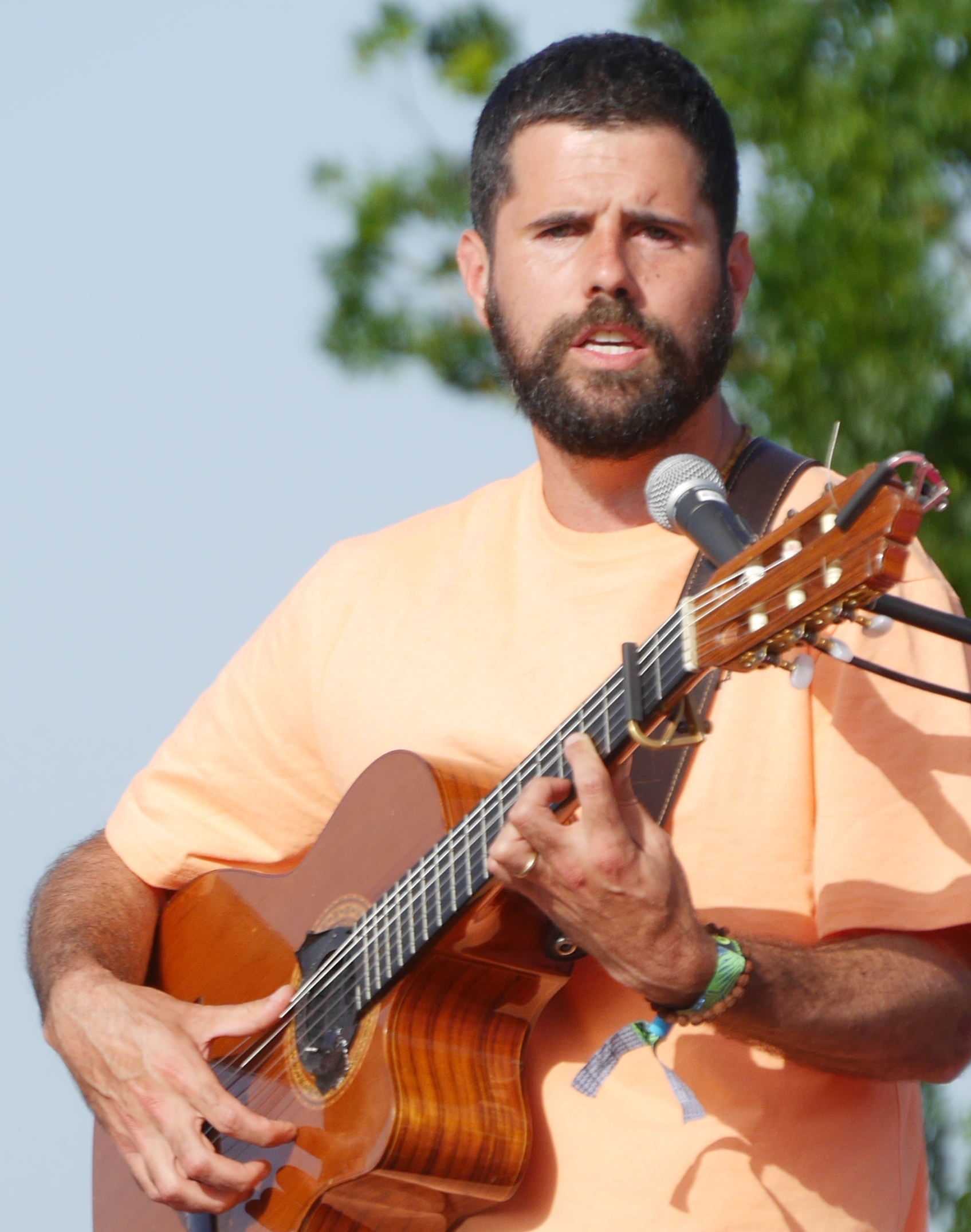
- Nick Mulvey, Glastonbury Festival, 2019

Background information
- Born: Nick Mulvey; 4 November 1984 (age 41); England
- Genres: Alternative, folk, indie
- Occupations: Musician, singer-songwriter
- Instruments: Vocals, guitar, drums, piano, Hang
- Years active: 2007–present
- Website: nickmulvey.com

Nick Mulvey (born 4 November 1984) is an English musician, singer and songwriter. He played the Hang as a founding member of the band Portico Quartet. In 2011, he launched a solo career, releasing the EPs The Trellis (2012) and Fever to the Form (2013) and the full-length album First Mind (2014), which received a Mercury Music Prize nomination. His second album, Wake Up Now, was released on 8 September 2017.

== Beginnings ==
Mulvey grew up in Cambridge and attended Chesterton Community College and Long Road Sixth Form College. At the age of 19 he moved to Havana, Cuba, to study music and art. On returning to the UK, Mulvey enrolled at the University of London's School of Oriental and African Studies to study Ethnomusicology.

== Portico Quartet ==
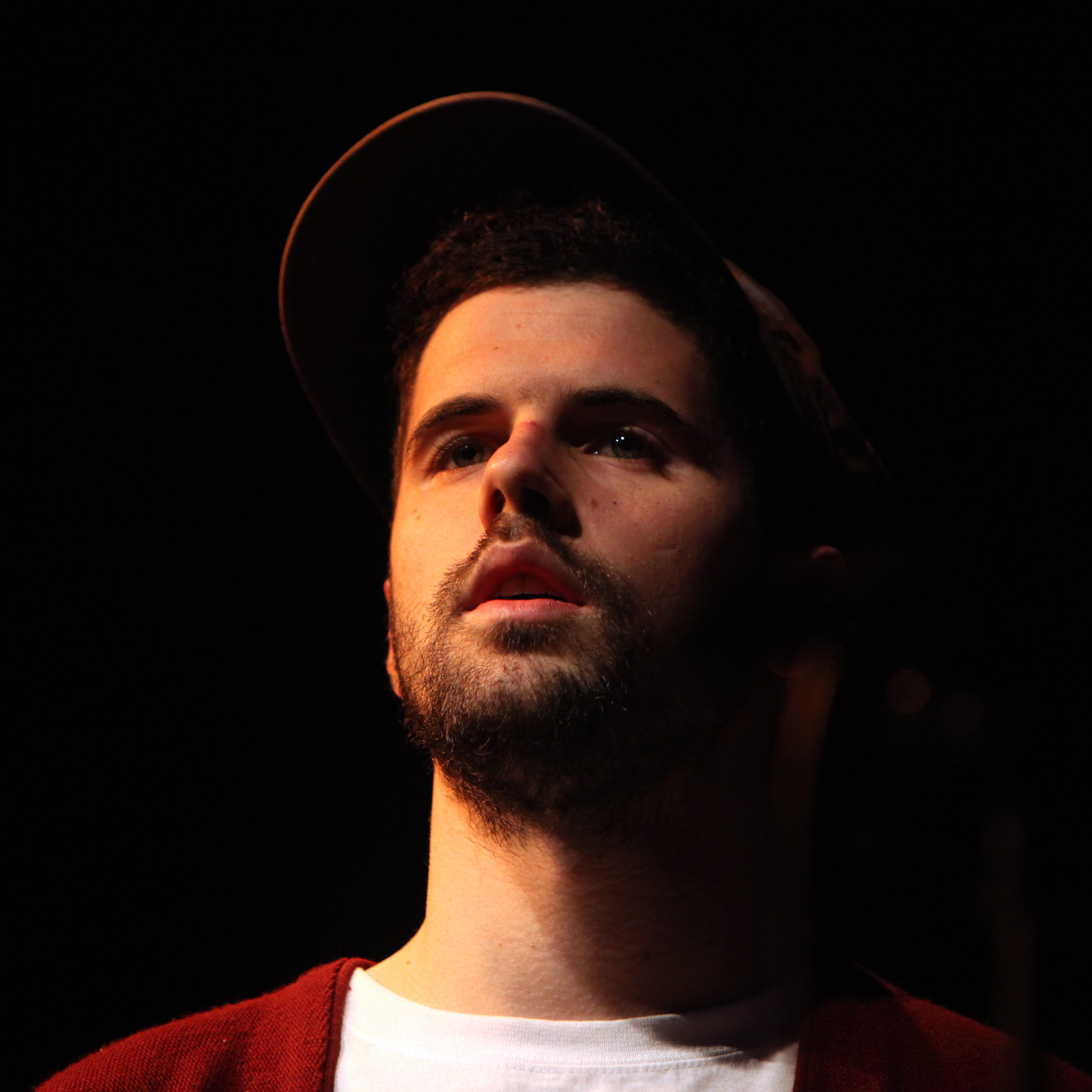
Nick Mulvey, 2011

While studying ethnomusicology at the School of Oriental and African Studies, Mulvey met the other members of Portico Quartet. The band consisted of Cambridge school friend Duncan Bellamy (drums), Jack Wyllie (soprano and tenor saxophone), and Milo Fitzpatrick (double bass). Their debut album Knee-deep in the North Sea, was nominated for the 2008 Mercury Prize alongside Radiohead, Elbow, and Adele. The album's title was mentioned in the closing words to Alt-J's song Dissolve Me. Portico Quartet released their second album Isla on 9 October 2009 through Real World Records.

== Solo career ==
Mulvey left Portico Quartet in 2011 to focus on a solo career as a singer-songwriter. He released his first EP The Trellis in November 2012, and his second, Fever to the Form in July 2013. On his autumn 2013 tour with Laura Marling, he performed in symphony halls across the UK, naming Marling as a great influence to his solo music.

In 2014, Mulvey played Wonderfruit in Thailand.

On 16 May 2017, Mulvey announced the single "Unconditional", and on 20 May 2017 announced the album Wake Up Now, released on 8 September 2017. Two further singles were released: "Myela" (about the European migrant crisis) and "Mountain to Move".

== Discography ==
=== Studio albums ===
Title	Details	Peak chart positions					Certifications
Title	Details	UK	BEL (Fl)	FRA	NED	SCO	Certifications
First Mind	Released: 12 May 2014; Label: Fiction; Format: Digital download, CD, LP	10	127	196	58	10	BPI: Gold
Wake Up Now	Released: 8 September 2017; Label: Fiction, Universal; Format: Digital download, CD, LP	25	149	—	46	56	
New Mythology	Released: 10 June 2022; Label: Fiction, Universal; Format: Digital download, CD, LP	50	—	—	—	18	
Dark Harvest, Pt. 1	Released: 6 June 2025; Label: Supernatural Records; Format: Digital download, CD, LP	—	—	—	—	—	
Dark Harvest, Pt. 2	Released: 24 October 2025; Label: Supernatural Records; Format: Digital download, CD, LP	—	—	—	—	—	
"—" denotes a recording that did not chart or was not released in that territory.

=== Extended plays ===
Title	Details	Certifications
The Trellis	Released: 25 January 2013; Label: Communion Records; Format: Digital download	
Fever to the Form	Released: 17 June 2013; Re-released: 10 January 2014; Label: Communion Records, Universal Music Group; Format: Digital download	BPI: Silver
Wake Up Now (Unplugged) EP	Released: 13 October 2017; Label: Fiction Records; Format: Digital download	
Dancing For The Answers EP	Released: 18 May 2018; Label: Fiction Records; Format: Digital download	
Begin Again	Released: 10 July 2020; Label: Fiction Records; Format: Digital download	

=== Singles ===
Year	Title	Peak chart positions		Certifications	Album
Year	Title	UK	SCO	Certifications	Album
2013	"Nitrous"	—	—		First Mind
2014	"Cucurucu"	26	30	BPI: Silver	First Mind
2014	"Meet Me There"	—	—		First Mind
2014	"I Don't Want to Go Home"	—	—		First Mind
2017	"Unconditional"	—	—		Wake Up Now
2017	"Myela"	—	—		Wake Up Now
2017	"Mountain to Move"	—	—		Wake Up Now
2017	"We Are Never Apart"	—	—		Wake Up Now
2018	"In Your Hands"	—	—		Wake Up Now
2019	"Moment of Surrender"	—	—		Non-album singles
2019	"In the Anthropocene"	—	—		Non-album singles
2022	"Star Nation"	—	—		New Mythology
2022	"A Prayer of My Own"	—	—		New Mythology
2022	"Brother to You"	—	—		New Mythology
2022	"Mecca"	—	—		New Mythology
2024	"Freedom Now" (with Golshifteh Farahani and Arooj Aftab)	—	—		Non-album single
2025	"Radical Tenderness"	—	—		Dark Harvest, Pt. 1
2025	"Holy Days"	—	—		Dark Harvest, Pt. 1
2025	"River To The Real"	—	—		Dark Harvest, Pt. 1
2025	"Every Open Heart"	—	—		Dark Harvest, Pt. 2
2025	"Supernatural Healing"	—	—		Dark Harvest, Pt. 2
2025	"Find Me"	—	—		Dark Harvest, Pt. 2
"—" denotes a recording that did not chart or was not released in that territory.
