= Hang (instrument) =

Percussion instrument

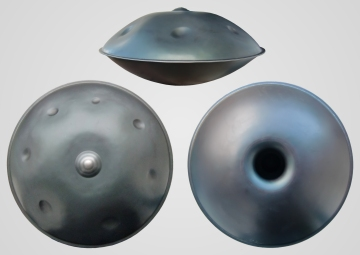
- Free Integral Hang (2010)

Percussion instrument
- Hornbostel–Sachs classification: 111.24 (Percussion vessels)
- Inventors: Felix Rohner; Sabina Schärer
- Developed: 2000

The Hang (German pronunciation: [haŋ]; plural form: Hanghang) is a type of musical instrument fitting into the idiophone class and based on the Trinidad & Tobago steelpan. It was created by Felix Rohner and Sabina Schärer in Bern, Switzerland, and marketed by their company, PANArt Hangbau AGa. They took the name "Hang" from a Bernese German word that means both "hand" and "hillside". Though it has sometimes been referred to as a "Hang drum", the inventors consider this a misnomer.

The Hang is constructed from two half-shells of deep-drawn, nitrided steel sheet glued together at the rim, leaving the inside hollow and creating the shape of a convex lens. The top ("Ding") side has a center 'note' hammered into it and seven or eight 'tone fields' hammered around the center. The bottom ("Gu") is a plain surface that has a rolled hole in the center with a tuned note that can be created when the rim is struck. The instrument uses some of the same basic physical principles as a steelpan, but modified in such a way as to act as a Helmholtz resonator.

The Hang has gone through several iterations, and since its manufacture was discontinued in 2013, PANArt has continued to develop other musical instruments. Global interest in the Hang has led to the creation of similar instruments that are referred to as handpans.

== Sound examples ==
First-generation Hang (2005), here played horizontally on the lap	Second-generation Hang (2007), here played vertically on the lap

== Creation and development ==
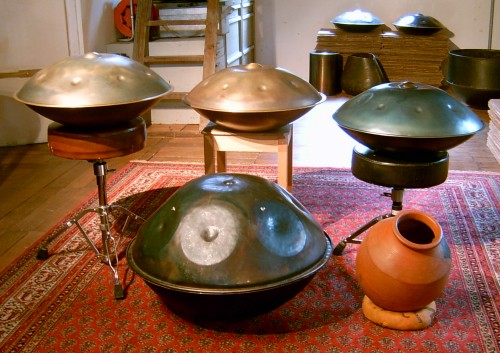
Front line: Prototype Hang from November 1999 (left), Ghatam (right); second line: Three Hanghang, built in 2007, 2006, and 2005, respectively (from left to right)

The Hang was developed in 2000 by Felix Rohner and Sabina Schärer in Bern, Switzerland, and introduced at the Frankfurt Trade Fair in 2001. The pair, who had spent many years developing it, subsequently formed the company PANArt Hangbau AG, under which the instrument would be marketed. They adopted the name from a Bernese German word that has a double meaning, one of which is "hand" and the other "hillside", referring to its convex shape. It is a registered trademark and property of PANArt. Over time, it came to be called a "Hang drum", but Rohner and Schärer have discouraged this, as they consider it a misnomer.

The Hang is a type of handpan, fitting into the idiophone class and based on the Trinidad & Tobago steelpan. It is 52 cm (20 in) in diameter and has a height of 24 cm (9 in). The two deep-drawn steel hemispheres are hardened by a process known as gas nitridization. The side considered the bottom has an opening ("Gu") in the center, which allows the generation of a bass note through Helmholtz resonance. When it is played in a damped way, it can change in pitch similar to a talking drum. On the top are seven or eight notes arranged in a tone circle in zigzag fashion, from low to high. All are tuned harmonically (with fundamental, octave, and the fifth above the octave) around a low note ("Ding") at the center of the tone circle. Each unit is numbered and signed.

=== First generation ===
From 2001 to 2005, the first-generation Hang was offered in multiple scales ranging up to 45 different sound models. Its creators took their initial inspiration from ethnomusicological roots, with notes and scales such as the Aeolian, Akebono, Hijaz, and Pygmy music. From 2001 to 2004, each Hang had eight tone fields in the circle. In 2005, PANArt was able to lower the tones on the Hang significantly in what they referred to as the "Low Hang", with the Ding tuned to F_{3}, E_{3}, or E♭_{3}. It was offered in two versions, with eight or seven tone fields in the circle. Each unit was numbered, the name of the sound model was written, and a signature of either Felix Rohner or Sabina Schärer was pasted on the inside of the Ding surface.

=== Second generation ===
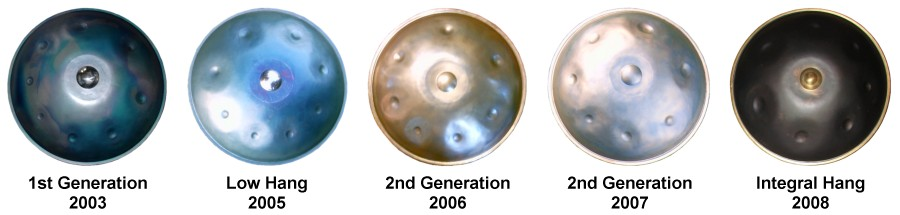
Five development stages of the PANArt Hang

In 2006, a new generation of Hang was introduced. It had a surface coating of annealed brass over the nitrided steel as well as a ring of brass around the circumference. The Ding had a central note at D_{3} and two A notes (A_{3} and A_{4}) as well as another D (D_{4}) in the tone circle. The remaining notes were mixed into several different configurations. The majority of second-generation Hanghang were built with seven tone fields in the circle. Older Hanghang had tone fields with the oval indentation oriented radially towards the Ding, whereas the 2007 models (as well as the Integral Hang) had tone fields angled at about 45° from a line drawn from the Ding to the edge.

=== Integral Hang ===
In 2008, a new version of the instrument was announced, named the Integral Hang, which included several modifications. It had only one scale, with seven tone fields in the cycle (D_{3} Ding, A_{3}, B♭_{3}, C_{4}, D_{4}, E_{4}, F_{4}, A_{4}) and no other sound models offered. The Gu hole was adjusted to a subtly oval shape to improve the tuning of the three partials D_{5}, F_{5}, and an F♯_{5} on the Gu neck. Significant changes were made to the Ding (center note on the top). A circular indentation in the dome was made and had a texture of annealed and lacquered brass. Additional changes were made to the shoulder area, between the flattened Ding and the notes in the tone circle, making for more gradual transitions than in the previous generation. The PANArt logo, serial number, date of finalization, and signatures of the Hang makers were placed on the Gu side, near the equator, where the two shells meet.

By developing the Integral Hang, Rohner and Schärer distanced themselves from the idea of building an instrument for the needs of professional musicians. Their aims and ambitions were published in a "Letter from the Hangbauhaus":

Our concepts, developments and implementations are far from the musical norms of modern times that require study, practice and performance. Playing with this Hang can lead to a form of freedom, an intimate conversation that can only unfold without pressure and coercion. If individuals are aware of this concept, they will be strengthened by this Hang. Thoughtless use can weaken a person.

=== Free Integral Hang ===
2010 saw the introduction of the Free Integral Hang, which features a few construction changes. The brass ring around the seam connecting the Ding and Gu shells was removed. Furthermore, the dome of the Ding was no longer brass-coated and was characterized by a double offset (a triple dome). The Free Integral Hanghang are tuned without the use of tuning devices. The pitch of the Ding differed from one instrument to another, and varied around the tone D_{3}. The tones in the tone circle relative to the Ding corresponded to those of the Integral Hang.

== Termination of Hang manufacturing and development of new Pang instruments ==
As of December 2013, PANArt announced that the Hang would no longer be made, as its makers were shifting to the creation of a new instrument, the Gubal. In the following years, PANArt developed a number of other instruments, such as the Hang Gudu, Hang Urgu, Hang Bal, and Hang Gede. They also created a number of string instruments, together with a collective improvised music form played with these "Pang instruments".

== Playing ==
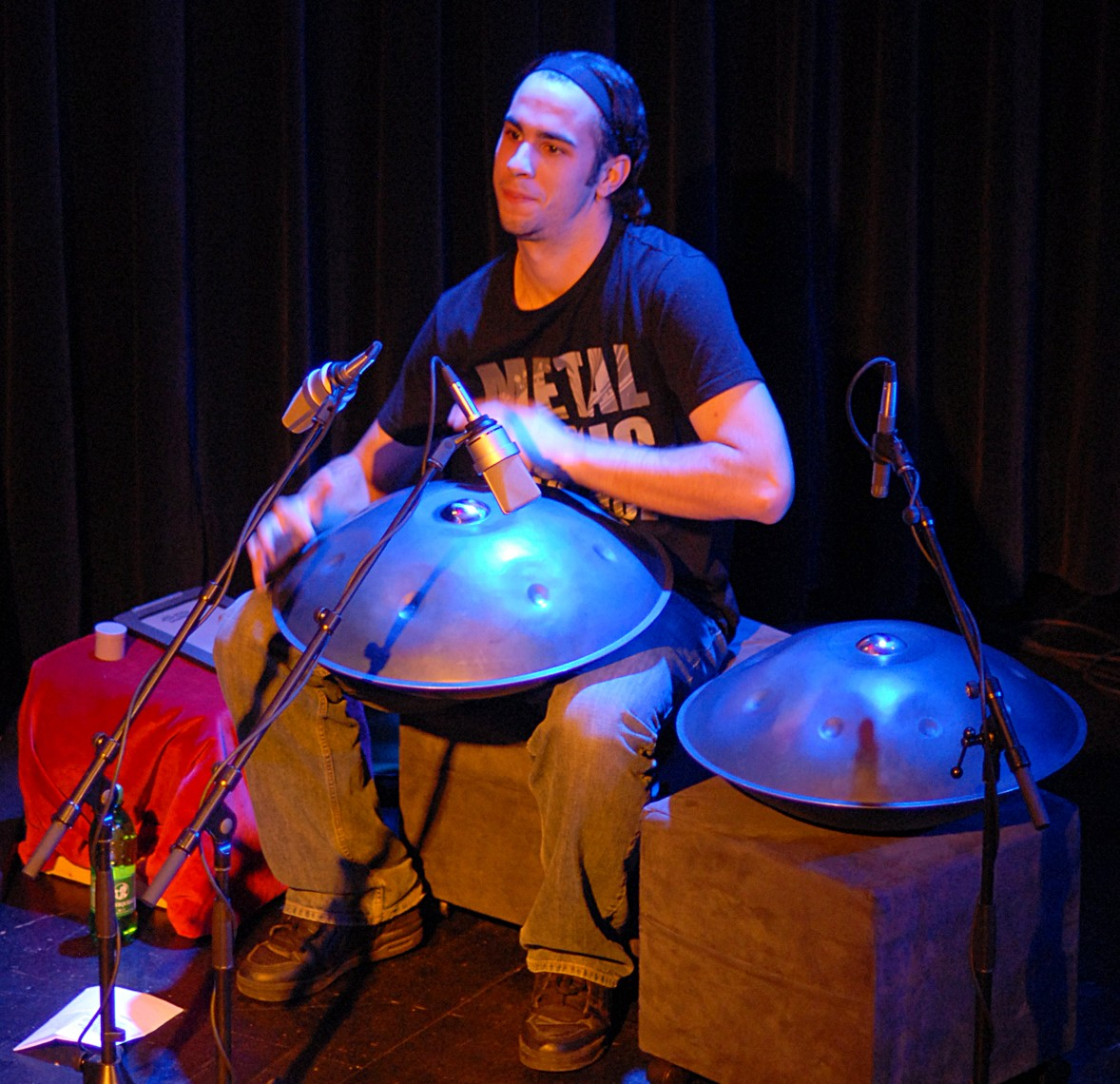
Manu Delago playing a first-generation Hang

The Hang is typically played resting on the player's lap, using hands and fingers instead of mallets. This lighter means of playing produces a softer and warmer sound than the bright sound of a mallet-based traditional steelpan.

The top ("Ding") side of the Hang, depending on how it is played, can sound like a harp, bells, or harmonically tuned steelpans. The notes are laid out in a cross pattern in the tone circle from low to high, so that with a specific orientation of the Hang, the player can ascend or descend the scale by alternating using the left and right hands to strike the tone fields. Each tone field has multiple overtones oriented specifically in the flattened field with a dome at the center. Typically, there is a fundamental tone, an overtone tuned to an octave above that fundamental, and an additional overtone a perfect fifth above that octave (twelfth or tritave). The orientation is fairly consistent across the fields on each Hang, so that the overtones can be highlighted, muted, or extracted based on how and where the player strikes the tone field.

The bottom side of the Hang has a round opening, the "Gu", producing together with the air in the cavity a Helmholtz resonance similar to a ghatam or an udu. In the second generation, known as the Integral Hang and the Free Integral Hang, adjustment of the size of the Gu (by partially blocking it with either a hand or the legs) can generate a sympathetic D_{2} from the Helmholtz resonance, which introduces subtle layers of cross-complexities in the resonance of the instrument as notes are played on the "Ding" side. In the first- and second-generation models, there is a single high note with a long sustain that can be generated by striking the rim of the hole on the "Gu" side. On the Integral Hang, there are two notes that can be generated (F and F♯). The Hang can also be used as a friction idiophone. Shaker-like sounds can be made by sliding a hand across the surface, and it can also ring like a singing bowl by using skin (a hand) or a bow.

In the tuning of a Hang, the focus is not about the precise mathematical frequency ratios of the partials of a tone field but on the impact of the entire sound.

== Copyright issues ==
PANart, the creators of the Hang, have launched extensive legal proceedings against many handpan builders, deeming their instruments a violation of the company's copyright. In 2025, the Federal Supreme Court of Switzerland confirmed the preliminary judgment of the Commercial Court of the Canton of Bern that the Hang was subject to copyright as a work of applied art, and in 2026, the commercial court found that 210 of the 260 types of handpan submitted to the court violated PANart's copyright. Only models with significant differences, such as instruments whose dome on the top was replaced by a concave tone field, or with triangular rather than circular sound fields, were found not to be in violation.
