= List of songs recorded by Lorde =

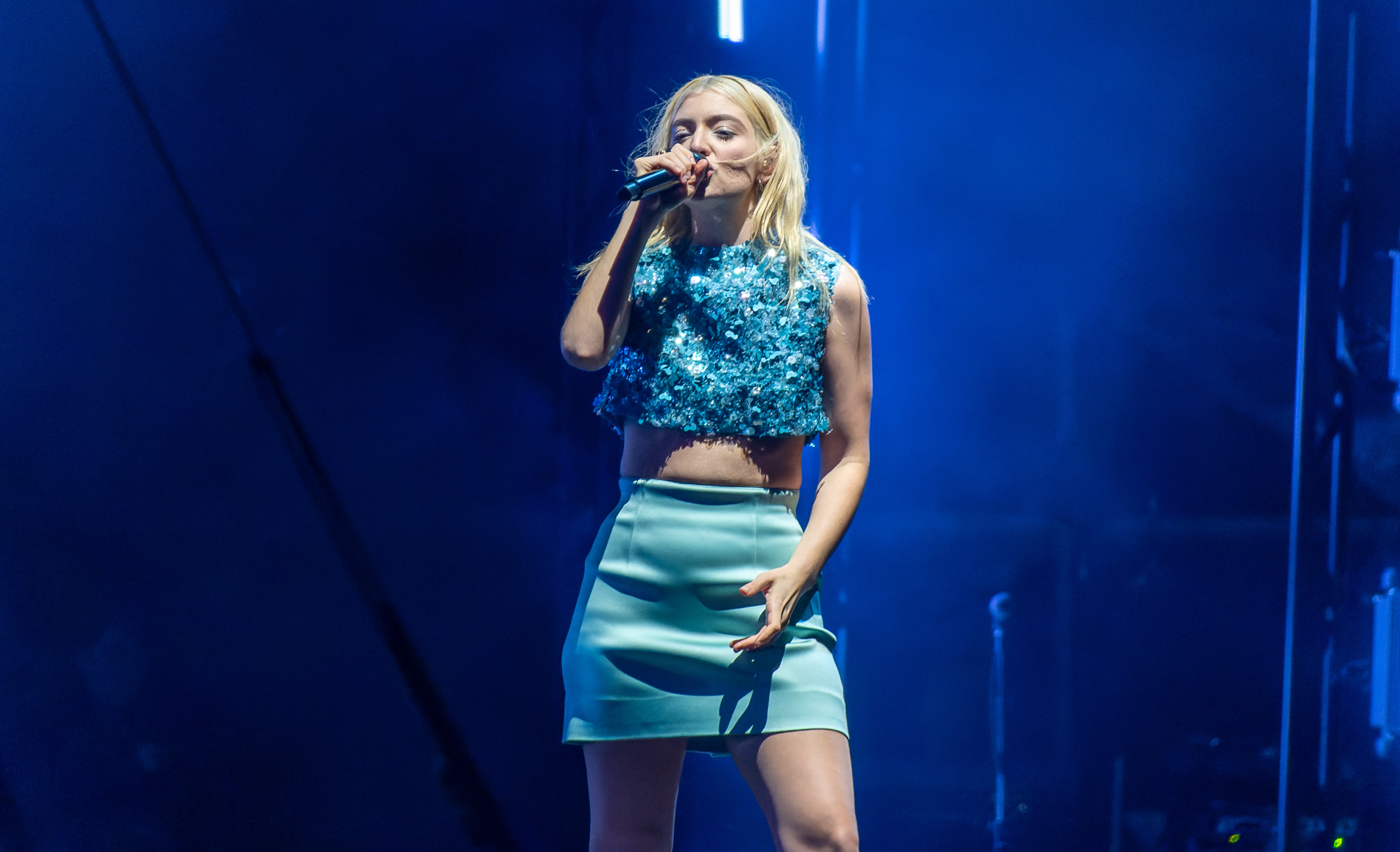
Lorde performing in Newquay in 2023

New Zealand singer-songwriter Lorde (born 1996) has recorded songs for three studio albums, one extended play (EP) and guest features. At the age of 13, she was signed to Universal Music Group (UMG) and started to write music. In November 2012, when she was 16 years old, she self-released an EP entitled The Love Club via SoundCloud. It was made available for purchase in March 2013. In September 2013, Lorde released her debut studio album, Pure Heroine, that included "Royals". The record explored a dream pop and minimalist electronic sound.

Released in 2017, her second studio album, Melodrama, showcased Lorde's interest in piano instrumentation and maximalist pop music. Solar Power, the artist's third studio album, was released on 20 August 2021 and opted for a sonic shift towards acoustic guitars and sparse production alongside a thematic shift towards escapism, introspection, and solipsism.

In addition to her studio work, Lorde has recorded songs for film soundtracks, including "Everybody Wants to Rule the World", originally recorded by band Tears for Fears, from The Hunger Games: Catching Fire (2013), and "Yellow Flicker Beat" from The Hunger Games: Mockingjay, Part 1 (2014), Furthermore, she has recorded vocals for features, including "Easy (Switch Screens)" with Son Lux, "Magnets" with Disclosure, "Don't Take the Money" with Bleachers, and "Girl, So Confusing" with Charli XCX.

== Songs ==
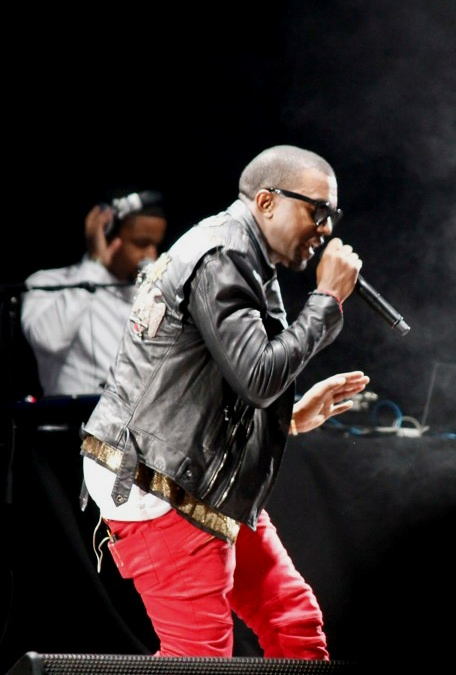
Kanye West produces "Flicker", a rework of "Yellow Flicker Beat", for the Mockingjay soundtrack

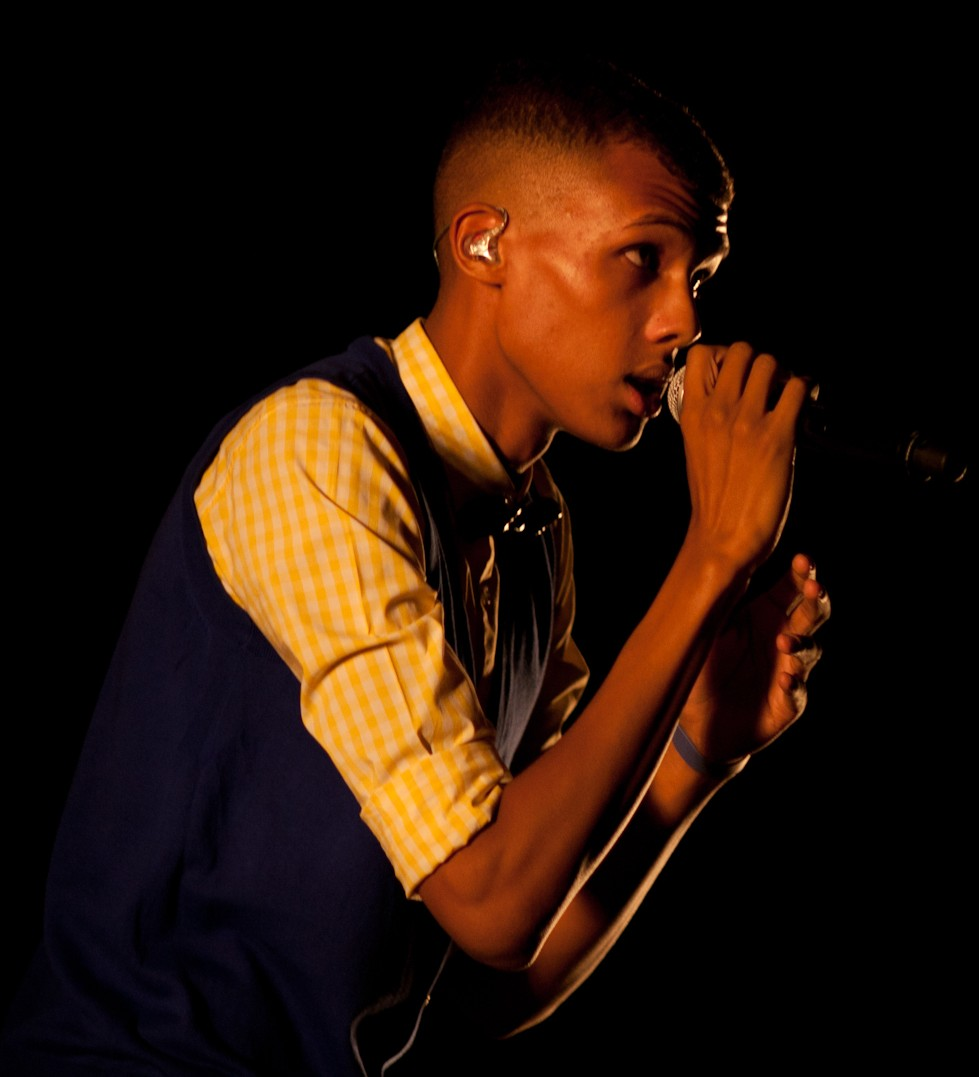
Lorde is featured on "Meltdown" by Stromae on the Mockingjay soundtrack

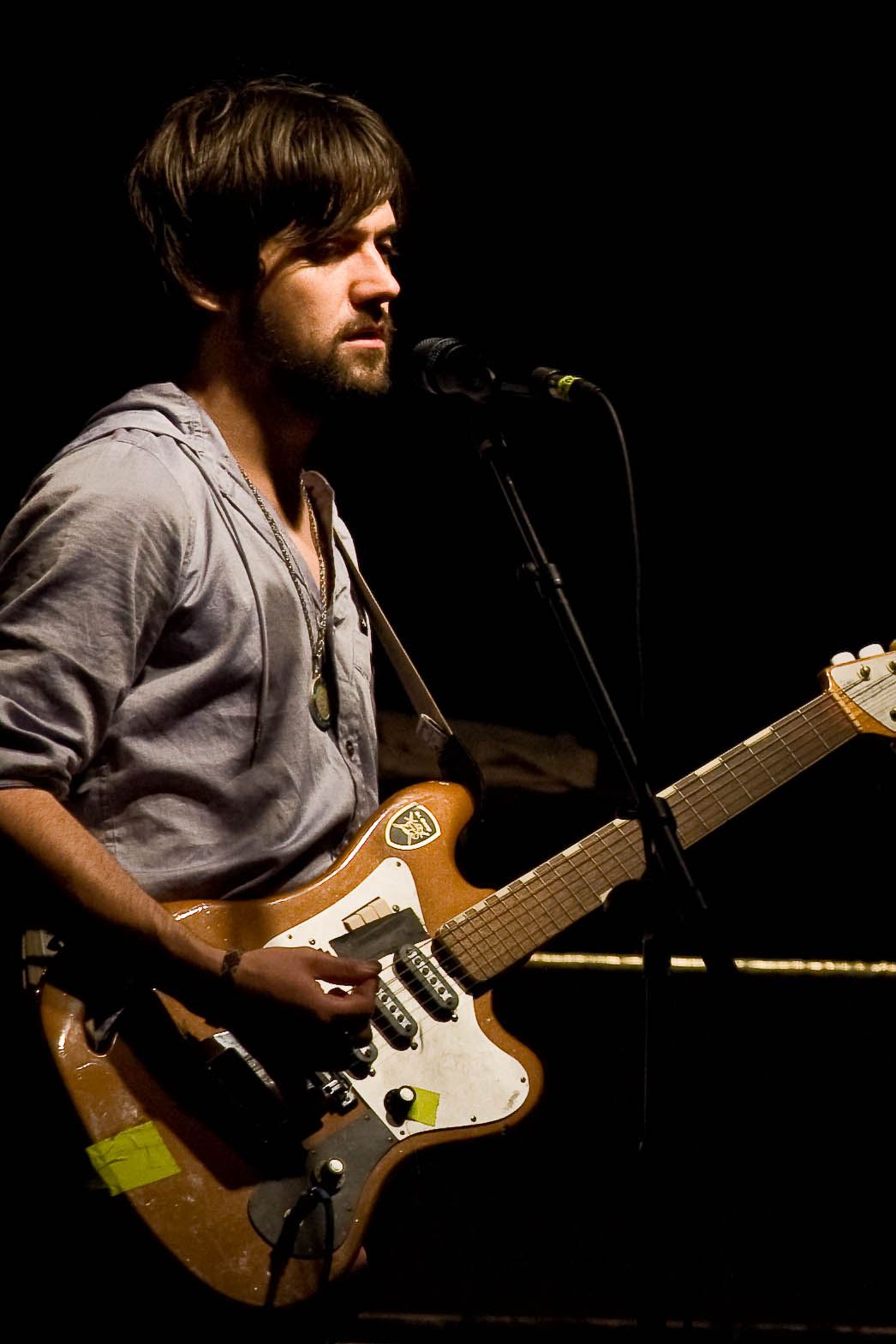
Lorde recorded a cover version of "Ladder Song", which was written by Conor Oberst

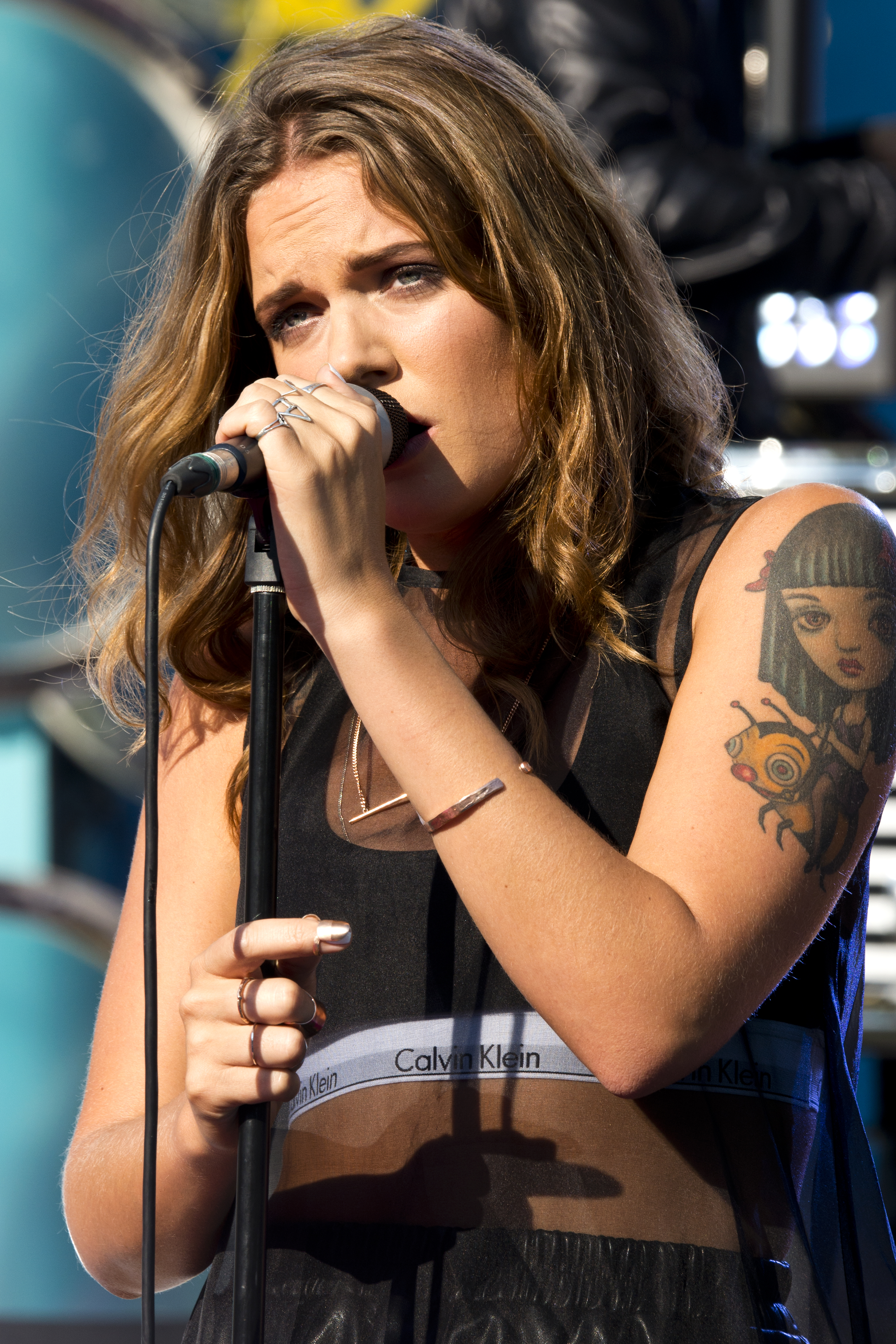
Swedish pop singer Tove Lo co-wrote "Homemade Dynamite" for the album Melodrama

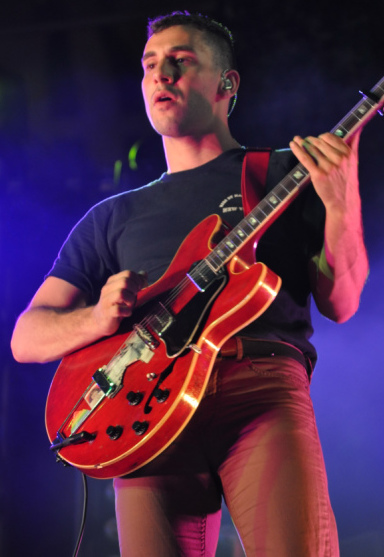
Jack Antonoff served as a co-writer and co-producer for most of the songs on Melodrama with Lorde

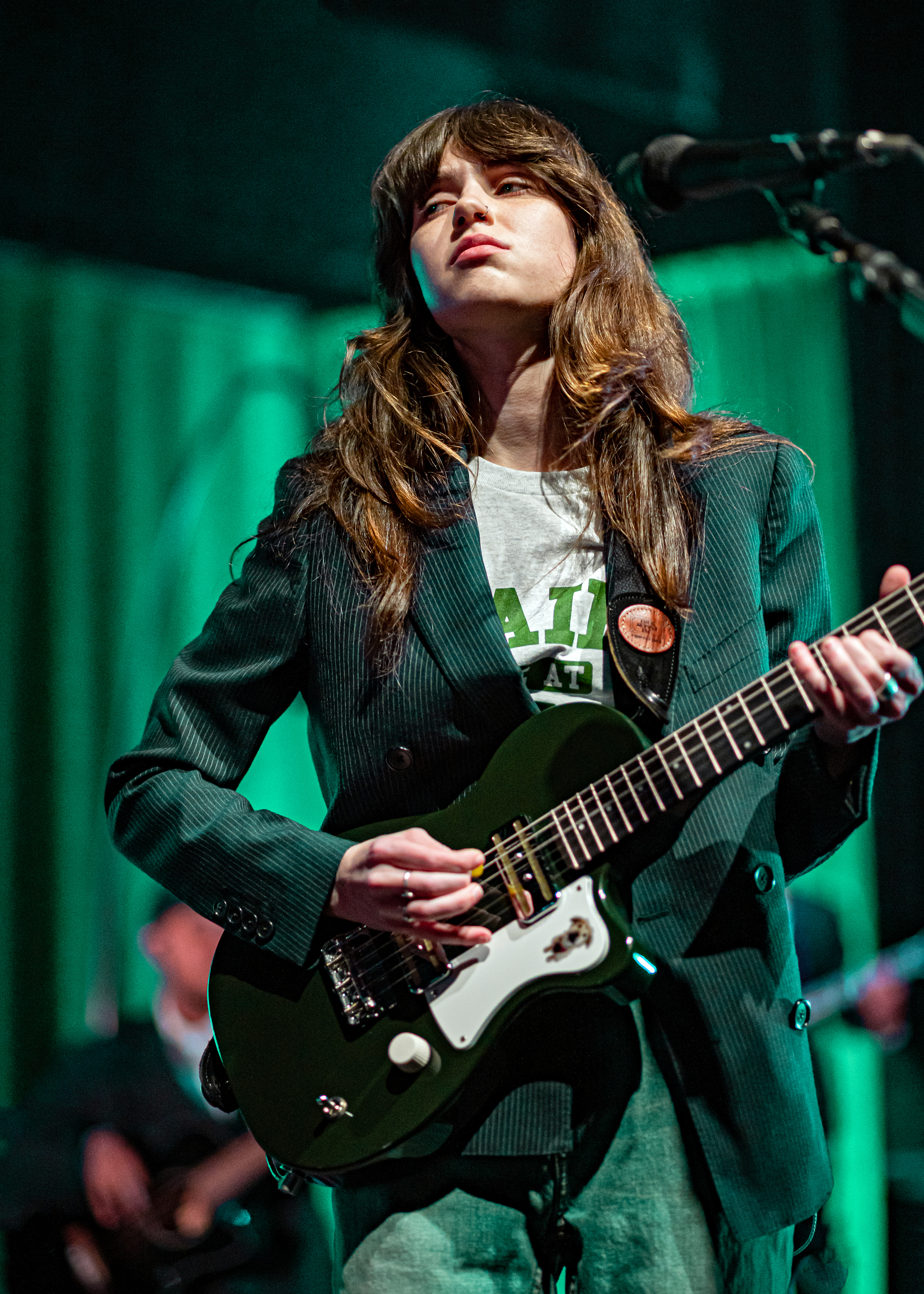
Lorde provided background vocals on "Blouse" and "Reaper" from Clairo's album Sling

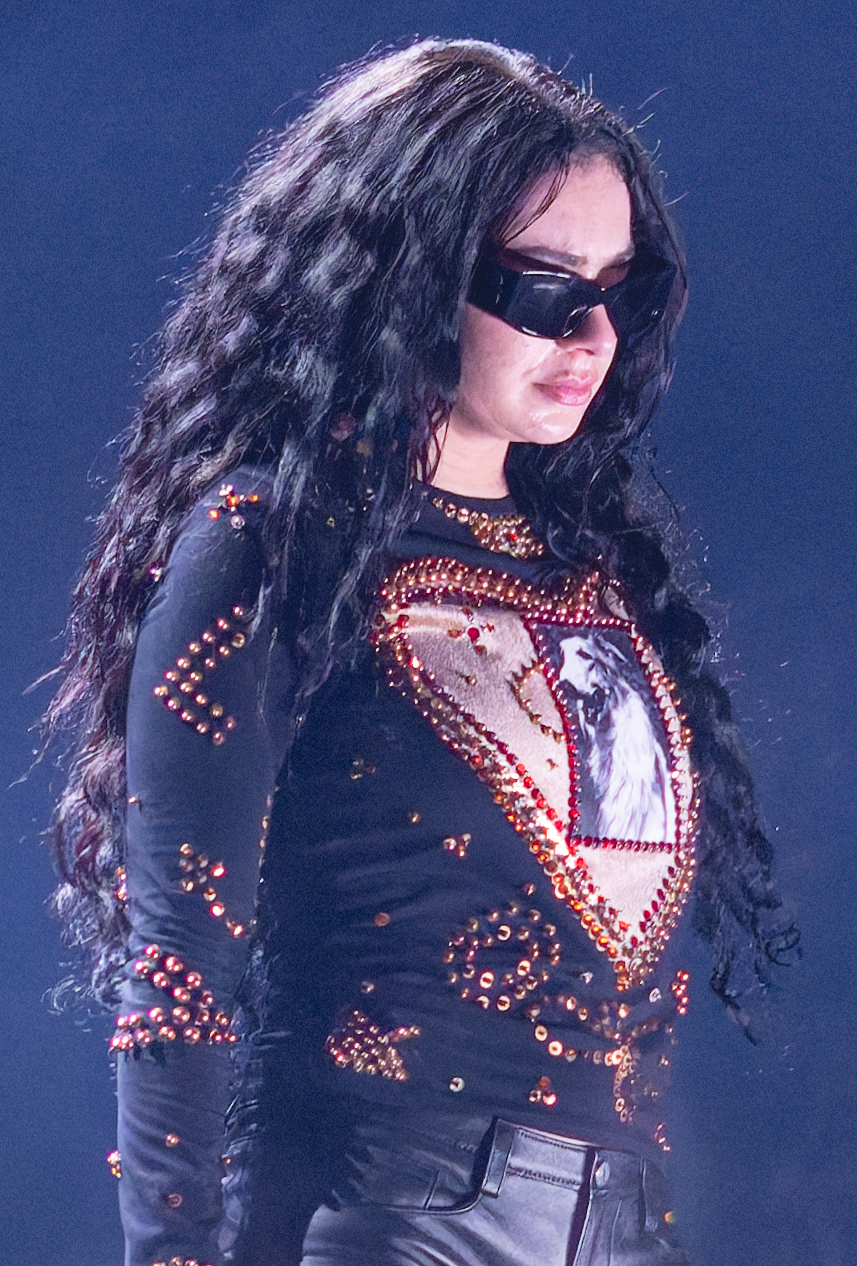
Lorde appeared on a remix of Charli XCX's song "Girl, So Confusing"

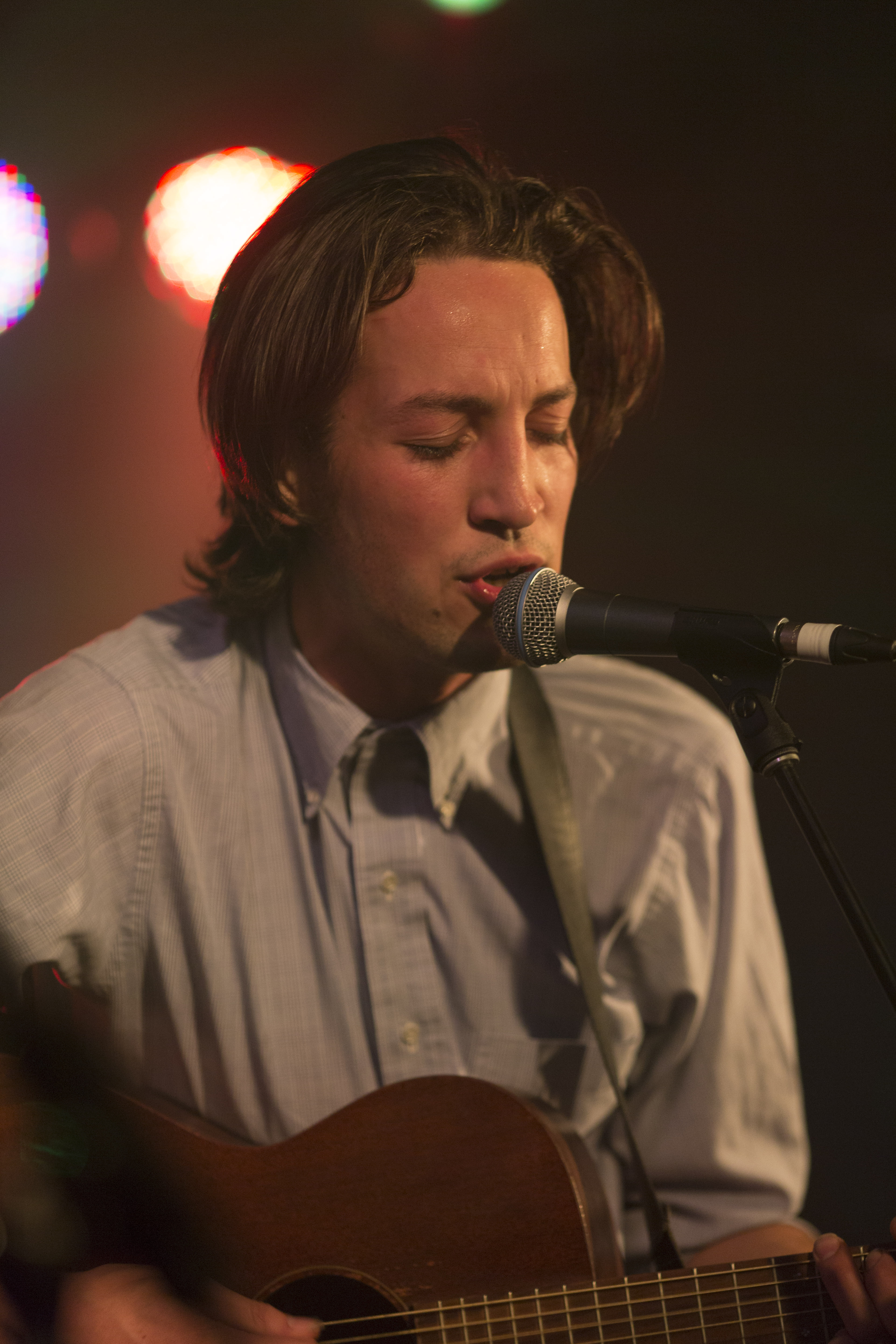
Lorde is featured on Marlon Williams' te reo song "Kāhore He Manu E"

Key
†	Indicates single release
#	Indicates songs with background vocals by Lorde

Song	Artist(s)	Writer(s)	Album	Year	Ref.
"400 Lux"	Lorde	Ella Yelich-O'Connor; Joel Little	Pure Heroine	2013	
"Big Star"	Lorde	Ella Yelich-O'Connor; Jack Antonoff	Solar Power	2021	
"Biting Down"	Lorde	Ella Yelich-O'Connor; Joel Little	The Love Club EP	2012	
"Blouse"	Clairo #	Claire Cottrill	Sling	2021	
"Bravado"	Lorde	Ella Yelich-O'Connor; Joel Little	The Love Club EP	2012	
"Broken Glass"	Lorde	Ella Yelich-O'Connor	Virgin	2025	
"Buzzcut Season"	Lorde	Ella Yelich-O'Connor; Joel Little	Pure Heroine	2013	
"California"	Lorde	Ella Yelich-O'Connor; Jack Antonoff	Solar Power	2021	
"Clearblue"	Lorde	Ella Yelich-O'Connor	Virgin	2025	
"Current Affairs"	Lorde	Ella Yelich-O'Connor	Virgin	2025	
"David"	Lorde	Ella Yelich-O'Connor	Virgin	2025	
"Dominoes"	Lorde	Ella Yelich-O'Connor; Jack Antonoff	Solar Power	2021	
"Don't Take the Money" (Note: Lorde provided un-credited vocals as well as co-writing credits with Antonoff on "Don't Take the Money", taken from Bleachers album Gone Now (2017).) †	Bleachers #	Ella Yelich-O'Connor; Jack Antonoff	Gone Now; MTV Unplugged	2017	
"Easy (Switch Screens)" (Note: "Easy (Switch Screens)" is the remake version of the song "Easy" by Son Lux, taken from his album Lanterns (2013).)	Son Lux featuring Lorde	Ryan Lott	Alternate Worlds	2014	
"Everybody Wants to Rule the World"	Lorde	Lucas Cantor; Chris Hughes; Michael A. Levine; Roland Orzabal; Ian Stanley	The Hunger Games: Catching Fire	2013	
"Fallen Fruit"	Lorde	Ella Yelich-O'Connor; Jack Antonoff	Solar Power	2021	
"Favourite Daughter"	Lorde	Ella Yelich-O'Connor	Virgin	2025	
"Flicker (Kanye West Rework)"	Lorde	Ella Yelich-O'Connor; Joel Little; Kanye West; Mike Dean; Noah Goldstein	The Hunger Games: Mockingjay, Part 1	2014	
"Girl, So Confusing"	Charli XCX and Lorde	Charlotte Aitchison; Ella Yelich-O'Connor; Alexander Guy Cook	Brat and It's Completely Different but Also Still Brat	2024	
"Glory and Gore" †	Lorde	Ella Yelich-O'Connor; Joel Little	Pure Heroine	2013	
"Green Light" †	Lorde	Ella Yelich-O'Connor; Jack Antonoff; Joel Little	Melodrama	2017	
"GRWM"	Lorde	Ella Yelich-O'Connor	Virgin	2025	
"Hammer"†	Lorde	Ella Yelich-O'Connor	Virgin	2025	
"Hard Feelings/Loveless"	Lorde	Ella Yelich-O'Connor; Jack Antonoff	Melodrama	2017	
"Helen of Troy"	Lorde	Ella Yelich-O'Connor; Jack Antonoff	Solar Power	2021	
"Hold No Grudge"	Lorde	Ella Yelich-O'Connor; Malay; Jack Antonoff	Solar Power	2021	
"Homemade Dynamite" (Note: A remix of "Homemade Dynamite" featuring vocals from Khalid, Post Malone and SZA was released as the third single from the singer's album Melodrama (2017).) †	Lorde	Ella Yelich-O'Connor; Tove Lo; Jakob Jerlström; Ludvig Söderberg	Melodrama	2017	
"If She Could See Me Now"	Lorde	Ella Yelich-O'Connor	Virgin	2025	
"Kāhore He Manu E" †	Marlon Williams featuring Lorde	Marlon Williams; Komi Tamati-Elliffe	Te Whare Tīwekaweka	2025	
"Ladder Song"	Lorde	Conor Oberst	The Hunger Games: Mockingjay, Part 1	2014	
"Leader of a New Regime"	Lorde	Ella Yelich-O'Connor	Solar Power	2021	
"Liability"	Lorde	Ella Yelich-O'Connor; Jack Antonoff	Melodrama	2017	
"Liability (Reprise)"	Lorde	Ella Yelich-O'Connor; Jack Antonoff	Melodrama	2017	
"The Louvre"	Lorde	Ella Yelich-O'Connor; Jack Antonoff	Melodrama	2017	
"The Love Club"	Lorde	Ella Yelich-O'Connor; Joel Little	The Love Club EP	2012	
"Magnets" †	Disclosure featuring Lorde	Guy Lawrence; Howard Lawrence; James Napier; Ella Yelich-O'Connor	Caracal	2015	
"Man of the Year"†	Lorde	Ella Yelich-O'Connor; James Harmon Stack	Virgin	2025	
"The Man with the Axe"	Lorde	Ella Yelich-O'Connor	Solar Power	2021	
"Meltdown"	Stromae featuring Pusha T, Q-Tip, Haim and Lorde	Paul van Haver; Ella Yelich-O'Connor; Joel Little; Kamaal Ibn John Fareed; Terrence Thornton; Alana Haim; Este Haim; Danielle Haim	The Hunger Games: Mockingjay, Part 1	2014	
"Million Dollar Bills"	Lorde	Ella Yelich-O'Connor; Joel Little	The Love Club EP	2012	
"Mood Ring"	Lorde	Ella Yelich-O'Connor; Jack Antonoff	Solar Power	2021	
"No Better"	Lorde	Ella Yelich-O'Connor; Joel Little	Pure Heroine (Note: "No Better" is included in the extended version of Pure Heroine. It was released exclusively on iTunes.)	2013	
"Oceanic Feeling"	Lorde	Ella Yelich-O'Connor	Solar Power	2021	
"The Path"	Lorde	Ella Yelich-O'Connor	Solar Power	2021	
"Perfect Places" †	Lorde	Ella Yelich-O'Connor; Jack Antonoff	Melodrama	2017	
"Reaper"	Clairo #	Claire Cottrill	Sling	2021	
"Ribs"	Lorde	Ella Yelich-O'Connor; Joel Little	Pure Heroine	2013	
"Royals" †	Lorde	Ella Yelich-O'Connor; Joel Little	The Love Club EP (Note: "Royals" is replaced by "Swingin Party" on the US iTunes Store version of The Love Club EP.); Pure Heroine	2012	
"Secrets from a Girl (Who's Seen It All)"	Lorde	Ella Yelich-O'Connor; Jack Antonoff; Robin Carlsson	Solar Power	2021	
"Shapeshifter"	Lorde	Ella Yelich-O'Connor	Virgin	2025	
"Sober"	Lorde	Ella Yelich-O'Connor; Jack Antonoff	Melodrama	2017	
"Sober II (Melodrama)"	Lorde	Ella Yelich-O'Connor; Jack Antonoff	Melodrama	2017	
"Solar Power" †	Lorde	Ella Yelich-O'Connor; Jack Antonoff	Solar Power	2021	
"Still Sane"	Lorde	Ella Yelich-O'Connor; Joel Little	Pure Heroine	2013	
"Stoned at the Nail Salon" †	Lorde	Ella Yelich-O'Connor; Jack Antonoff	Solar Power	2021	
"Supercut"	Lorde	Ella Yelich-O'Connor; Jack Antonoff	Melodrama	2017	
"Swingin Party"	Lorde	Paul Westerberg	The Love Club EP	2012	
"Team" †	Lorde	Ella Yelich-O'Connor; Joel Little	Pure Heroine	2013	
"Tennis Court" †	Lorde	Ella Yelich-O'Connor; Joel Little	Pure Heroine	2013	
"What Was That" †	Lorde	Ella Yelich-O'Connor; James Harmon Stack	Virgin	2025	
"White Teeth Teens"	Lorde	Ella Yelich-O'Connor; Joel Little	Pure Heroine	2013	
"A World Alone"	Lorde	Ella Yelich-O'Connor; Joel Little	Pure Heroine	2013	
"Writer in the Dark"	Lorde	Ella Yelich-O'Connor; Jack Antonoff	Melodrama	2017	
"Yellow Flicker Beat" †	Lorde	Ella Yelich-O'Connor; Joel Little	The Hunger Games: Mockingjay, Part 1	2014	

== See also ==
- Lorde discography
