= Glory and Gore =

Single by Lorde

from the album Pure Heroine
- Released: 11 March 2014
- Studio: Golden Age Studios
- Genre: Electropop
- Length: 3:32
- Label: Lava; Republic
- Songwriters: Joel Little; Ella Yelich-O'Connor
- Producer: Joel Little

Lorde singles chronology
"Team" (2013)	"Glory and Gore" (2014)	"Yellow Flicker Beat" (2014)

"Glory and Gore" is a song by New Zealand singer-songwriter Lorde from her debut studio album, Pure Heroine (2013). The song was released on 11 March 2014 as the album's fourth and final single by Lava Records and Republic Records. The track was written by Lorde and its producer, Joel Little. "Glory and Gore" is an electropop song influenced by chillwave and hip hop music. It speaks about modern society's fascination with violence and celebrity culture, comparing these to gladiators.

The song was met with a mixed reception from critics, and reached numbers sixty-eight and nine on the United States Billboard Hot 100 and Hot Rock Songs, respectively. In 2014, "Glory and Gore" was used in an advertisement for the second season of the History television series Vikings.

== Composition and release ==
"Glory and Gore"
The song is a chillwave and hip hop-influenced electropop ballad.

As with the rest of Pure Heroine, "Glory and Gore" was written by Lorde and Joel Little, recorded at Golden Age Studios and produced, mixed and engineered by Little. "Glory and Gore" is a chillwave and hip hop-influenced electropop ballad, instrumented by pulsing synthesisers.

According to the sheet music published at Musicnotes.com by EMI Music Publishing, it is set in a moderate tempo of 72 beats per minute. It is written in the key of F minor, and follows the chord progression A♭–Fm–Cm–B♭m. Lorde's vocals range from E♭_{3} to E♭_{5}. Throughout the song, she uses black satire to express disdain towards modern emphasis on violence, and compares celebrity culture to gladiatorial combat. This is exemplified in the lyric "Glory and gore go hand-in-hand/That's why we're making headlines." It continues the derision of popular culture of "Team", the preceding song on Pure Heroine. "Glory and Gore" also portrays an empowerment theme; PopMatters' Evan Sawdey described it as a "dark" version of Katy Perry's "Roar" (2013).

"Glory and Gore" was sent to United States modern rock radio by Lava Records and Republic Records on 11 March 2014 as the third US single from Pure Heroine, following "Royals" and "Team". A US adult album alternative (AAA) release followed on 7 April 2014. "Glory and Gore" serves as the fourth single overall from Pure Heroine, as "Tennis Court" was released outside the US in 2013. Originally, "Tennis Court" was going to be the third US single, but the record labels changed to "Glory and Gore" instead after it was featured in History's promotional campaign for the second season of its historical television series, Vikings. However, the 8 April 2014 US contemporary hit radio (CHR) scheduled release of "Glory and Gore" was cancelled, and "Tennis Court" eventually impacted US CHR on 22 April 2014.

== Reception ==
In a review of Pure Heroine, Larry Day from The 405 called the track "single-worthy". Billboard's Jason Lipshutz called Lorde's vocals during the song's hook "contagious". Jon Hadusek of Consequence of Sound wrote that "Glory and Gore" did not fit in with the minimal production found in the majority of Pure Heroine. Pitchfork's Lindsay Zoladz criticised the song for having too many lyrics forced into each line. John Murphy from MusicOMH was critical of the latter half of Pure Heroine, writing "by the time 'Glory and Gore' and 'Still Sane' roll around, the template's starting to sound a bit tired."

Following the release of Pure Heroine, "Glory and Gore" appeared at number 17 on the New Zealand Artists Singles Chart dated 7 October 2013. Prior to its single release, the song entered the United States Billboard Hot 100 chart at number 88 on the week of 8 March 2014, with sales of about 32,0000 copies that week—almost double the sales of the previous week. The following week "Glory and Gore" sold 47,000 copies (up 46%) and became the Hot 100's "Digital Gainer" as it moved up to number 68 on the chart. The song peaked at number 30 on the US Digital Songs chart, number seventeen on the US Alternative Songs, and number nine on the main Hot Rock Songs. As of April 2014, "Glory and Gore" has sold 307,000 digital downloads in the US.

== Live performances ==
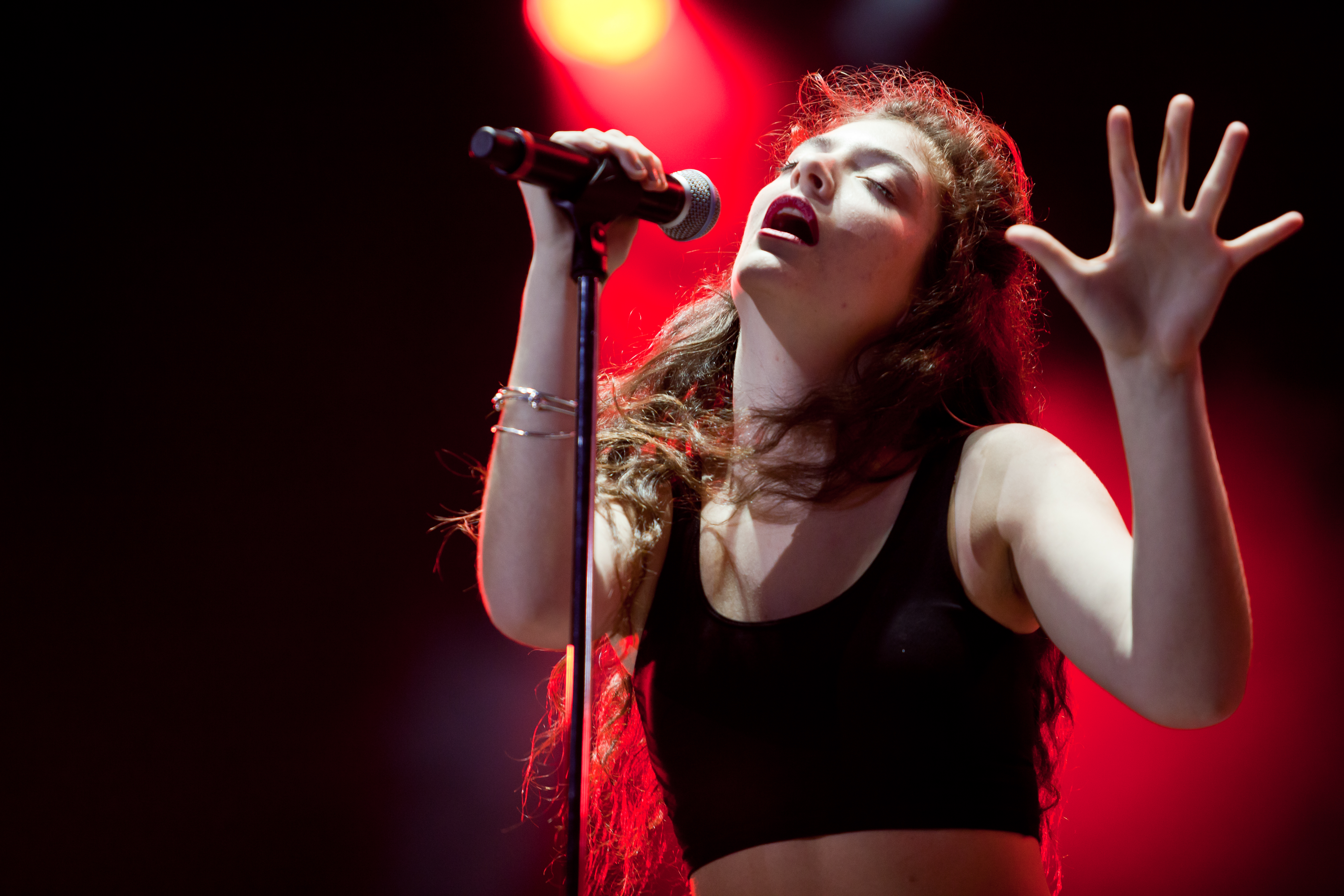
Lorde performing at Lollapalooza in 2014

On 24 September 2013, Lorde performed the track, among others, at The Fonda Theatre in Los Angeles, California. On 3 October 2013, Lorde held a concert at the Warsaw Venue in Brooklyn and performed the song among other tracks from the album. Lorde performed "Glory and Gore" at Silo Park, Auckland on 29 January 2014 as part of her make-up show for the 2014 Laneway Festival, with The New Zealand Herald's Chris Schulz calling the performance a "highlight". In 2014, Lorde opened her show at Roseland Ballroom and her Coachella Festival set with the song, and performed it at Lollapalooza in São Paulo, Brazil and in Buenos Aires, Argentina.

== Charts ==
=== Weekly charts ===
Chart (2013–14)	Peak; position
Australia (ARIA)	100
Canada Hot Digital Songs (Billboard)	75
Canada Rock (Billboard)	36
New Zealand Artists Singles (Recorded Music NZ)	17
US Billboard Hot 100	68
US Hot Rock Songs (Billboard)	9

=== Year-end charts ===
Chart (2014)	Position
US Hot Rock Songs (Billboard)	30

== Certifications ==
Region	Certification	Certified units/sales
Australia (ARIA)	Gold	35,000^{‡}
Brazil (Pro-Música Brasil)	Gold	30,000^{‡}
Canada (Music Canada)	Gold	40,000^{‡}
New Zealand (RMNZ)	Gold	15,000^{‡}
United States (RIAA)	Platinum	1,000,000^{‡}
^{‡} Sales+streaming figures based on certification alone.

== Release history ==
Region	Date	Format	Label(s)	Ref.
United States	11 March 2014	Modern rock	Lava; Republic	
United States	7 April 2014	Adult album alternative	Lava; Republic	
