= No Better =

Promotional single by Lorde

from the album Pure Heroine (Note: "No Better" appeared on the extended version of Pure Heroine exclusively on the iTunes Store from 2013-2021.)
- Released: 13 December 2013
- Studio: Golden Age Studios, Morningside, Auckland, New Zealand
- Genre: Electropop; trip hop
- Length: 2:50
- Label: Universal
- Songwriters: Ella Yelich-O'Connor; Joel Little
- Producer: Joel Little

"No Better" is a song by New Zealand singer-songwriter Lorde, taken from the extended version of her debut studio album Pure Heroine (2013). The track was released on 13 December 2013 by Universal Music Group as a promotional tool for the album. "No Better" is an electropop and trip hop ballad with elements of hip hop, in which Lorde discusses an infatuation. Music critics opined that the single has similar musical style to songs from Pure Heroine.

== Background and composition ==
"No Better"
A 17 second sample of "No Better", combining electropop and trip hop genres with hip hop elements.

"No Better" was written by Lorde (credited under her birth-name Ella Yelich-O'Connor) and Joel Little. On 13 December 2013, the track was released as a digital download single on the iTunes Store. The single was made available for free until 19 December as a part of the iTunes Store's "12 Days of Gifts" Christmas promotion.

"No Better" is an electropop and trip hop ballad with hip hop elements. The song has a similar sonority to that of other songs from Pure Heroine, featuring Lorde's "feathery" vocals and minimal production. It incorporates "woozy" basslines, and "pulsing" synthesisers in its instrumentation, making the song's melody "dreamy", according to Whitney Phaneuf of HitFix. Lyrically, the song features Lorde "[celebrating] an infatuation that deepens as the seasons change". At the first verse, she sings "We roll in every summer when there's strength in our numbers / And your breath's hot and gross but I kiss you like a lover". During the chorus, the bass beat becomes more intense as Lorde sings "Go all the way / Have your fun, have it all".

== Reception ==
Marc Hogan from Spin wrote that the song "flits between fairly vivid first-person details", while Whitney Phaneuf from HitFix labelled "No Better" a "sexy" track. Eric Danton of Rolling Stone opined that the lyrics of the song are "girlish and knowing". Writing for Slate, L. V. Anderson shared that "No Better" is reminiscent of some of the best tracks on Pure Heroine, but also "lighter, simpler [...] and more confectionary than most of her debut album", in spite of its dark theme. "No Better" entered the New Zealand Artists Singles Chart at number seven on 23 December 2013. It dropped to number nineteen the following week, before falling out of the chart. The song was released on streaming services in 2021.

In 2025, during the Ultrasound World Tour, Lorde performed the song for the first time since 2014.

== Track listing ==
- Digital download
1. "No Better" – 2:50
2. "Royals" (music video) – 4:03

== Release history ==
Region	Format	Date	Label	Ref.
Australia	Digital download	13 December 2013	Universal	
Belgium	Digital download	13 December 2013	Universal	
Finland	Digital download	13 December 2013	Universal	
Germany	Digital download	13 December 2013	Universal	
India	Digital download	13 December 2013	Universal	
Ireland	Digital download	13 December 2013	Universal	
New Zealand	Digital download	13 December 2013	Universal	
Portugal	Digital download	13 December 2013	Universal	
Spain	Digital download	13 December 2013	Universal	
Switzerland	Digital download	13 December 2013	Universal	
United Kingdom	Digital download	13 December 2013	Universal	
United States	Digital download	13 December 2013	Universal	
