= Tennis Court (song) =

2013 single by Lorde

Single by Lorde

from the album Pure Heroine
- B-side: "Swingin Party"
- Released: 7 June 2013
- Studio: Golden Age (Auckland, New Zealand)
- Genre: Alternative pop; electronica; art pop; downtempo
- Length: 3:18
- Label: Universal
- Songwriters: Ella Yelich-O'Connor; Joel Little
- Producer: Joel Little

Lorde singles chronology
"Royals" (2013)	"Tennis Court" (2013)	"Team" (2013)

Music video
- "Tennis Court" on YouTube

"Tennis Court" is a song recorded by New Zealand singer-songwriter Lorde. She co-wrote the song with Joel Little, with production handled by the latter. Universal Music Group (UMG) released the song as the second single from her debut studio album Pure Heroine (2013) in Australia and New Zealand on 7 June 2013. On the same day, the label released an extended play (EP) of the same name containing three additional tracks throughout Europe. It combines alternative pop, art pop, and downtempo music over hip hop beats, minimalist synthesisers, and an electronic pulse. Inspired by Lorde's fresh insights into the music industry, the lyrics address her newfound fame and nostalgia for Auckland.

"Tennis Court" received positive reviews from music critics, with some highlighting the song's production and lyrical content. It was a commercial success in Oceania, reaching number one in New Zealand and number 20 in Australia. Elsewhere, the single achieved modest chart success throughout Europe and North America. "Tennis Court" earned platinum certification in Canada and triple platinum certifications in New Zealand and Australia. Joel Kefali directed the song's accompanying music video, a one shot in which Lorde stares at the camera throughout. "Tennis Court" was included on the set list of Lorde's Pure Heroine Tour (2013–14) and Melodrama World Tour (2017–18).

== Background and production ==
New Zealand singer-songwriter Lorde (born 1996 as Ella Yelich-O'Connor) was interested in performing live at local venues around her home city of Auckland during intermediate school years. Scott Maclachlan, an A&R executive of Universal Music Group (UMG), discovered Lorde upon witnessing her performance at her school talent show when she was 12. Maclachlan subsequently signed Lorde to UMG for development and paired her up with Joel Little, a songwriter and record producer. In December 2011, the pair finished their first collaborative effort, a five-track extended play (EP) titled The Love Club. Lorde then self-released the EP for free download via her SoundCloud account in November 2012.

Upon completion of The Love Club, Lorde and Little quickly collaborated again, initially planning to release another EP. The pair recorded materials at Little's Golden Age Studios in Morningside and started writing "Tennis Court" in January 2013. They also recorded several additional tracks and ultimately decided to work on a full-length studio album instead. Little acted as the song's sole producer, using audio software Pro Tools. Songwriting for "Tennis Court" was different from how Lorde usually writes songs; by and large, she would have a lyric forming before going into the studio to record. For this song, Little and Lorde first wrote the music and the beat, and the lyrics were built on the instant instrumental. Speaking to Billboard in November 2013, Little appreciated Lorde's developed songwriting skills on "Tennis Court", for which Lorde wrote the melody and the whole chorus, praising her as "an amazing songwriter".

== Release ==
On 7 June 2013, Universal Music Group released "Tennis Court" for digital download as Lorde's second single following "Royals" in Australia and New Zealand, where Lorde's cover of The Replacements' 1985 song "Swingin Party" serves as the B-side. On the same day, an EP of the same name was released digitally throughout Europe. The EP contains three additional tracks—"Swingin Party", "Biting Down" and "Bravado"—all of which were previously included on The Love Club EP. On 22 July, the EP was released as a 10-inch vinyl in the UK by Virgin EMI Records. "Tennis Court" was later included as the opening track on Lorde's debut studio album Pure Heroine, released on 27 September 2013.

In the US, "Tennis Court" was released as a 7-inch vinyl single on 27 August 2013. Lava and Republic Records initially planned to service "Tennis Court" to US modern rock radio on 11 March 2014 and contemporary hit radio (CHR) on 8 April 2014 as the album's third US airplay single, following "Royals" and "Team". Republic cancelled the scheduled release in favour of "Glory and Gore", which impacted modern rock radio on 11 March 2014. The label also planned to service "Glory and Gore" to CHR, but instead serviced "Tennis Court" to CHR as originally planned. "Tennis Court" ultimately impacted hot adult contemporary radio and CHR on 21 and 22 April 2014, respectively. It was released to UK radio on 12 May 2014.

== Composition ==
"Tennis Court"
"Tennis Court" combines alternative pop, art pop and downtempo genres over hip hop-influenced beats. The song incorporates a minimalist production, utilising synthesiser and an electronic pulse.

"Tennis Court" is written in the key of C major and has a moderate tempo of 90 beats per minute. Lorde's vocal range on the song spans one octave, from G_{3} to G_{4}. It combines alternative pop, art pop, and downtempo genres over hip hop-influenced beats, minimalist synthesisers, and an electronic pulse. Billboard editor Jason Lipshutz commented that "Tennis Court" conveys a darker aspect of pop music. Nick Messtite from Forbes wrote that the track was reminiscent of The Postal Service's 2003 song "The District Sleeps Alone Tonight", Clash's Joe Zadeh likened the song's production to The xx's 2013 song "Together". Siân Rowe from NME compared "Tennis Court" to works by Lana Del Rey.

== Lyrical interpretation ==
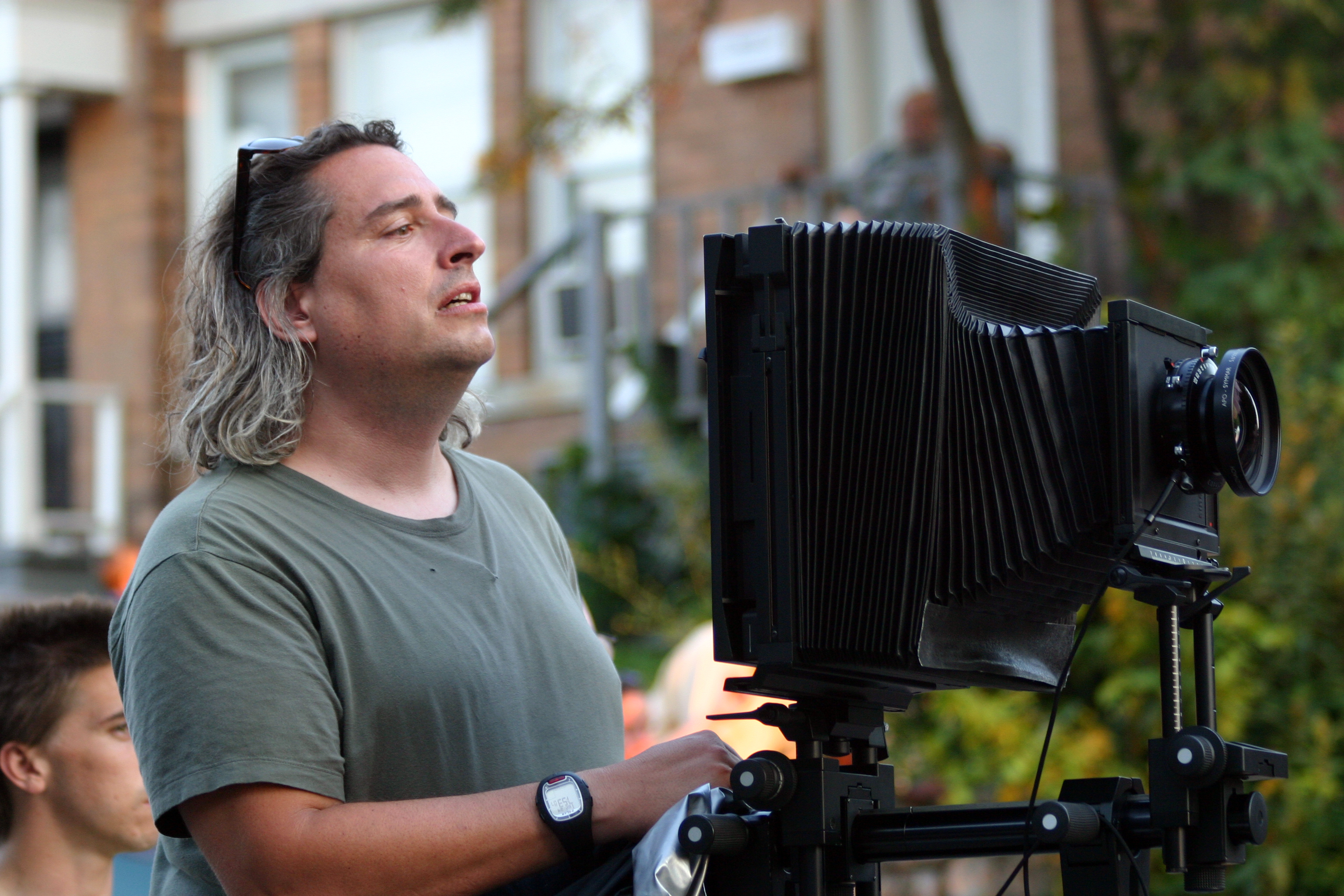
The works by American photographer Gregory Crewdson (pictured) were a source of inspiration for the lyrics.

The song's lyrics address Lorde's newfound fame. In an interview with Spotify in May 2013, Lorde explained that "Tennis Court" was inspired by her friends and daily life in her hometown Auckland, saying that the song was a summary of the events she witnessed during the previous months of her life. On her Tumblr account, the singer elaborated on the tennis court imagery as "a symbol of nostalgia" that embodied memories of her hometown. Lorde also elucidated that the track reflected the changes in her life at the moment, when she had ventured into a career in music.

Lorde also took inspiration from "how superficial people can be" after having perceived the mechanism of the music industry. Paul Lester from The Guardian opined that the song criticises the extravagant lifestyle of the rich, while Billboard writer Drew Fortune compared its songwriting to the works of American rock musician Paul Westerberg. During the songwriting process, Lorde explained that she took an interest to the works of American photographer Gregory Crewdson due to his depictions of human life, suburbia and sense of loneliness.

The track opens with Lorde questioning "Don't you think that it's boring how people talk?", which suggests "a frictional relationship with the high life", and summarises Pure Heroine's central theme of Lorde's observations and critiques of mainstream culture. The refrain contains the lyrics "Baby be the class clown / I'll be the beauty queen in tears", which express underlying sorrow behind superficial beauty. The follow-up lines "It's a new art form showing people how little we care / We're so happy even when we're smilin' out of fear" illustrate Lorde feigning disinterest when facing fame and adolescence. In the second verse, Lorde wonders about her future music career, therefrom expecting inevitable nostalgia of her non-celebrity lifestyle, "But my head's filling up with the wicked games, up in flames / How can I fuck with the fun again, when I'm known?" At the bridge, Lorde sings "I fall apart, with all my heart / And you can watch from your window", which HuffPost interpreted as a commentary on the breakdowns of teenage celebrities.

== Critical reception ==
"Tennis Court" received generally positive reviews from contemporary critics. Siân Rowe from NME complimented Lorde's "strong pop vocals". Emily Yoshida from Grantland labelled it a "murkily winsome, ever-so-slightly chopped ballad", while Kyle Jaeger writing for The Hollywood Reporter commended the track's lyrical content and its "catchy" melody. Billboard's Jason Lipshutz was favourable towards the song's "detached attitude" and minimalist production that evoked "something intoxicating" in the music scene. Sharing the same sentiment, Adam Offitzer from independent music blog Pretty Much Amazing regarded "Tennis Court" as a "[burst] of originality" in the mainstream music scene of "mindless hooks and dubstep anthems" for its minimalism and "clever" lyrics.

Pitchfork writer Lindsay Zoladz applauded the song's narrative for "exposing irony and even hypocrisy without coming off as preachy or moralistic". In his review of Pure Heroine, Jon Hadusek from Consequence of Sound selected "Tennis Court" as an "essential" track and highlighted its narrative lyrics. Time Out editor Nick Levine similarly lauded Lorde's "compelling" songwriting ability despite her young age at the time and praised the song's composition as "glorious". AllMusic's Stephen Thomas Erlewine and The Independent's Andy Gill also picked "Tennis Court" as a standout track of Pure Heroine, while John Murphy from musicOMH complimented the track as "impossible not to sing along to". In a less enthusiastic review, Evan Sawdey of PopMatters considered the song a "drawback" that does not "[suit] her well". Paste ranked it number 34 on their list of the 40 Best Debut Album Openers of All-Time.

== Commercial performance ==
"Tennis Court" debuted atop the New Zealand Singles Chart dated 17 June 2013, becoming Lorde's second number-one single on the chart following "Royals", which reached the top position in March 2013. It spent 21 weeks on the chart, six of which in the top ten. The single received triple platinum certification from Recorded Music NZ for exceeding sales of 45,000 copies in the country. "Tennis Court" was the 19th best-selling single of 2013 in New Zealand. In neighbouring Australia, the single peaked at number 20 on the ARIA Singles Chart and remained on the chart for 22 weeks. It was certified five times platinum by the Australian Recording Industry Association (ARIA).

Outside Australasia, the single achieved modest commercial success. It peaked at number 78 on the Canadian Hot 100 and remained for five weeks on the chart. The track earned platinum certification from Music Canada, which denotes shipments of 80,000 copies in the country. The single had the similar position on the UK Singles Chart and was certified gold by the British Phonographic Industry (BPI) for track-equivalent sales of 400,000 units, based on sales and streams. It also entered the top 100 of the German Singles Chart, where it reached number 83. Despite not entering the record chart of Norway, the song was certified platinum by IFPI Norway for exceeding sales of 10,000 units in the country. In the US, "Tennis Court" debuted at number 71, which was also its highest placement, on the Billboard Hot 100 chart dated 19 October 2013. The single spent 18 weeks on the chart and had sold 355,000 copies in the US by April 2014. It also reached number nine on the Hot Rock Songs, a Billboard auxiliary chart.

== Music video ==
The music video is a one-shot in which Lorde looks into the camera, lip-synching to a repeated "Yeah!", but no other lyrics.

The official music video for "Tennis Court" was directed by Joel Kefali, who previously worked with Lorde on the accompanying video for her debut single "Royals". The video was filmed as a one-shot. Lorde appears in "black clothing, braided hair, and dark lipstick." It features Lorde staring into the camera as the song plays; she does not lip sync the lyrics except for the word "Yeah!" after each verse and during the chorus. The set lighting fades in and out throughout the video.

Writing for The Washington Post, Bethonie Butler observed a discrepancy between Lorde's statement that "In a perfect world, [she] would never do any interviews, and probably there would be one photo out there of [her]", and the fact that, in the music video, Lorde is "front and center." Butler viewed the video as "a metaphor for celebrity." Writing for Ryan Seacrest's website, Kathleen Perricone complimented the "super simple" clip, which allowed Lorde's "voice and lyrics [to] really shine." Lindsay Zoladz, of Pitchfork Media, compared the video to that for The Replacements' "Bastards of Young" (1985). MTV News editor Luke O'Neil wrote that the "Tennis Court" video is "a bit unsettling at first, but eventually it starts to make sense. [Lorde is] trying to do things a bit differently, and so far it seems like it's working."

== Live performances ==
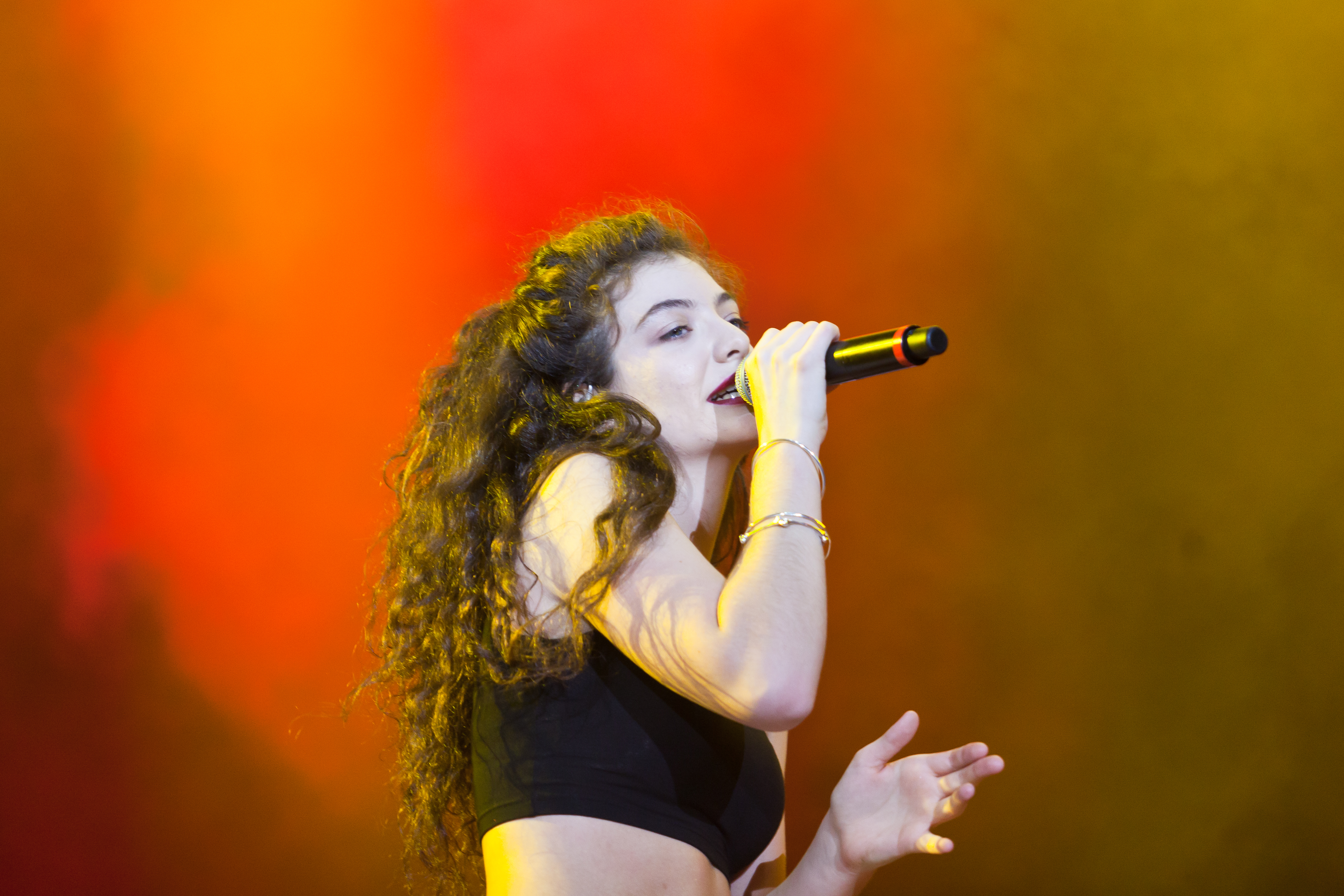
Lorde performing at Lollapalooza 2014 in Chicago

To promote her works to American audiences, Lorde held her first US show at Le Poisson Rouge in New York on 6 August 2013 and performed "Tennis Court" among songs from The Love Club EP. She subsequently included the song on the set list for her debut concert Pure Heroine Tour, which ran from late 2013 throughout 2014 in support of her debut studio album. On 13 November 2013, Lorde performed "Tennis Court" among five other songs from The Love Club and Pure Heroine on Live on Letterman. Six days later, Lorde held her first UK concert at Soho, London, where she performed several tracks from Pure Heroine including "Tennis Court". She also performed the track during the "Almost Acoustic Christmas" event on KROQ-FM radio station on 9 December.

Lorde performed "Tennis Court" at the 2014 Billboard Music Awards in May. The following month, she performed a medley of "Tennis Court" and "Team" at the 2014 MuchMusic Video Awards. Lorde also performed the song during several music festivals, including the Coachella Valley Music and Arts Festival in Indio, California, the Laneway Festival in Sydney, Lollapalooza Brazil in São Paulo. At the Lollapalooza Festival in Grant Park, Chicago on 1 August 2014, she performed the track among other songs from Pure Heroine. Billboard picked Lorde's performance as the fifth best of the festival, while Rolling Stone deemed her set list the highlight of the event. Lorde included "Tennis Court" on the set list of her Melodrama World Tour, which ran from September 2017 to November 2018.

== Usage and remixes ==
"Tennis Court" was played during the 2013 Wimbledon Championships – Women's Singles Final by the British Broadcasting Corporation (BBC). "Tennis Court" was remixed by Australian musician Flume in 2014. Noisey credited his remix as one of the earliest examples of a SoundCloud trend incorporating a "dizzy drop", described as "piercing flurries of stuttering synths and stomach-churning side-chain compression." In July 2014 American producer Diplo released his version, titled the Diplo's Andre Agassi Reebok Pump Mix. In 2014, "Tennis Court" was featured in the soundtrack of the PlayStation 4, Xbox One and Microsoft Windows versions of Grand Theft Auto V.

== Track listings ==
Australasian digital download and 7"
No.	Title	Length
1.	"Tennis Court"	3:18
2.	"Swingin Party"	3:42
Total length:		7:00

CD single
No.	Title	Length
1.	"Tennis Court"	3:18
2.	"White Teeth Teens"	3:36
Total length:		6:54

New Zealand digital download
No.	Title	Length
1.	"Royals"	3:10
2.	"Tennis Court"	3:18
Total length:		6:28

Tennis Court EP
No.	Title	Length
1.	"Tennis Court"	3:18
2.	"Swingin Party"	3:42
3.	"Biting Down"	3:33
4.	"Bravado"	3:41
Total length:		14:14

== Charts ==
=== Weekly charts ===
Chart (2013–14)	Peak position
Australia (ARIA)	20
Belgium (Ultratip Bubbling Under Flanders)	4
Belgium (Ultratip Bubbling Under Wallonia)	28
Canada Hot 100 (Billboard)	78
Canada CHR/Top 40 (Billboard)	38
Canada Hot AC (Billboard)	49
Canada Rock (Billboard)	41
France (SNEP)	193
Germany (GfK)	83
Iceland (RÚV)	17
Netherlands (Tipparade)	19
New Zealand (Recorded Music NZ)	1
UK Singles (Official Charts)	78
US Billboard Hot 100	71
US Hot Rock & Alternative Songs (Billboard)	9
US Pop Airplay (Billboard)	23

=== Year-end charts ===
Chart (2013)	Position
Australia (ARIA)	72
New Zealand (Recorded Music NZ)	19
US Hot Rock Songs (Billboard)	30

Chart (2014)	Position
US Hot Rock Songs (Billboard)	21

== Certifications ==
Region	Certification	Certified units/sales
Australia (ARIA)	5× Platinum	350,000^{‡}
Brazil (Pro-Música Brasil)	Platinum	60,000^{‡}
Canada (Music Canada)	2× Platinum	160,000^{‡}
New Zealand (RMNZ)	3× Platinum	45,000^{*}
Norway (IFPI Norway)	Platinum	10,000^{‡}
Sweden (GLF)	Gold	20,000^{‡}
United Kingdom (BPI)	Gold	400,000^{‡}
United States (RIAA)	2× Platinum	2,000,000^{‡}
^{*} Sales figures based on certification alone.^{‡} Sales+streaming figures based on certification alone.

== Release history ==
Region	Date	Format	Label	Catalogue no.	Ref.
Australia	7 June 2013	Digital download	Universal	—N/a	
New Zealand	7 June 2013	Digital download	Universal	—N/a	
Various	7 June 2013	Digital download (EP)	Universal	—N/a	
United Kingdom	22 July 2013	10-inch vinyl (EP)	Virgin EMI	3747360	
Germany	27 August 2013	7-inch vinyl single	Universal	Unknown	
United States	27 August 2013	7-inch vinyl single	Lava; Republic	B0018886-21	
New Zealand	4 April 2014	Digital download (Note: Double A-side digital download with "Royals")	Universal	—N/a	
United States	21 April 2014	Hot adult contemporary	Lava; Republic	—N/a	
United States	22 April 2014	Contemporary hit radio	Lava; Republic	—N/a	
Italy	25 April 2014	Contemporary hit radio	Universal	—N/a	
United Kingdom	12 May 2014	Contemporary hit radio	Virgin EMI	—N/a	
Germany	30 May 2014	CD single	Universal	0602537874958	
Switzerland	30 May 2014	CD single	Universal	0602537874958	

== See also ==
- List of number-one singles from the 2010s (New Zealand)
