= Bravado (song) =

Promotional single by Lorde

from the EP The Love Club EP and Tennis Court EP
- Released: 6 September 2013
- Studio: Golden Age (Morningside, Auckland)
- Genre: Chamber pop; electropop
- Length: 3:41
- Label: Universal
- Songwriters: Ella Yelich-O'Connor; Joel Little
- Producer: Joel Little

"Bravado" is a song by New Zealand singer-songwriter Lorde, originally included on her debut EP The Love Club EP. It was later featured on her Tennis Court EP and the extended version of her debut album Pure Heroine (2013). The song was written by Lorde herself, alongside Joel Little, and was produced by the latter. It was recorded at Little's Golden Age Studios, based in Morningside, Auckland. Characterised as a chamber pop and electropop record, "Bravado" addresses Lorde's introverted nature and the need to feign confidence in the music industry.

The track was released as a promotional single through Universal Records on the 6th of September, 2013, via iTunes Stores, in a number of European countries and India. The song was previously released on both Lorde's debut extended play (EP) The Love Club EP and her second EP, Tennis Court EP. The track was well received by music critics and peaked at number five on the New Zealand Artists Singles Chart and number 29 on the Billboard Hot Rock & Alternative Songs chart in the United States. It was also certified Gold by the Australian Recording Industry Association (ARIA) for equivalent sales of 35,000 units in the country.

== Background and composition ==
"Bravado"
A chamber pop and electropop song, "Bravado" describes Lorde's guise of confidence

"Bravado" was written by Lorde (credited under her birth-name Ella Yelich-O'Connor) and Joel Little, while production for the song was handled by the latter. The track was written and recorded in 2012 at Little's Golden Age Studios in Auckland. Within a week, Lorde had finished recording "Bravado" alongside "Royals" and "Biting Down" during a school break. Chris Schulz, from The New Zealand Herald, described "Bravado" as a chamber pop piece, while The Village Voice's Brittany Spanos called it an electropop song.

Running for a duration of 3:41 (three minutes and 41 seconds), the track is composed on electronic beats in the key of B minor and plays in common time at a moderate tempo of 88 beats per minute. Lorde's vocal range on the song spans from F♯_{3} to D_{5}. The lyrics of "Bravado" address the idea "of false confidence delivering real confidence" and of Lorde stepping into a line of work where, she said, "everyone would be watching me, and everyone would want to talk to me and confront me". Lorde cited the line "Me found bravery in my bravado" from Kanye West's 2010 song "Dark Fantasy" as an influence. Simon Collins, of The West Australian, called "Bravado" a particularly prescient song, preempting Lorde's rise to prominence. At a point of the song, Lorde confesses "to a battle between shyness and show-business aspirations":

"I learned not to want
The quiet of the room with no one around to find me out
I want the applause, the approval, the things that make me go oh."

== Promotion and reception ==
On 6 September 2013, "Bravado" was released as a digital download single on iTunes Stores in India and various European countries. Lorde held a concert at Le Poisson Rouge in New York, which was her first U.S. live show, and performed the song among other tracks from The Love Club EP. On 3 October 2013, the singer held a concert at the Warsaw Venue in Brooklyn and performed the song among other tracks from the album. In November 2013, Lorde performed the song on the Late Show with David Letterman to promote The Love Club EP and Pure Heroine. Throughout the show, she was only backed by a drummer and a keyboard player. "Bravado" was additionally performed during Lorde's debut concert tour throughout 2013 and 2014. In 2014, she performed the track at Silo Park, Auckland on 29 January 2014 as part of her make-up show for the 2014 Laneway Festival, and at the Brazil edition of the Lollapalooza.

"Bravado" was well received by music critics. Chris Schulz from The New Zealand Herald picked the song and "Million Dollar Bills" as the two best tracks from The Love Club EP. Jason Lipshutz, writing for Billboard, described the track as "delightfully spooky". In a review published in The Dominion Post, Tom Cardy compared the track's style to that of works by Florence Welch and Marina Diamandis, labelling it a "sharp, refreshing and smart" song. The song peaked at number five on the New Zealand National Singles and number twenty-nine on the US Hot Rock Songs chart.

== Weekly charts ==
| Chart (2013) | Peak position |
|---|---|
| New Zealand Artist Singles (Recorded Music NZ) | 5 |
| US Hot Rock & Alternative Songs (Billboard) | 29 |

== Certifications ==
Certifications for "Bravado"
| Region | Certification | Certified units/sales |
|---|---|---|
| Australia (ARIA) | Gold | 35,000^{‡} |
| New Zealand (RMNZ) | Gold | 7,500^{*} |
^{*} Sales figures based on certification alone.^{‡} Sales+streaming figures based on certification alone.

== Release history ==
| Country | Date | Format | Label |
|---|---|---|---|
| Austria | 6 September 2013 | Digital download | Universal |
| Belgium | 6 September 2013 | Digital download | Universal |
| Finland | 6 September 2013 | Digital download | Universal |
| Germany | 6 September 2013 | Digital download | Universal |
| India | 6 September 2013 | Digital download | Universal |
| Luxembourg | 6 September 2013 | Digital download | Universal |
| Netherlands | 6 September 2013 | Digital download | Universal |
| Portugal | 6 September 2013 | Digital download | Universal |
| Switzerland | 6 September 2013 | Digital download | Universal |
