= Pure Heroine =

2013 studio album by Lorde

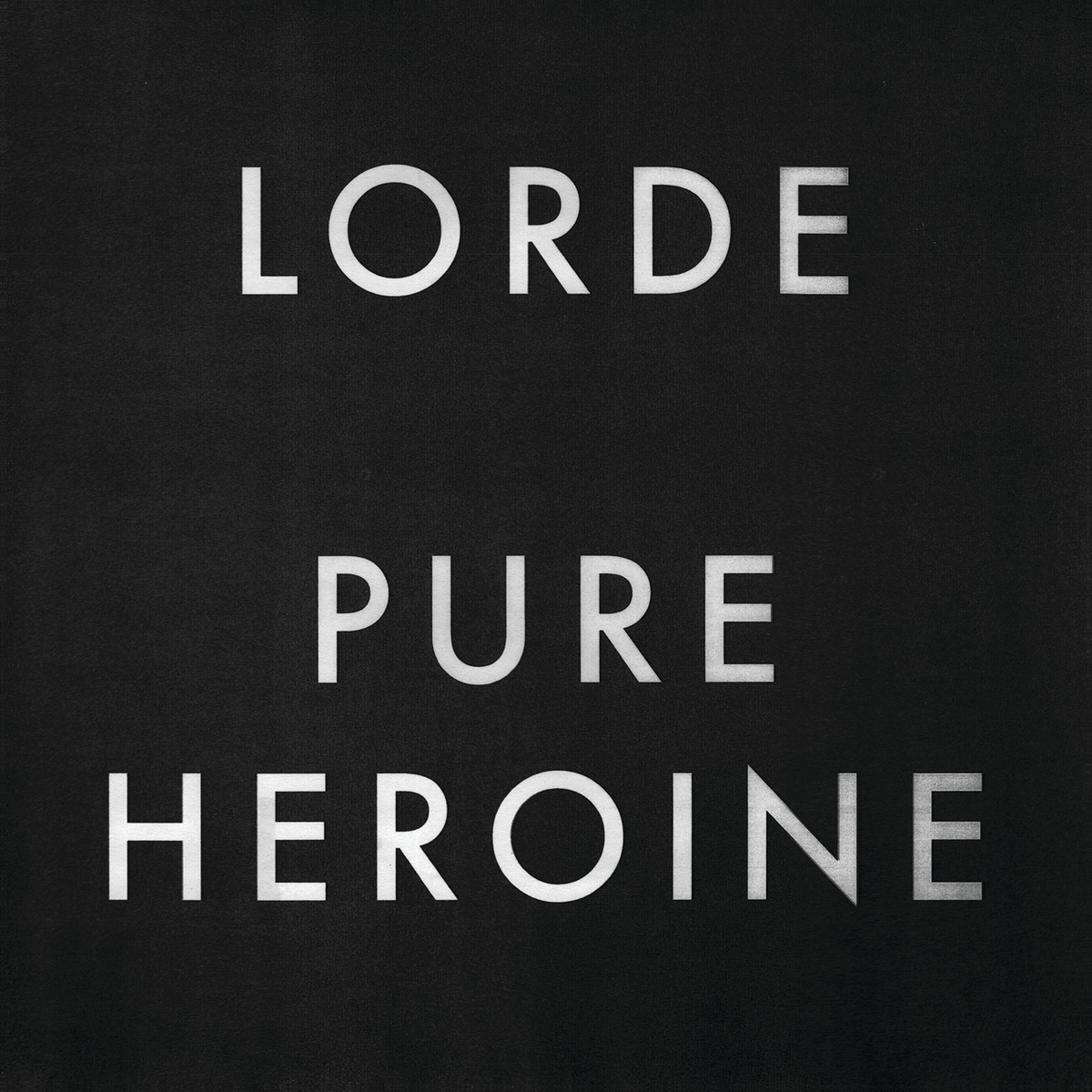
- Standard edition cover artwork

Studio album by Lorde
- Released: 27 September 2013
- Recorded: 2012–2013
- Studios: Golden Age (Auckland, New Zealand)
- Genres: Electronica; dream pop; electropop
- Length: 37:07
- Labels: Universal; Lava; Republic
- Producers: Joel Little; Lorde

Lorde chronology
| The Love Club EP (2012) | Pure Heroine (2013) | The Hunger Games: Mockingjay – Part 1 (Original Motion Picture Soundtrack) (2014) |

Singles from Pure Heroine
- 1. "Royals" Released: 3 June 2013; 2. "Tennis Court" Released: 7 June 2013; 3. "Team" Released: 13 September 2013; 4. "Glory and Gore" Released: 11 March 2014

Pure Heroine is the debut studio album by New Zealand singer-songwriter Lorde. It was released on 27 September 2013 by Universal, Lava, and Republic Records. After several unsuccessful sessions with songwriters, Lorde was paired with Joel Little by A&R representative Scott Maclachlan, who assisted with the album's production. Recording took place at Golden Age Studios in Auckland. Pure Heroine has been described as an electronica, electropop, and dream pop album with minimalist production, deep bass and programmed beats.

Pure Heroine received generally positive reviews from music critics, many of whom praised its songwriting, production, and Lorde's vocal performance. It appeared on several year-end critics' lists, and was nominated for Best Pop Vocal Album at the 56th Annual Grammy Awards. The album deals with themes of youth and critiques mainstream culture, exploring materialism, fame, consumer culture and social status. Pure Heroine has been noted for its influence on modern pop music.

Lorde released the album's lead single, "Royals", to critical and commercial success; it was followed by "Tennis Court", "Team" and "Glory and Gore". The album debuted at number three on the US Billboard 200 chart, selling 129,0000 album-equivalent units, and topped the charts in Australia and New Zealand. Pure Heroine was one of 2014's best-selling albums. It was certified nine-times platinum in New Zealand, platinum in the United Kingdom, Germany, and France, four-times platinum in Australia, and six-times platinum in Canada and by the Recording Industry Association of America, selling more than 5 million copies worldwide.

== Background and development ==
Since she was 14 years old, Lorde worked with Universal to develop her sound and artistic vision. She was signed to Universal by her manager, Scott Maclachlan, at age 13 and was paired with a succession of songwriters in unsuccessful attempts to develop her own music. Maclachlan told HitQuarters, "Fundamentally I think she understood that she was going to write her own music but would need someone to help with the production side of it." Lorde began writing songs on guitar at the age of "13 or 14". She was eventually paired with New Zealand writer and producer Joel Little in December 2011, and their working relationship clicked almost immediately. Lorde's debut extended play (2013's The Love Club EP) was praised by music critics, who compared the EP to work by other female alternative pop artists such as Sky Ferreira, Florence and the Machine, Lana Del Rey, and Grimes. It reached number one in New Zealand, number two in Australia, where it was certified five times platinum for shipments of 350,000 copies, and number twenty-three on the US Billboard 200.

Before beginning work on Pure Heroine, Lorde said that she intended her debut album to be a "cohesive" work. Like The Love Club EP, Pure Heroine was recorded with producer Joel Little at Golden Age Studios, a small studio without expensive technology, in Auckland, and was completed in less than a year. Initially, Lorde and Little played demos to A&R Scott Maclachlan in which they discussed songs, exchanged comments and changed aspects of the songs. She later showed the lyrics to James Lowe, her boyfriend at the time, saying that sharing things with him inspired her to write most of the album. Recording of the album was overseen by Lorde and Little, and was described by Maclachlan as a fairly-short process; most of what Lorde played for him ended up on the album. Lorde wanted to write her own music, and the album's content was co-written with Little. Ten songs were included in the album's final track listing, with seven or eight tracks not making the cut. Lorde and Maclachlan decided to keep the final track listing at ten to avoid "filler material."

== Music and lyrics ==
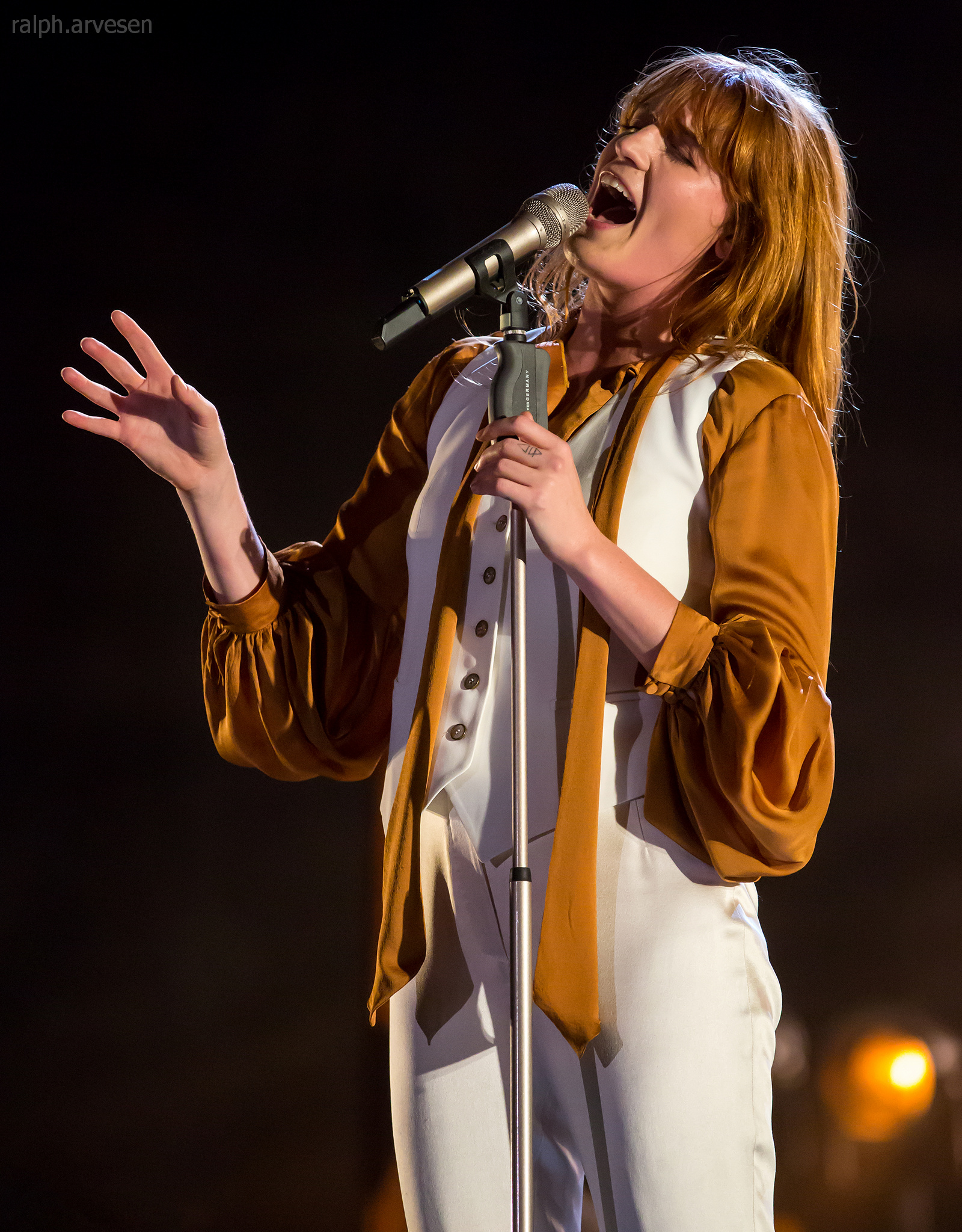
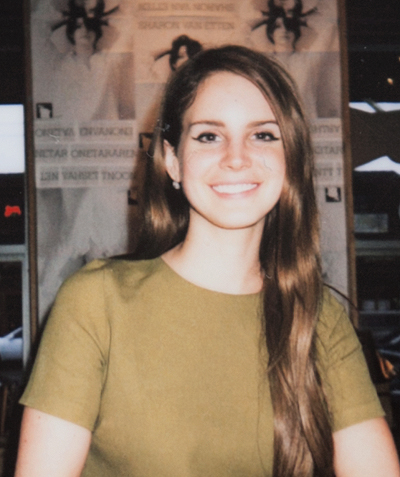
Pure Heroine was compared to the works of female artists such as Florence Welch (pictured left) and Lana Del Rey (right).

Lorde's vocals on Pure Heroine have been noted for her range and powerful delivery. She said that she felt it essential for her voice to be the album's focus, since she was unfamiliar with playing instruments. The A.V. Club editor Kevin McFarland called the singer's voice the "alpha and omega of her talent. ... Her voice isn't booming or overpowering, but rather mystifying and alluring, both floating on its own in a sea of reverb and digital blips and awash in an army of chorused overdubs." PopMatters's Evan Sawdey described Lorde's vocals as being "unique and powerfully intriguing", while Billboard noted her vocals for being "smoky and restrained".

The album is built around Little's production, which incorporates deep bass, loops, and programmed beats. During its recording, Lorde said that she "didn't really have a specific sound in mind". She cited James Blake and minimalist music as the main inspirations for Pure Heroine. The album's song structures were influenced by hip hop, electronic and pop music as the singer listened to those genres to develop a "real taste" of the direction the production would follow. Several publications noted its minimalist production, and compared its arrangements to singers such as Robyn and Santigold. Pure Heroine has been described by critics as an electronica, dream pop, and electropop album.

The album deals with themes of youth, and critiques mainstream culture, exploring materialism, fame, consumer culture, and social status. Classic teen pop themes such as social anxiety, romance, and "adolescent aggrievance and angst" are also present on the album. According to NME, its lyrics indicate that Lorde is "bored". In an interview with the magazine, she said that she used words of inclusion (such as "we" and "us") throughout the album. The singer's lyrics detail "the mundanity of teenage life" and celebrate the "often ignored intelligence of the next generation." Lorde also uses metaphors involving teeth, describing the "Hollywood smile", which several publications related to social class structures and economic inequality. In an analysis piece from i-D, writer Wendy Syfret states that Pure Heroine presented suburban dreams and a realistic teenage life, saying the record is "perhaps the most direct and eloquent statement about the eternal teen juxtaposition of wanting it all ... but knowing deep down that to leave this stage is to make an exit you can never undo."

== Songs ==
=== Tracks 1–5 ===
External image
- The 1976 photograph of baseball player George Brett by photographer Ted Spiegel that inspired Lorde to write "Royals".

The album's opening track, "Tennis Court", addresses Lorde's new fame and criticises the "high life." Described by critics as a downtempo hip hop and EDM-influenced alternative pop, art pop and electropop song, it uses synthesisers and electronic pulses in its arrangement. Little and Lorde first wrote the music and beat, and the lyrics were written later. "400 Lux", named for the brightness of a sunrise or sunset, was interpreted by critics as the album's first love song, with lyrics detailing suburban life. Lipshutz of Billboard described its instrumentation as "over canyon-sized bass and popping percussion".

Lorde wrote the lyrics to "Royals" in half an hour and recorded the song within a week during a school break. She was inspired after seeing a photo by Ted Spiegel in the July 1976 issue of National Geographic of Kansas City Royals player George Brett signing baseballs, with his team's name (Royals) emblazoned across his shirt. Although Lorde was also inspired by historic aristocrats and hip hop-influenced artists such as Jay-Z, Kanye West and Lana Del Rey when writing the song, she criticised their "bullshit" references to "expensive" alcohol and cars. Lorde cited her fear of ageing and a party she threw at her house while her parents were away as the main inspirations behind "Ribs", described by critics as a deep house-influenced electronica and electropop song. "Buzzcut Season", influenced by tropical music, uses a xylophone in its instrumentation. Its lyrics, describing the "ridiculousness of modern life", include themes of refuge and reassurance.

=== Tracks 6–10 ===
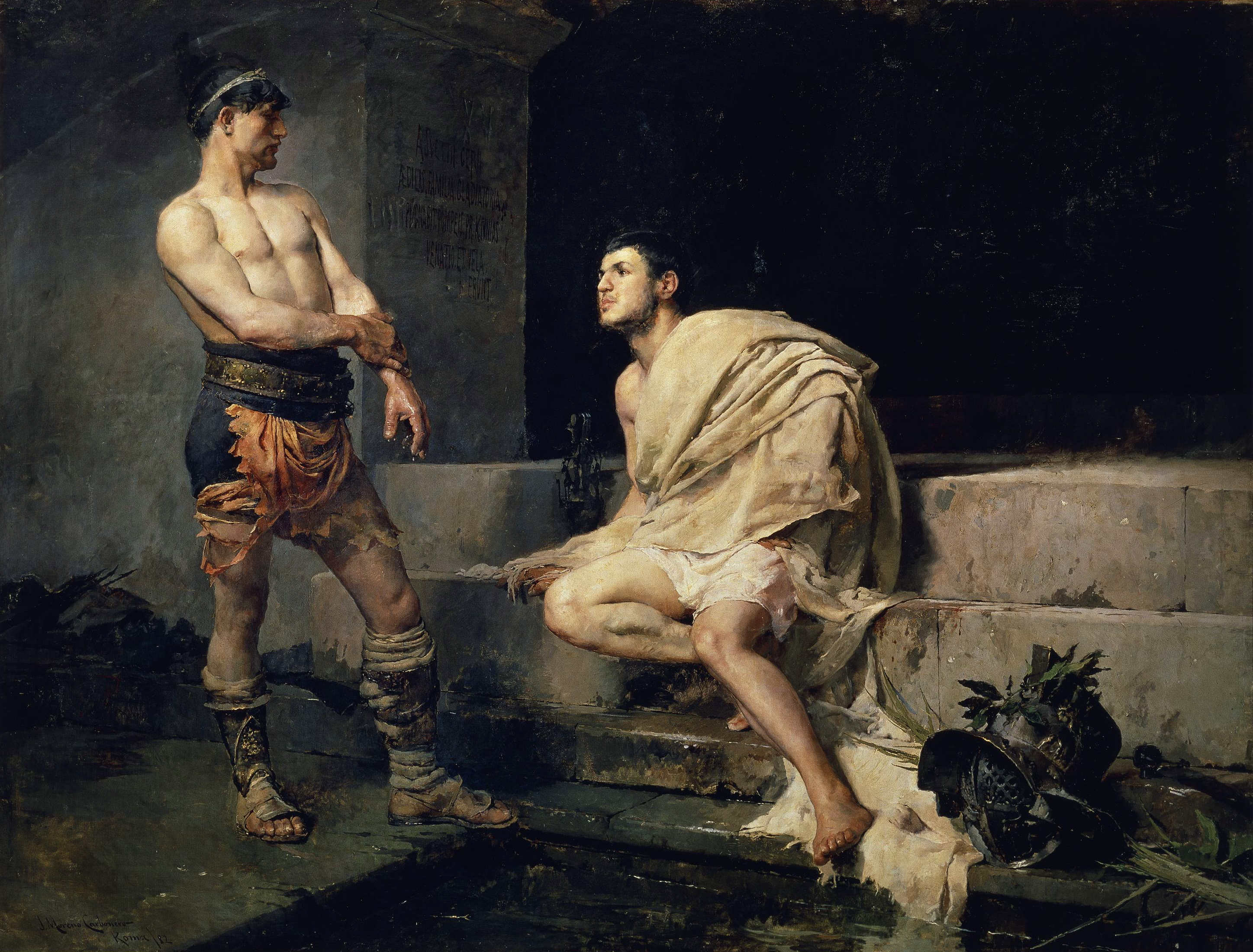
"Glory and Gore" uses black satire and compares celebrity culture to gladiatoral combat.

The album's sixth song, "Team", is a hybrid alternative pop and electro-hop song which features synthesiser, bass, and snare drum instrumentation over a handclap-based beat. Written when Lorde was travelling the world, the song was a "tribute to her friends and country". The next song, "Glory and Gore" is a chillwave and hip hop-influenced electropop ballad with pulsing synthesisers. Lorde uses black satire throughout the song to express disdain for the modern emphasis on violence, and compares celebrity culture to gladiatorial combat.

"Still Sane" is a spare ballad, with lyrics grappling with Lorde's "ambition and fears of how fame will affect her." "White Teeth Teens", influenced by doo-wop music, incorporates military drums with lyrics detailing the differences between the appearance and true character of a white-toothed teen. In a PopMatters analysis, Scott Interrante describes the use of teeth in the song's lyrics as "preppy, popular teens, using their white teeth as their defining characteristic." "A World Alone", the album's closing track, was described as a "dark disco diamond". It begins with a "lonely guitar note" before transitioning into a "roaring dance beat". The song's final line, "Let 'em talk", was cited by critics as a call and response to the album's opening line, "Don't you think that it's boring how people talk?" in "Tennis Court".

== Promotion ==
Lorde posted the album's release date along with its cover art and track listing to her Twitter account on 12 August 2013. The album's release was preceded by an advertising campaign which had the lyrics of her songs displayed on buses and shop windows and faxed to media outlets. On 23 September 2013, "Buzzcut Season" was released as a promotional single in several iTunes Stores in Asia. "Ribs" was subsequently offered as the free single of the week on the iTunes Store during the week of the album's release. An extended version of the album was released on 13 December 2013, featuring "No Better", previously released as a free promotional single, and five tracks from The Love Club EP. (Note: The tracks from The Love Club EP that were featured on the extended version of Pure Heroine include: "Bravado", "Million Dollar Bills", "The Love Club", "Biting Down" and "Swingin Party". "Royals" was included on the original New Zealand release of the EP but was not duplicated.)

To promote the album, Lorde did several performances worldwide. She made her first televised performance in the United States on Late Night with Jimmy Fallon, performing "Royals" and "White Teeth Teens". Lorde replaced Frank Ocean, who cancelled due to illness, at the 2013 Splendour in the Grass Festival. In September 2013, Lorde appeared on New Zealand's 3rd Degree and performed on Later... with Jools Holland. Two months later, Lorde performed several songs from the album and her EP on Live with Letterman and at a concert the singer held at the Warsaw Venue in Brooklyn. She further promoted the album by performing "Royals" on The Ellen DeGeneres Show on 9 October 2013. The singer also performed "Team" at the 2013 ARIA Awards and opened the 2013 New Zealand Music Awards with "Royals". At the 56th Annual Grammy Awards, Lorde performed a stripped-down version of the song.

=== Tour ===
The album received further promotion from her first headlining concert tour, the Pure Heroine Tour, which started on 28 July 2013 in Byron Bay, Australia. It was Lorde's first concert tour with North American shows in August, followed by two dates in Europe. The singer returned to North America to perform in eight additional shows before flying to Australia for six shows. In 2014, Lorde performed an additional 40 shows in North America, 19 in Asia, 6 in Europe and 3 in South America. 9 Oceania dates were cancelled; one due to scheduling conflict and 8 for a chest infection she was diagnosed with.

The set list consisted of songs from The Love Club EP and Pure Heroine. Lorde appeared on stage with new outfits to accommodate the mood of the songs. The singer performed most of her songs in a silhouette; her face was frequently hidden from the crowd. She also premiered an unreleased song called "Good Fights". It received positive critical reception with critics complementing her vocal clarity, stage presence and minimalist setting.

=== Singles ===
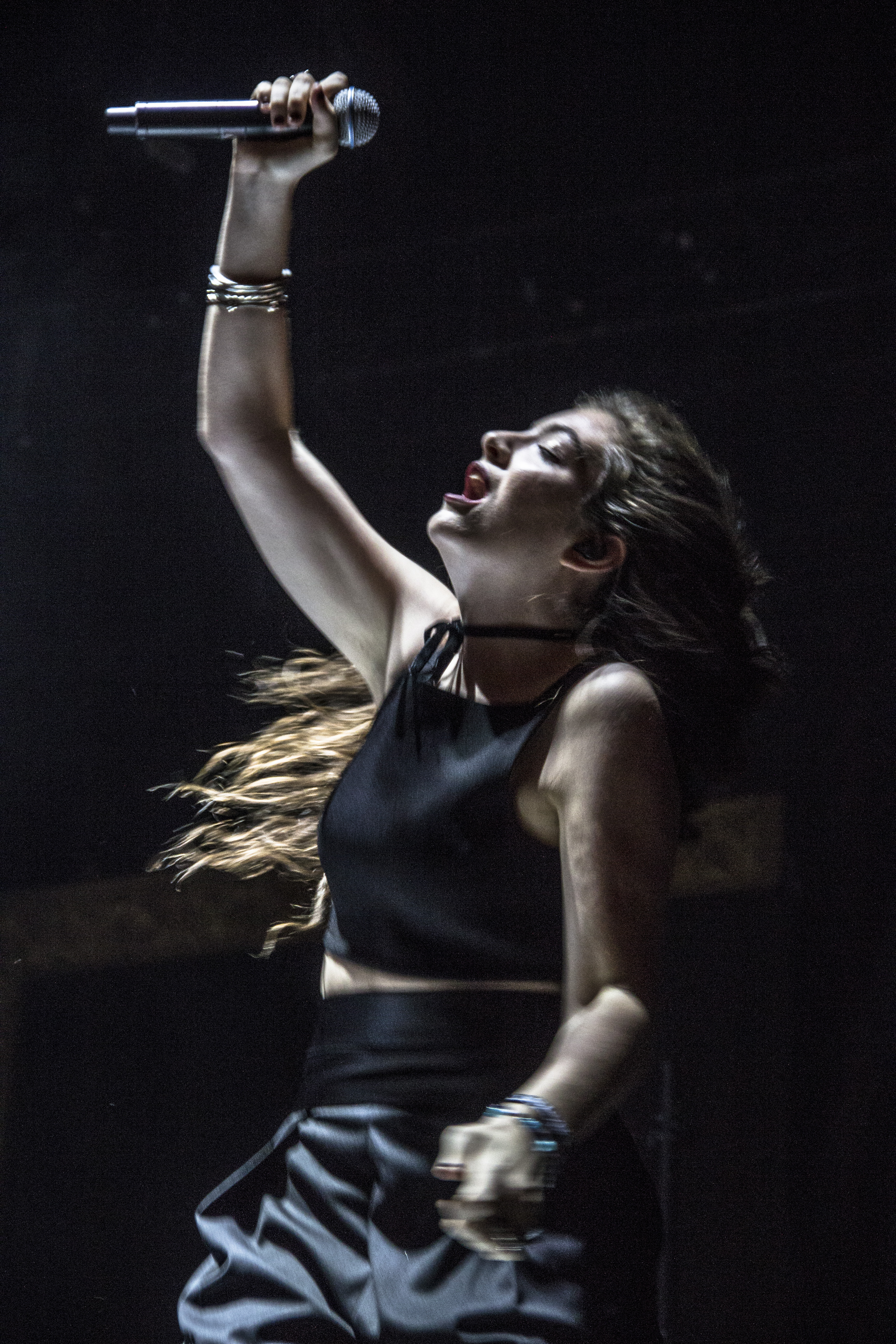
Lorde performing at the Boston Calling Music Festival

"Royals" was released as the album's lead single on 3 June 2013, through digital distribution. The song received widespread acclaim with reviewers complimenting its minimalist production and lyrics. It achieved commercial success by topping the charts in New Zealand, Canada, the Republic of Ireland, the United Kingdom and the United States. She became the youngest artist to top the Billboard Hot 100 chart since Tiffany's "I Think We're Alone Now" (1987) and the first New Zealand act to reach number one as a lead artist. The song received three Grammy nominations for Record of the Year, Song of the Year and Best Pop Solo Performance, winning in the latter two categories.

"Tennis Court" was released as the second single from the album. It was also well-received from critics, most of whom praised the song's production and musical style. To promote the song, Lorde released an accompanying EP of the same name through digital stores in the United Kingdom on 7 June 2013 and a physical CD single on 22 June 2013. It performed modestly on international charts, debuting at number one in New Zealand and charting in Canada, the United Kingdom and the United States.

"Team" was announced as the third single from the album. It was leaked by Australian radio station Triple J on 12 September and as a result, the single was released digitally in Australia and New Zealand on 13 September. The single became available in the United States on 13 September as part of the pre-order for Pure Heroine. The song was critically acclaimed by critics who praised its catchy production and "club-ready" atmosphere. "Team" was a commercial success, reaching the top 10 in New Zealand, Canada, Mexico, and the United States.

"Glory and Gore" was released as the album's fourth and final single on 11 March 2014 after being sent to US modern rock radio. The song received mixed reviews. Some praised its hook while others criticised its forced lyrics and production. It failed to match the success of the previous singles, charting outside the top 10 in New Zealand, and at low-tier positions in Australia and the United States.

== Critical reception ==
Professional ratings
Aggregate scores
| Source | Rating |
|---|---|
| AnyDecentMusic? | 7.6/10 |
| Metacritic | 79/100 |
Review scores
| Source | Rating |
| AllMusic | 3/5 stars |
| The A.V. Club | B+ |
| Entertainment Weekly | A− |
| The Guardian | 4/5 stars |
| The Independent | 3/5 stars |
| NME | 6/10 |
| Pitchfork | 7.3/10 |
| Q | 4/5 stars |
| Rolling Stone | 4/5 stars |
| Spin | 6/10 |

Pure Heroine received generally positive reviews from critics; aggregating website Metacritic reports a normalized rating of 79, based on 28 reviews. Jason Lipshutz of Billboard described it as "immaculate" and an "exploration into the soul of a quiet girl in the Internet age, trying to feel something and not envy everything." In his favourable A− review, Ray Rahman of Entertainment Weekly said the album's production, vocal performance and lyricism "signals the arrival of a new kind of star." In contrast, Spin reviewer Maura Johnston suggested that Lorde used her age as a "clumsy ploy", declaring her music "aggressively okay" and washed in "(possibly fake) teen-pop-star ennui". Lindsay Zoladz, writing for Pitchfork, described Lorde as a "correspondent on the front lines of elegantly wasted post-digital youth culture and working-class suburban boredom".

James Reed of The Boston Globe said Pure Heroine was similar to the production aesthetic of R&B singers the Weeknd and Jessie Ware. PopMatters's Evan Sawdey suggested that the "album's production... [evokes] an ethereal, nighttime soundscape that just so happens to congeal into sturdy pop songs, sometimes in exciting, unexpected ways." The New Zealand Herald's Lydia Jenkin concluded, "[Lorde's] knack for combining her insights, with strong phrasing, and ear-worm phonaesthetics ... make her a musical heroine ... The impressive level of self-awareness is what makes her youthful commentary so compelling." Conversely, Adam Offitzer of Pretty Much Amazing awarded the album a B grade, asserting it was "no masterpiece", but engaging enough to keep Lorde relevant. Robert Christgau gave the album a two-star honourable mention and said, "Her ambition's in the right place, but the reason she always co-writes is that 16-year-olds don't just crank out hits."

Pure Heroine was named the best album of 2013 by FasterLouder, The Herald Sun, The Mercury News, and The New York Times. It featured highly in other end-of-year best album lists: at number two by Entertainment Weekly, at number four by Billboard, at number four by Slant, at number seven by Rolling Stone, and at number ten by The A.V. Club. The record featured at number 25 in The Village Voice's 2013 Pazz & Jop critics' poll, with 317 points. Metacritic ranked it the fifth best-reviewed album of 2013, with 34 points. In 2014, Pure Heroine was named Album of the Year and Best Pop Album at the New Zealand Music Awards, and was awarded the Taite Music Prize. It was nominated for Best Pop Vocal Album at the 56th Annual Grammy Awards.

== Commercial performance ==
The album debuted atop the Official New Zealand Chart, and was certified platinum in its first week; it remained at number one for the following two weeks. After eleven weeks on the chart, Pure Heroine rebounded to number two and was certified triple platinum. At week eighteen, it rose from number three to number one and was certified quadruple platinum. The album also debuted at number one on Australia's ARIA Chart. It then fell to number two, but was certified gold by the Australian Recording Industry Association (ARIA). The album finished as the ninth highest-selling album of the year in the country with sales of about 100,000 copies.

Pure Heroine entered the Canadian Albums Chart at number two, with first-week sales of 15,000 copies, and was later certified platinum by Music Canada (MC) for shipments of 80,000 copies. The album sold 18,294 copies in its debut at number four on the Official Charts Company's UK Albums Chart, where it was later certified platinum by the British Phonographic Industry (BPI) for sales and streaming units equivalent to 300,000 copies.

It debuted at number three on the US Billboard 200, with first-week sales of 129,000 copies. In its second week on the chart the album fell to number six, with a 51-percent drop in sales to 63,000 copies. Pure Heroine fell to number seven in its third week, selling 48,000 copies, but rose to number five the following week and sold 40,000 copies. According to Nielsen Soundscan, the album sold 413,000 copies by 3 December 2013; by 19 December, it was certified gold by the Recording Industry Association of America (RIAA) for sales of 541,000 copies. Pure Heroine had a 14-percent US sales increase during the holiday season, selling 78,000 copies and moving from number eleven to number seven on the Billboard 200. On 9 January 2014, the album rose from seventh to fifth on the chart and sold a further 46,000 copies; it held its position the following week, selling 33,000 copies. In July 2014, Billboard released a mid-year chart; Pure Heroine was number four, selling 641,000 copies in the first half of the year. It was the sixth-bestselling album of 2014, selling 841,000 copies and 6.8 million tracks.

Pure Heroine had an 86-percent increase in sales after Lorde's performance at the 56th Annual Grammy Awards, rising from number five back to number three on the Billboard 200 and selling 68,000 copies. After slipping to number eight for the week ending 19 February, Pure Heroine rose to number seven with 39,000 copies sold (a nine-percent increase). It rose to number six the following week, selling 30,000 copies and passing the one-million mark with 1.01 million copies sold. Pure Heroine was the first debut album to reach the one-million mark since October 2013; Lorde was the first woman whose debut album sold a million copies since April 2011 and Adele's 19. According to the International Federation of the Phonographic Industry (IFPI), the album sold 1.4 million copies in 2013 and two million copies in 2014, with 3.4 million combined copies for both years.

== Impact and legacy ==
After its release, Pure Heroine was called a "game-changer". It was further praised by critics for its minimalist pop production and for challenging current pop trends. According to Paste, Pure Heroine expanded "what pop could sound like: exploratory, genre-fluid, and defiant of categorization and formula." Similarly, the Recording Academy also stated that the album "influenced a generation" and paved the way for the "unconventional modern superstar". English singer-songwriter David Bowie called her "the future of music", while Dave Grohl saw her as revolutionary.

The success of Pure Heroine affected Joel Little's career. According to The Guardian, the album's international success "thrust Little into the limelight". Billboard ranked him at number 33 on their list of the 50 Best Music Producers of the 21st Century. The publication listed Pure Heroine as Little's defining work. NME credits the album as forging a pop songwriter career for Little. Since the album's release, he has assisted in producing albums for a range of artists such as alternative-leaning acts Imagine Dragons, Noah Kahan, and Vance Joy, as well as pop-oriented musicians Taylor Swift, Shawn Mendes, Niall Horan, and Khalid.

Lorde opened the door for other smart, bold teen girls to say their peace and earn respect — not just in pop music, but in the world overall. Over the next several years, our culture saw a rise in young female musicians and actors like Billie Eilish, Amandla Stenberg, Zendaya, and Tavi Gevinson, girls who weren’t just accepted for speaking their minds and embracing their individuality, but celebrated for it.

— Shondaland, about Pure Heroine's influence on teen female personalities in the mainstream

Forbes placed Lorde on their 30 Under 30 list of young people "who are changing our world". She was the youngest person in the music category. Lorde also topped Time's list of the world's most influential teenagers; according to Time, she was "forging her own path." Forbes called Pure Heroine a "breakout success", with a "larger evolution on the horizon." Billboard also named Lorde "your new alt-rock heroine" in their September 2013 cover story.

Music publications have cited Pure Heroine as an influential album in mainstream pop music. Lindsay Zoladz from The Ringer indicated that the album's "impact [was] larger and harder to define because it completely rewrote the rules for young women making radio-friendly pop." The New Yorker's Carrie Battan echoed similar statements, arguing that the "pop scene—particularly for women—has altered radically since Pure Heroine was released", making it "almost unrecognizable from the sugary-sweet, overtly sexual realm of the early aughts."

Lorde's vocal performance on the album was credited by Peter Robinson of The Guardian for contributing to the rise of "whisperpop" in mainstream music, defined as "deceptively understated, intricate vocal performances" in vocalists; Robinson also noted that Lorde was one of several artists that inspired a "raft of major signings". Elle Hunt, writing for The Spinoff said the album's "almost conversational style of singing is now so ubiquitous, it's easy to forget it would not have been associated with pop ten years ago or fewer."

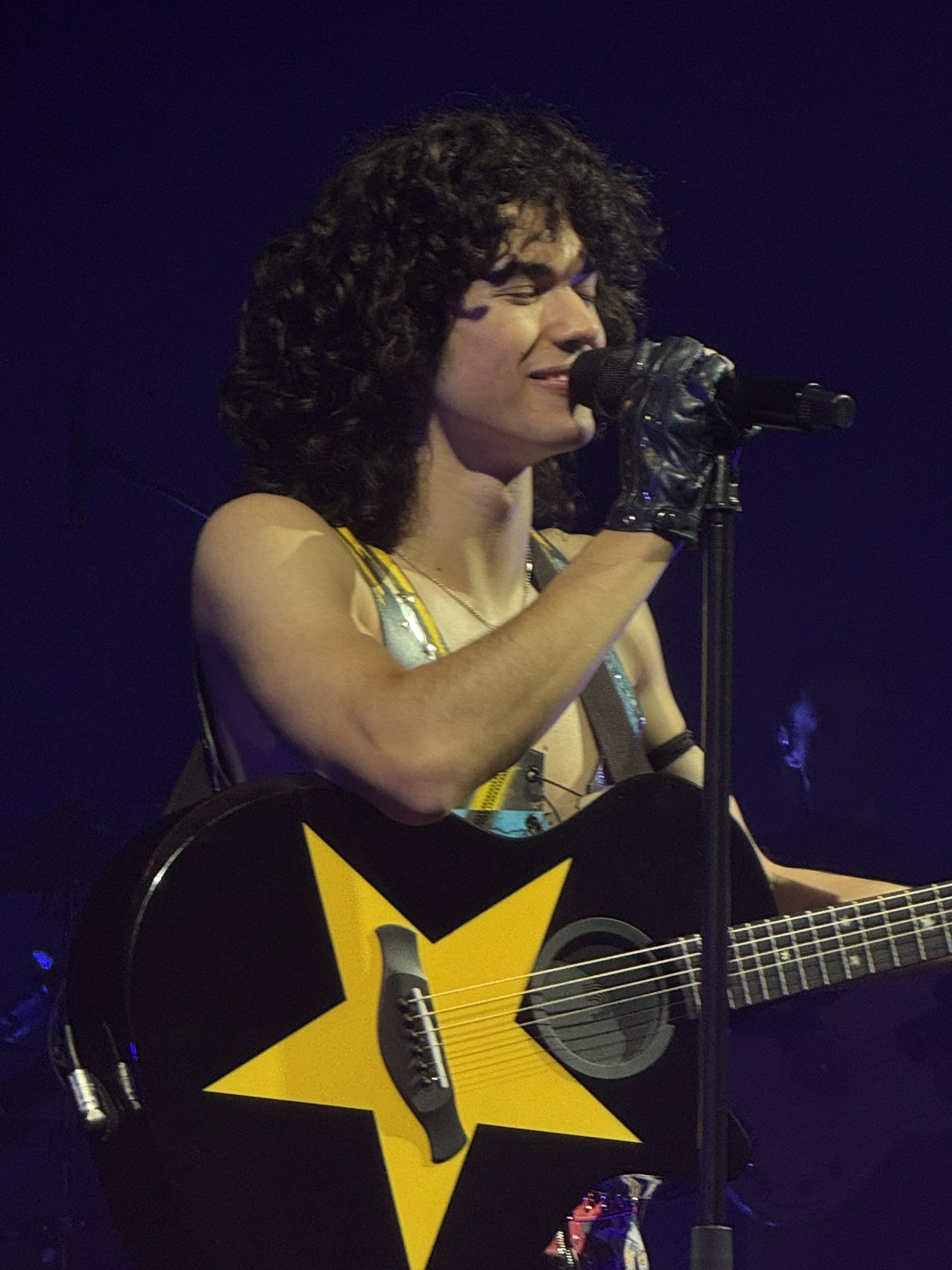
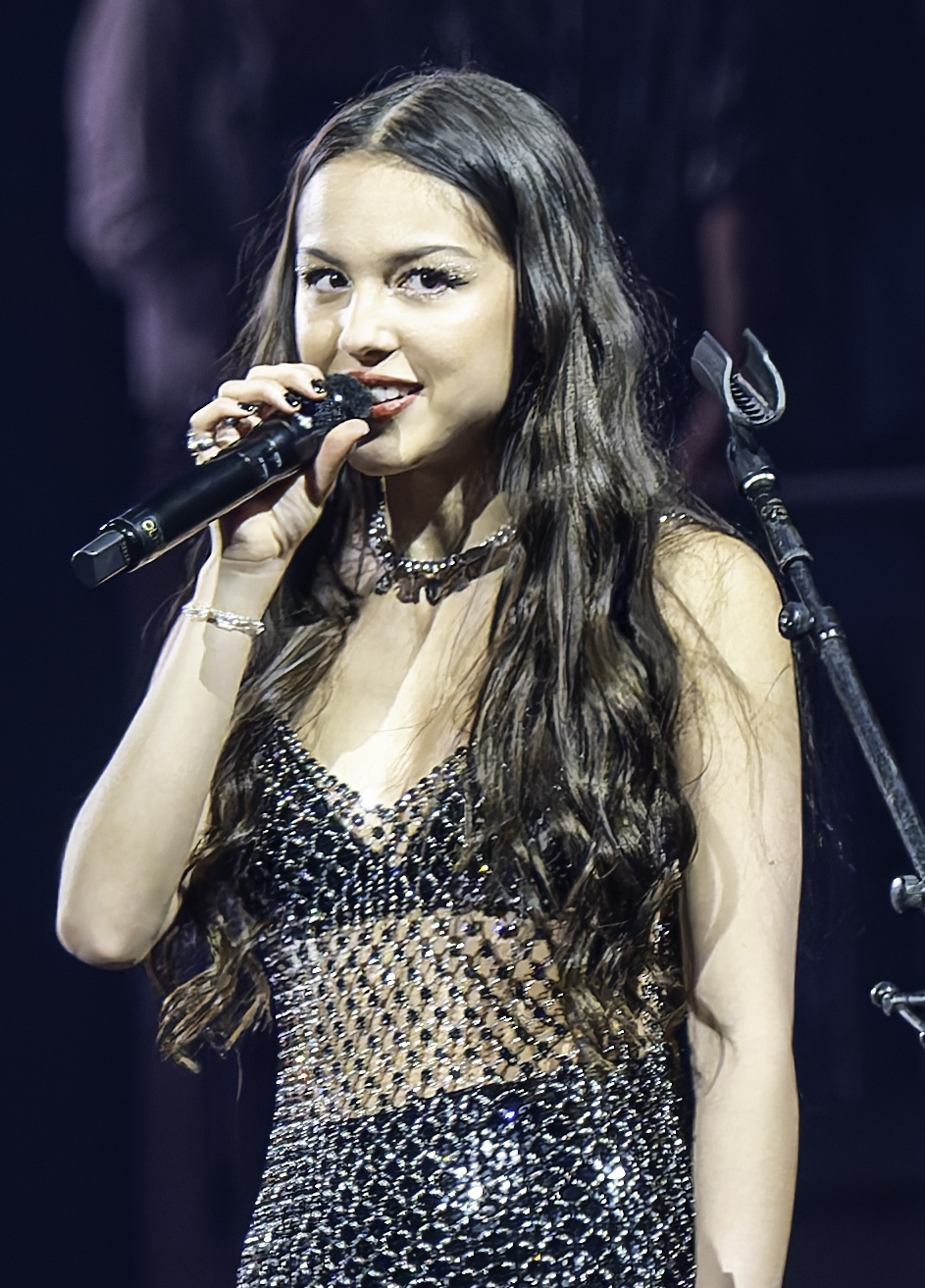
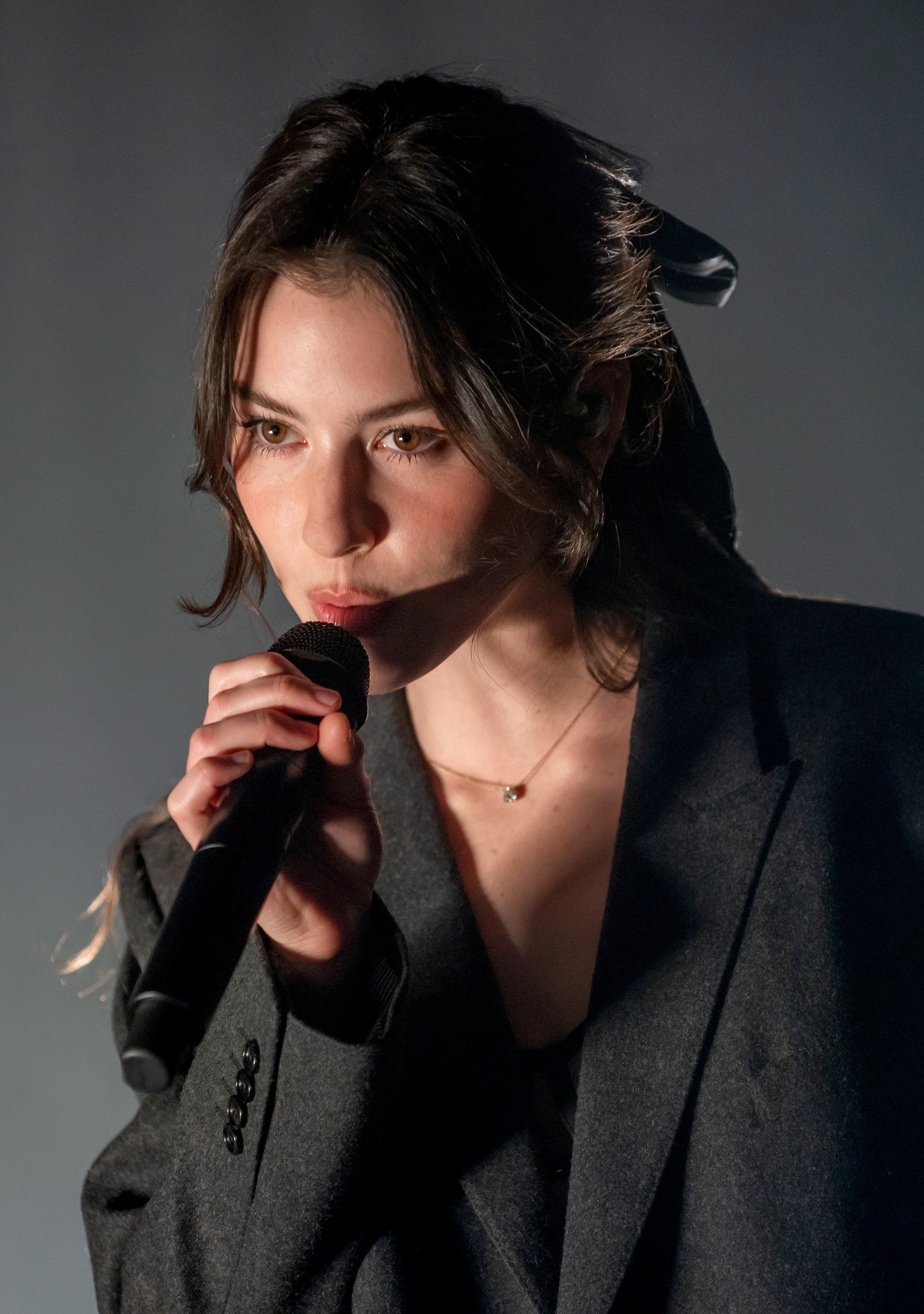
Artists such as Conan Gray (left), Olivia Rodrigo (middle), and Gracie Abrams (right) have cited Pure Heroine as an influence.

American singer Conan Gray cited Pure Heroine as a major source of inspiration while writing his debut EP Sunset Season (2018) and debut album Kid Krow (2020). He credits the album for starting his "obsession with pop music". In an interview with NME, American singer Olivia Rodrigo stated that the album served as inspiration for her debut single, "Drivers License" (2021). Australian singer Troye Sivan stated that his debut album, Blue Neighbourhood (2015), took inspiration from Pure Heroine, while American singer Gracie Abrams says the album "changed [her] life". Similarly, Australian singer Amy Shark considered the album a pivotal moment in helping her "find direction" for her sound. English duo Let's Eat Grandma selected Pure Heroine as one of their all-time favourite records and cited it as an influence on their 2018 album I'm All Ears. The Recording Academy notes that the album's "one writer, one producer" formula were adopted by American singers Billie Eilish and Olivia Rodrigo on their album releases.

Critical rankings for Pure Heroine
| Critic/Organization | Time span | Rank | Published year |
|---|---|---|---|
| Apple Music | All Time | 96 | 2024 |
| Atwood Magazine | Decade-end | * | 2019 |
| AudioCulture | All Time (New Zealand albums) | * | 2016 |
| Billboard | Decade-end | 23 | 2019 |
| Clash | 2004–2014 | 35 | 2014 |
| Genius | Decade-end | 50 | 2020 |
| Insider | Decade-end | 11 | 2019 |
| The Mercury News | Decade-end | 1 | 2019 |
| NME | Decade-end | 45 | 2019 |
| Paste | All Time (Debut albums) | 81 | 2023 |
| Paste | Decade-end (Pop albums) | 8 | 2019 |
| Paste | Decade-end | 60 | 2019 |
| Paste | 21st century (Debut albums) | 41 | 2023 |
| Paste | All Time (Released by teenagers) | 2 | 2017 |
| Radio New Zealand | 21st century (New Zealand albums) | 3 | 2019 |
| Rolling Stone | All Time (Debut albums) | 100 | 2022 |
| Slant | Decade-end | 31 | 2019 |
| The Spinoff | All Time (New Zealand albums) | * | 2023 |
| The Evening Standard | Decade-end | * | 2019 |
| Uproxx | Decade-end | 29 | 2019 |
| Yardbarker | 1969–2019 | * | 2019 |

== Track listing ==
All tracks written by Ella Yelich-O'Connor and Joel Little, and produced by Little, except where noted.

Pure Heroine – Standard version
| No. | Title | Length |
|---|---|---|
| 1. | "Tennis Court" | 3:18 |
| 2. | "400 Lux" | 3:54 |
| 3. | "Royals" | 3:10 |
| 4. | "Ribs" | 4:18 |
| 5. | "Buzzcut Season" | 4:06 |
| 6. | "Team" (producers: Little, Yelich-O'Connor^{[a]}) | 3:13 |
| 7. | "Glory and Gore" | 3:30 |
| 8. | "Still Sane" | 3:08 |
| 9. | "White Teeth Teens" | 3:36 |
| 10. | "A World Alone" (producers: Little, Yelich-O'Connor^{[a]}) | 4:54 |
| Total length: | | 37:07 |

Pure Heroine – Japanese version (bonus tracks)
| No. | Title | Length |
|---|---|---|
| 11. | "Bravado" | 3:41 |
| 12. | "Swingin Party" (writer: Paul Westerberg) | 3:42 |
| 13. | "Bravado" (Fffrrannno remix) | 3:43 |
| Total length: | | 48:13 |

Pure Heroine – Digital extended version (bonus tracks)
| No. | Title | Length |
|---|---|---|
| 11. | "No Better" (iTunes Store edition) | 2:50 |
| 12. | "Bravado" | 3:41 |
| 13. | "Million Dollar Bills" | 2:18 |
| 14. | "The Love Club" | 3:21 |
| 15. | "Biting Down" | 3:33 |
| 16. | "Swingin Party" (writer: Westerberg) | 3:42 |
| Total length: | | 56:32 |

Notes

- ^{^[a]} signifies an additional producer

== Personnel ==
Credits adapted from the liner notes of Pure Heroine.

- Ella Yelich-O'Connor – vocals, additional production (tracks 5, 6 and 10)
- Joel Little – production, mixing, engineering, instrumentation
- Stuart Hawkes – mastering
- Charles Howells – photography
- Mario Hugo – design, illustration
- Ania Nowak – design support

== Charts ==
=== Weekly charts ===
Weekly chart performance for Pure Heroine
| Chart (2013–2014) | Peak position |
|---|---|
| Australian Albums (ARIA) | 1 |
| Austrian Albums (Ö3 Austria) | 14 |
| Belgian Albums (Ultratop Flanders) | 17 |
| Belgian Albums (Ultratop Wallonia) | 16 |
| Canadian Albums (Billboard) | 2 |
| Croatian International Albums (HDU) | 1 |
| Czech Albums (ČNS IFPI) | 29 |
| Danish Albums (Hitlisten) | 12 |
| Dutch Albums (Album Top 100) | 14 |
| Finnish Albums (Suomen virallinen lista) | 17 |
| French Albums (SNEP) | 20 |
| German Albums (Offizielle Top 100) | 13 |
| Greek Albums (IFPI) | 13 |
| Irish Albums (IRMA) | 4 |
| Italian Albums (FIMI) | 26 |
| Japanese Albums (Oricon) | 34 |
| Mexican Albums (AMPROFON) | 32 |
| New Zealand Albums (RMNZ) | 1 |
| Norwegian Albums (VG-lista) | 2 |
| Portuguese Albums (AFP) | 13 |
| Scottish Albums (Official Charts) | 6 |
| South African Albums (RISA) | 19 |
| South Korean Albums (Gaon) | 94 |
| Spanish Albums (Promusicae) | 58 |
| Swedish Albums (Sverigetopplistan) | 6 |
| Swiss Albums (Schweizer Hitparade) | 8 |
| UK Albums (Official Charts) | 4 |
| US Billboard 200 | 3 |
| US Top Alternative Albums (Billboard) | 1 |
| US Top Rock Albums (Billboard) | 1 |

=== Monthly charts ===
Monthly chart performance for Pure Heroine
| Chart (2014) | Peak position |
|---|---|
| Argentine Monthly Albums (CAPIF) | 1 |
| South Korean Albums (Gaon) | 83 |

=== Year-end charts ===
2013 year-end chart performance for Pure Heroine
| Chart (2013) | Position |
|---|---|
| Australian Albums (ARIA) | 9 |
| Belgian Albums (Ultratop Flanders) | 196 |
| Canadian Albums (Billboard) | 28 |
| French Albums (SNEP) | 149 |
| New Zealand Albums (RMNZ) | 2 |
| New Zealand Artist Albums | 2 |
| Swedish Albums (Sverigetopplistan) | 61 |
| US Billboard 200 | 64 |
| US Rock Albums (Billboard) | 1 |
| US Alternative Albums (Billboard) | 10 |
| Worldwide | 28 |

2014 year-end chart performance for Pure Heroine
| Chart (2014) | Position |
|---|---|
| Australian Albums (ARIA) | 15 |
| Canadian Albums (Billboard) | 6 |
| Dutch Albums (MegaCharts) | 79 |
| French Albums (SNEP) | 82 |
| Germany (Offizielle Top 100) | 91 |
| Mexican Albums (AMPROFON) | 79 |
| New Zealand Albums (RMNZ) | 7 |
| New Zealand Artist Albums | 2 |
| South Korean Albums (Gaon) | 91 |
| Swedish Albums (Sverigetopplistan) | 20 |
| Swiss Albums (Swiss Hitparade) | 56 |
| UK Albums (OCC) | 48 |
| US Billboard 200 | 6 |
| US Alternative Albums (Billboard) | 1 |
| US Rock Albums (Billboard) | 1 |
| Worldwide | 10 |

2015 year-end chart performance for Pure Heroine
| Chart (2015) | Position |
|---|---|
| New Zealand Artist Albums | 12 |
| US Billboard 200 | 130 |
| US Alternative Albums (Billboard) | 34 |
| US Rock Albums (Billboard) | 48 |

2016 year-end chart performance for Pure Heroine
| Chart (2016) | Position |
|---|---|
| New Zealand Artist Albums (RMNZ) | 14 |

2017 year-end chart performance for Pure Heroine
| Chart (2017) | Position |
|---|---|
| US Rock Albums (Billboard) | 97 |

2020 year-end chart performance for Pure Heroine
| Chart (2020) | Position |
|---|---|
| US Alternative Albums (Billboard) | 35 |
| US Rock Albums (Billboard) | 86 |

2021 year-end chart performance for Pure Heroine
| Chart (2021) | Position |
|---|---|
| US Rock Albums (Billboard) | 73 |

2025 year-end chart performance for Pure Heroine
| Chart (2025) | Position |
|---|---|
| Belgian Albums (Ultratop Flanders) | 112 |

=== Decade-end charts ===
2010s-end chart performance for Pure Heroine
| Chart (2010–2019) | Position |
|---|---|
| Australia (ARIA) | 32 |
| Norway (VG-lista) | 33 |
| US Billboard 200 | 40 |
| US Rock Albums (Billboard) | 7 |

=== All-time charts ===
All-time chart performance for Pure Heroine
| Chart | Position |
|---|---|
| US Billboard 200 | 189 |
| US Billboard 200 (Women) | 51 |

== Certifications and sales ==
Certifications and sales for Pure Heroine
| Region | Certification | Certified units/sales |
|---|---|---|
| Australia (ARIA) | 5× Platinum | 350,000^{‡} |
| Austria (IFPI Austria) | Platinum | 15,000^{*} |
| Brazil (Pro-Música Brasil) | Gold | 20,000^{*} |
| Canada (Music Canada) | 6× Platinum | 480,000^{‡} |
| Colombia (ASINCOL) | Gold | |
| Denmark (IFPI Danmark) | 2× Platinum | 40,000^{‡} |
| France (SNEP) | Platinum | 100,000^{‡} |
| Germany (BVMI) | Platinum | 200,000^{‡} |
| Italy (FIMI) | Gold | 25,000^{‡} |
| Mexico (AMPROFON) | Gold | 30,000^{^} |
| New Zealand (RMNZ) | 9× Platinum | 135,000^{‡} |
| Norway (IFPI Norway) | Platinum | 30,000^{‡} |
| Poland (ZPAV) | Gold | 10,000^{*} |
| Singapore (RIAS) | Platinum | 10,000^{*} |
| South Korea (Gaon) | — | 1,198 (Note: South Korea sales figures for Pure Heroine as of 2014) |
| Sweden (GLF) | 2× Platinum | 60,000^{‡} |
| United Kingdom (BPI) | Platinum | 300,000^{^} |
| United States (RIAA) | 6× Platinum | 6,000,000^{‡} |
Summaries
| Worldwide (IFPI) | — | 6,000,000 |
^{*} Sales figures based on certification alone.^{^} Shipments figures based on certification alone.^{‡} Sales+streaming figures based on certification alone.

== Release history ==
Release dates for Pure Heroine
| Region | Date | Format(s) | Edition(s) | Label |
|---|---|---|---|---|
| Australia | 27 September 2013 | CD; digital download | Standard | Universal |
| New Zealand | 27 September 2013 | CD; digital download | Standard | Universal |
| South Korea | 30 September 2013 | Digital download | Standard | Universal |
| United States | 30 September 2013 | CD; digital download | Standard | Lava; Republic |
| Germany | 25 October 2013 | CD; digital download | Standard | Universal |
| Ireland | 25 October 2013 | CD; digital download | Standard | Virgin EMI |
| South Korea | 28 October 2013 | CD | Standard | Universal |
| United Kingdom | 28 October 2013 | CD; digital download | Standard | Virgin EMI |
| Germany | 1 November 2013 | LP | Standard | Universal |
| United Kingdom | 11 November 2013 | LP | Standard | Virgin EMI |
| Australia | 15 November 2013 | LP | Standard | Universal |
| New Zealand | 15 November 2013 | LP | Standard | Universal |
| United States | 19 November 2013 | LP | Standard | Lava; Republic |
| Taiwan | 19 November 2013 | CD; digital download | Standard | Universal |
| Canada | 13 December 2013 | Digital download | Extended | Universal |
| United States | 13 December 2013 | Digital download | Extended | Universal |
| Australia | 16 December 2013 | Digital download | Extended | Universal |
| Belgium | 16 December 2013 | Digital download | Extended | Universal |
| Finland | 16 December 2013 | Digital download | Extended | Universal |
| Germany | 16 December 2013 | Digital download | Extended | Universal |
| Spain | 16 December 2013 | Digital download | Extended | Universal |
| Switzerland | 16 December 2013 | Digital download | Extended | Universal |
| Japan | 19 February 2014 | CD; digital download | Standard | Universal |

== See also ==
- List of 2013 albums
- List of number-one albums of 2013 (Australia)
- List of number-one albums from the 2010s (New Zealand)
