= Team (Lorde song) =

2013 single by Lorde

Single by Lorde

from the album Pure Heroine
- B-side: "White Teeth Teens"
- Released: 13 September 2013
- Studio: Golden Age (Morningside, Auckland, New Zealand)
- Genre: Alternative pop; electro hip-hop
- Length: 3:13
- Label: Universal NZ
- Songwriters: Ella Yelich-O'Connor; Joel Little
- Producer: Joel Little

Lorde singles chronology
"Tennis Court" (2013)	"Team" (2013)	"Glory and Gore" (2014)

Music video
- "Team" on YouTube

"Team" is a song by the New Zealand singer and songwriter Lorde, taken from her debut studio album, Pure Heroine (2013). The song was released on 13 September 2013 as the album's third single in Australia and New Zealand by Universal Music New Zealand, and as the second single from the album in the United States and the United Kingdom by Lava and Republic Records. The track was written by Lorde and Joel Little and produced by Little, with additional production from Lorde herself. Musically, "Team" is a hybrid of alternative pop and electro hip-hop featuring synthesiser, bass and snare drum instrumentation over a handclap-based beat. Lyrically, the track is a tribute to her friends and country.

"Team" was well received by contemporary music critics, who praised its musical style, lyrical content and Lorde's vocal delivery on the track. The single garnered success on charts internationally, peaking at number one in Lebanon, number six on the US Billboard Hot 100, and at number three on the Canadian Hot 100 chart. In Oceania, it peaked at number nineteen in Australia and debuted and peaked at number three in New Zealand. "Team" has been certified seven-times platinum in Australia and Canada, six-times platinum in the United States, and four-times platinum in New Zealand.

A music video for the song was directed by Young Replicant and it was released on 4 December 2013. Filmed in the abandoned Red Hook Grain Terminal in Red Hook, Brooklyn, the video's content was inspired by Lorde's dream of teenagers in their own world. Upon its release, the clip crashed Vevo's channel due to a high number of views. To promote "Team" and Pure Heroine, Lorde performed the song on several occasions, including on the Late Show with David Letterman and at the ARIA Music Awards of 2013.

== Background and composition ==
"Team" was written by Lorde and Joel Little while Lorde was travelling the world. The track was recorded, produced and mixed by Little at his Golden Age Studios in Morningside, Auckland, with Lorde providing additional production. The song was produced using the software Pro Tools. On 13 September 2013 "Team" was leaked, justifying an earlier rush out release. Within hours the audio was uploaded on YouTube and Universal Music New Zealand released the digital download single for sale in Australia and New Zealand. The track was sent to US modern rock radio on 30 September 2013, and to US contemporary hit radio on 19 November 2013 by Lava and Republic Records. "Team" was also sent to US rhythmic contemporary radio on 6 January 2014.

"Team"
A mid-tempo song, "Team" draws from the genres of alternative pop and electro hip-hop.

"Team" is a hybrid of alternative pop and electro hip-hop. Written in the key of G-flat major, "Team" features synthesiser, bass, and snare drum instrumentation over a handclap-based beat. Amanda Dobbins of New York magazine and Maura Johnston of Spin likened the chorus of the song to that of Lana Del Rey's "Born to Die" (2011), while Drowned in Sound's Sammy Maine compared the beats to works produced by Timbaland for Missy Elliott. Lorde's vocal range spans from B♭_{2} to D♭_{5}. The song moves at a tempo of 100 beats per minute.

Lyrically, "Team" is a "tribute to her friends and country". During an interview with Billboard, Lorde described the song as "her take on most modern music" and explained, "no one comes to New Zealand, no one knows anything about New Zealand, and here I am, trying to grow up and become a person." Lorde explained that the line "We live in cities you'll never see on screen" was "to be speaking for the minority" from small cities. She also expresses distaste in common contemporary popular music lyrics telling listeners to "put your hands in the air" through the verse "I'm kind of over getting told to throw my hands up in the air". Writer Lily Rothman for the magazine Time commented that the lyrics "we sure know how to run things" in "Team" were a response to the lyrics "we run things, things don’t run we" in Miley Cyrus' "We Can't Stop" (2013).

== Reception ==
"Team" received critical acclaim from music critics. Brenna Ehrlich from MTV News lauded it as an "insanely catchy jam". The A.V. Club critic Kevin McFarland labelled "Team" as a "club-ready" and "sparkly thumper", while Nathan Jolly from The Music Network simply described it "interesting". John Murphy, in his review of Pure Heroine for musicOMH, commended the lyrics "I'm kinda over getting told to throw my hands up in the air" for being catchy. Marlow Stern writing for The Daily Beast listed "Team" as the fifth best song of 2013. In 2019, Uproxx named the song the thirteenth best song of the 2010s.

On 23 September 2013, "Team" debuted at number three on the New Zealand Singles Chart, becoming Lorde's third consecutive top-three single in the country following number-one singles "Royals" and "Tennis Court". Recorded Music NZ certified the single four-times platinum for sales of 120,000 units in the country. "Team" peaked at number nineteen on the Australian Singles Chart, and was certified seven-times platinum by the Australian Recording Industry Association (ARIA).

Following its impact on US radio stations, "Team" debuted at number thirty-two on the Billboard Rock Airplay, and topped the chart on 7 October 2013. It also topped the Adult Top 40, and charted at number two on the Mainstream Top 40, number two on the Hot Rock Songs and number two on the Alternative Songs. On the Billboard Hot 100, "Team" peaked at number six, becoming her second US top-ten hit (following her debut number-one hit "Royals"). The song reached over two million in sales in the US by April 2014. By December 2014, "Team" had sold 2.45 million copies in the US. The single also reached number three on the Canadian Hot 100, and was certified seven-times platinum by Music Canada, which denotes sales of 560,000 units.

== Music video ==
Lorde's image in "Team" was compared with Katniss Everdeen from The Hunger Games.

The music video for "Team" was directed by Young Replicant. Filmed at the disused Red Hook Grain Terminal in Red Hook, Brooklyn, the video was inspired by Lorde's dream of "teenagers in their own world, a world with hierarchies and initiations, where the boy who was second in command had acne on his face, and so did the girl who was Queen". The director explained that Lorde was one of the "kids who have a unique look", which fit the clip's "sad story" concept.

The video begins with shots of the ocean; The Daily Beast's editor Marlow Stern drew comparisons between the shots to Paul Thomas Anderson's drama film The Master (2012). The scene revealed an unseen city with ruins of factories on an island and full of teens "without any parental guidance". On Lorde's Facebook account, she further explained that world was "so different to anything anyone had ever seen, a dark world full of tropical plants and ruins and sweat". Inside the ruins, she is seen as the "self-anointed" queen of the city's citizens in a "blue, foliage-filled universe". Stern compared her image to that of The Hunger Games' fictional character Katniss Everdeen. A young boy is transported to the island; following his arrival, he must joust on a motorbike to become a part of Lorde's "team". He loses; Lorde commented that "sometimes the person who loses is stronger".

On 4 December 2013, the video was released on Lorde's official Vevo channel on YouTube at 10 am (NZDT). Lily Rothman from Time magazine compared the video for "Team" to Miley Cyrus' "We Can't Stop" music video for their same "mythical settings" – a party ("We Can't Stop") and an island ("Team").

== Live performances and other usage ==
On 12 November 2013, Lorde performed several songs from Pure Heroine during the Late Show with David Letterman to promote the album, including "Team". The track was also performed by Lorde during the ARIA Music Awards of 2013. It also featured during April Kepner's bridal shower on "Man on the Moon", the eleventh episode of the tenth season of Grey's Anatomy which aired in December 2013. At the 2014 MuchMusic Video Awards, Lorde performed a Goth-influenced medley of "Tennis Court" and "Team". American alternative rock band Local H recorded a cover version of "Team" at Electrical Audio in Chicago, Illinois. The Local H version was released as a single on 21 April 2014. J Gramm released a remix of "Team" in December 2013. Noisey gave the remix a positive review, stating that J Gramm "turns the ballad up a notch—with some triumphant drums and overall, a more victorious feel for the stories of the cities she's dreaming up." In November 2020, Chanel featured a cover of the song, performed by French actress Marion Cotillard, in their Chanel No. 5 perfume advertisement.

The track was included in the set lists for the Pure Heroine (2013-14), Melodrama (2017-18), Solar Power (2022-23), and Ultrasound (2025-26) concert tours. During the performance of the song on the Ultrasound Tour, Lorde lit up the stage in the colours of the flag of Palestine, in support of the Palestinian cause.

== Charts ==
=== Weekly charts ===
Weekly chart performance for "Team"
Chart (2013–2014)	Peak position
Australia (ARIA)	19
Austria (Ö3 Austria Top 40)	10
Belgium (Ultratip Bubbling Under Flanders)	6
Belgium (Ultratop 50 Wallonia)	24
Canada Hot 100 (Billboard)	3
Canada AC (Billboard)	6
Canada CHR/Top 40 (Billboard)	2
Canada Hot AC (Billboard)	2
Canada Rock (Billboard)	15
Czech Republic Airplay (ČNS IFPI)	11
Czech Republic Singles Digital (ČNS IFPI)	25
Denmark (Tracklisten)	20
France (SNEP)	24
Germany (GfK)	20
Hungary (Single Top 40)	12
Iceland (RÚV)	13
Ireland (IRMA)	32
Israel International Airplay (Media Forest)	10
Italy (FIMI)	19
Lebanon (The Official Lebanese Top 20)	1
Mexico Anglo (Monitor Latino)	10
Netherlands (Dutch Top 40)	25
Netherlands (Single Top 100)	36
New Zealand (Recorded Music NZ)	3
Romania (Airplay 100)	71
Scottish Singles Sales (Official Charts)	25
Slovakia (Rádio Top 100 Oficiálna)	25
Slovakia Singles Digital (ČNS IFPI)	29
Slovenia (SloTop50)	37
Spain (Promusicae)	45
Sweden (Sverigetopplistan)	39
Switzerland (Schweizer Hitparade)	14
UK Singles (Official Charts)	29
US Billboard Hot 100	6
US Hot Rock & Alternative Songs (Billboard)	2
US Adult Contemporary (Billboard)	13
US Adult Pop Airplay (Billboard)	1
US Dance Airplay (Billboard)	14
US Latin Airplay (Billboard)	44
US Pop Airplay (Billboard)	2
US Rhythmic Airplay (Billboard)	7
Venezuela Pop/Rock General (Record Report)	3

=== Year-end charts ===
2013 year-end chart performance for "Team"
Chart (2013)	Position
New Zealand (Recorded Music NZ)	48
US Hot Rock Songs (Billboard)	33

2014 year-end chart performance for "Team"
Chart (2014)	Position
Austria (Ö3 Austria Top 40)	65
Belgium (Ultratop 50 Wallonia)	94
Canada (Canadian Hot 100)	12
France (SNEP)	73
Germany (Official German Charts)	79
Italy (FIMI)	50
US Billboard Hot 100	18
US Adult Contemporary (Billboard)	38
US Adult Top 40 (Billboard)	13
US Hot Rock Songs (Billboard)	2
US Mainstream Top 40 (Billboard)	7
US Rhythmic (Billboard)	26

=== Decade-end charts ===
Decade-end chart performance for "Team"
Chart (2010–2019)	Position
US Hot Rock Songs (Billboard)	31

=== All-time charts ===
Chart (1995–2021)	Position
US Adult Alternative Songs (Billboard)	88

== Certifications ==
Certifications for "Team"
Region	Certification	Certified units/sales
Australia (ARIA)	7× Platinum	490,000^{‡}
Austria (IFPI Austria)	Platinum	30,000^{*}
Brazil (Pro-Música Brasil)	3× Platinum	180,000^{‡}
Canada (Music Canada)	7× Platinum	560,000^{‡}
France (SNEP)	Platinum	200,000^{‡}
Germany (BVMI)	Gold	150,000^{‡}
Italy (FIMI)	Platinum	30,000^{‡}
New Zealand (RMNZ)	4× Platinum	120,000^{‡}
Norway (IFPI Norway)	2× Platinum	20,000^{‡}
Spain (Promusicae)	Gold	30,000^{‡}
Sweden (GLF)	Platinum	40,000^{‡}
United Kingdom (BPI)	Platinum	600,000^{‡}
United States (RIAA)	6× Platinum	6,000,000^{‡}
Streaming
Denmark (IFPI Danmark)	Platinum	2,600,000^{†}
^{*} Sales figures based on certification alone.^{‡} Sales+streaming figures based on certification alone.^{†} Streaming-only figures based on certification alone.

== Release history ==
Release dates and formats for "Team"
Country	Date	Format	Record label
Australia	13 September 2013	Digital download	Universal NZ
New Zealand	13 September 2013	Digital download	Universal NZ
United States	30 September 2013	Modern rock	Lava; Republic
United States	19 November 2013	Contemporary hit radio	Lava; Republic
United States	6 January 2014	Rhythmic contemporary	Lava; Republic
Italy	24 January 2014	Contemporary hit radio	Universal
United Kingdom	12 April 2014	7-inch vinyl	Universal

== Covers ==
On 17 October 2025, Palestinian-Canadian singer Nemahsis released an official cover of "Team", along with a music video in memory of Palestinian journalists Saleh al-Jafarawi and Anas Al-Sharif. The cover is a "stripped-down rendition", with a slower tempo and featuring the piano. The official cover came two years after Nemhasis shared a video of herself singing "Team" on social media, paired with images of the Gaza strip before and after Israeli bombardments in 2023. The video was reposted by Lorde with the caption "She speaks through me; I speak through her."

== See also ==
- List of Adult Top 40 number-one songs of the 2010s
