= Landcruisin' =

Single by A. K. Paul
- Released: 24 March 2016
- Genre: R&B
- Length: 3:42
- Label: Self-released
- Songwriter: Paul
- Producer: Paul

A. K. Paul singles chronology
"So Good" (2014)	"Landcruisin'" (2016)	"Be Honest" (2020)

"Landcruisin'" is a song by English musician Anup Paul, professionally known as A.K. Paul. It was released as his debut solo single on 24 March 2016. Written and produced by Paul, it is an R&B track backed by synths, guitars and percussion, whose sonority was likened to that of various artists. The song is the first release of Paul Institute, a platform founded by A.K. Paul and his brother Jai Paul.

"Landcruisin'" premiered on Zane Lowe's Beats 1 radio show before receiving digital, streaming, and 7-inch vinyl releases. Most music critics gave the song favorable reviews, comparing it to the works of Prince, D'Angelo, and Miguel, saying it matched expectations. However, a minority of reviewers dismissed it as inferior to the works of Jai Paul. It managed to enter the Billboard Twitter Emerging Artists chart.

== Background ==
A.K. Paul's first single as a main performer was a 2014 collaboration with English singer Nao on the title track of her extended play (EP) So Good. Until then, he had written and produced songs for other artists, including "Next to Me" by Emeli Sandé and "Flesh" by Miguel. He was also involved in the recording of his brother Jai Paul's two singles "BTSTU (Demo)" and "Jasmine". Journalists have characterised A.K. Paul as "elusive" and observed that until the release of "Landcruisin'", he has preferred "hanging out in the shadows". "Landcruisin'" was recorded at the Spicy Benefit Studio and The Doogh in London. A.K. Paul produced, engineered, mixed, and mastered the song, which features his songwriting, instrumentation, and programming. He is also responsible for the song's sound design and effects.

== Composition ==
"Landcruisin'"
Horns and the sound of a motorbike engine serve as the intro to "Landcruisin'", making way for a mesh of synths, guitars and percussion.

"Landcruisin'" was categorized by critics as an R&B song. The song opens with the sound of horns and a motorbike engine, described by Connick as "the perfect opening salvo", progressing into an ever-changing "sexy and slightly abrasive groove". Instrumentation is provided by synthesisers reminiscent of science fiction and Hong Kong action cinema, glam rock-influenced guitars, and "curiously evolving shuffle-percussion", which includes what Aurora Mitchell of Spin described as a: "clacking pinball lever drum". Mitchell felt that "Landcruisin'" sounded like: "the soundtrack to the opening scene of an action film". Tom Connick, writing for DIY, elaborated:

(...) it’s top speed, glitching electronics that drag everything along. Backed by skyscraping swells of bass, it comes off like Hans Zimmer chucking his Inception soundtrack through a blender, A.K. lending his yearning vocal to give a human edge to all the razor-edged sound.

top-speedbass swellsCritics have suggested affinities between "Landcruisin'" and the works of other artists. Marc Hogan of Pitchfork considered D'Angelo's third studio album Black Messiah (2014) as an inspiration for the song; Chris Kelly wrote in Fact that it reminds him of "Miguel circa Art Dealer Chic". Additionally, Prince was frequently cited by journalists reviewing the track, as exemplified by ShortList contributor David Cornish analysing "Landcruisin'" as "a blockbuster soundscape" characterised by "overdrive riffs" and "lyrical tones" resemblant of the aforementioned artist.

== Release and reception ==
On 21 March 2016, Pitchfork Media reported that Jai and A.K. Paul had created the Paul Institute. Although the nature of this project was not disclosed at the time, a press release revealed that it is a collaboration between the brothers, and artist Muz Azar, with the intent of also potentially introducing other artists. Devoid of information, its website prompted visitors to provide their country and telephone number in order to receive a passcode which granted access to updates. DIY writer Tom Connick commented on the attention the project captured saying: "With little effort and even less output, Jai and A.K. Paul quickly built up the kind of mystique thousands of bedroom producers and their pricey publicists would kill for. Zane Lowe premiered "Landcruisin'" three days later on his Beats 1 radio programme, where it was played three consecutive times; he described it as "Blade Runner pop". The song was made available that day for Paul Institute members through digital download and streaming, while public SoundCloud and iTunes releases were enabled on 25 March. A limited-edition, autographed 7" vinyl record, exclusive to registered users of the Paul Institute, was also released.

"Landcruisin'" garnered mostly positive reviews from music critics. Pitchfork Media's Marc Hogan opined that the song "both lives up to the expectations and sidesteps them", writing: "With a sound like this, why stay on land?" Similarly, Collin Brennan, of Consequence of Sound, said it was "totally worth all the buzz", and Stereogum writer James Rettig dubbed the track: "more than good enough on its own, an enticing and theatrical piece of futuristic pop music". Fact published a review of "Landcruisin'", to which five journalists contributed with commentary, and their score out of 10 points. Daniel Montesinos-Donaghy and Tayyab Amin awarded it a rating of 9 – the latter deemed it "wonderfully complete", whereas Montesinos-Donaghy stated: "[it] has a Technicolour ambition held within its blog-cycle frame, and Paul sounds as eager as possible to outgrow his frame as soon as possible." Aurora Mitchell of the same publication explained her score of 8 by saying she was "definitely here for it". With respective ratings of 5 and 6, Chris Kelly and Son Raw were more critical of the song – both negatively compared A.K. Paul's artistry to that of Jai, as Kelly called the single "fun but forgettable" and Raw quipped: "this is not the Paul you are looking for, move along." It entered the Billboard Twitter Emerging Artists chart on the week ending 9 April 2016, at number 12.

== Release history ==
Country	Date	Format	Label
United States	25 March 2016	Music download	Paul Institute
