= Fabiana Palladino (album) =

Studio album by Fabiana Palladino
- Released: 5 April 2024
- Genre: Pop; R&B
- Length: 37:27
- Language: English
- Label: Paul Institute; XL

Singles from Fabiana Palladino
- 1. "I Care" Released: 7 November 2023; 2. "Stay with Me Through the Night" Released: 24 January 2024; 3. "I Can't Dream Anymore" Released: 12 March 2024

It was important to have them on there because they're such a big part of my life getting here. I wanted [this album] to really feel like it was me and about me. I do love those first records where it is just so direct, and it is a clear statement of an artist.

—Fabiana Palladino on recording with her musical family.

Fabiana Palladino is the debut album by British pop musician Fabiana Palladino. The release was recorded over the course of multiple years and was released on April 5, 2024, through the Paul Institute imprint of XL Recordings. The album received critical acclaim, with reviewers praising its songwriting and retro-futuristic stylistic choices.

== Background ==
While studying music at Goldsmiths University, Palladino began uploading music to MySpace. Through this platform, she met artists including Jessie Ware, SBTRKT, and Sampha, with whom she played in sessions and sought feedback. After uploading her music to SoundCloud, Palladino was contacted by Jai Paul, and released the singles "Mystery" in 2017 and "Shimmer" in 2018 on Paul Institute, the label he founded with his brother A.K. Paul. Following a breakup with a long-term partner, Palladino moved back to her family home in London in 2020, shortly before the COVID-19 pandemic. During this time, while quarantining with her siblings, she began writing the songs that would form the album, drawing on her feelings of loneliness and isolation and new single status as themes.

== Critical reception ==
According to the review aggregator Metacritic, Fabiana Palladino received "universal acclaim" based on a weighted average score of 88 out of 100 from five critic scores. Editors at AllMusic rated this album 4.5 out of 5 stars, with critic Andy Kellman writing that this album "is one creatively askew pop-R&B delight after another, all voiced with captivating and confident flair by a razor-sharp songwriter", whom he compares to Prince. Harry Thorfinn-George at The Arts Desk gave Fabiana Palladino 4 out of 5 stars, characterizing the work as "a strong debut album which serves as a formal introduction to an artist who has been on the side-lines for too long". Editors at The Fader chose this among the best releases of the week, where Sandra Song called it "vulnerable, honest, and intimate... [with a] kind of raw human touch you'd expect from a D.I.Y. bedroom musician" in spite of "the sleek, hyper-produced grandeur of her '80s pop-R&B production".

In The Guardian, Alexis Petridis chose this as his album of the week, giving it 5 out of 5 stars and stated that "for all the knowing signifiers from the age of power-dressing and rolled-up suit sleeves... the album never feels like a retro exercise" and he considered it "devoid of weak tracks or ideas that don't gel, it's an album that sounds as if it was made by someone who knows exactly what she's doing" That newspaper published a second review by Shaad D'Souza who compared this music to Janet Jackson and called it "a sharp debut that knows the power of patience and tension". Sam Franzini at The Line of Best Fit rated Fabiana Palladino an 8 out of 10, characterizing it as "a near-effortless reinvention of retro pop, soul, funk, and R&B tracks with a glossy modern sheen, setting the stage for more grandiose statements in the future".

At musicOMH, Ben Devlin rated this work 4 out of 5 stars, stating that it was "surely... worth the wait" after Palladino released an intermittent series of singles for several years leading up to this album, which Devlin writes "takes inspiration from a grab bag of stars and styles, from R&B to disco, the results are sometimes charmingly retro and other times fresh and inventive". Tony Stamp of Radio New Zealand ended his review of this release, "the main thing that’s drawn me back though is the resolve in her voice, and the way she crafts melodies that evoke the past, but manage to feel current". This was Album of the Week at Stereogum, where critic Caleb Catlin cautioned listeners that "because of the production's intricately designed architecture, a listener might mistake this for a scholarly form of pop, as music that only the sophisticated avid listener can engage with" but continued that "she communicates directly, and the album is a lot punchier for it". Grant Sharples at Uproxx included Fabiana Palladino as one of the best indie music albums of the week, writing that Palladino has "carved out her own style at the nexus of indie-pop and ’80s soul, adjusting her elastic voice to suit her own vision rather than someone else’s".

On 4 June, Stereogum did a roundup of the best albums of the year so far and ranked this 19, with Tom Breihan stating that "Palladino’s voice glides over tricky beats and slippery keyboards". A similar listing on 20 June by Radio New Zealand included this in the five best albums of 2024, where Charlotte stated that Palladino's "moody and passionate self-titled solo album is worth the wait" and is "bright, strong and has such a groove".

=== Year-end lists ===
Select year-end rankings for Fabiana Palladino
Publication/critic	Accolade	Rank	Ref.
Rough Trade UK	Albums of the Year 2024	20	
NPR Music	The 50 Best Albums of 2024	NR	
Paste Magazine	The 100 Best Albums of 2024	33	
The Guardian	The 50 Best Albums of 2024	17	
The Fader	The 50 Best Albums of 2024	24	

== Track listing ==
All tracks are written by Fabiana Palladino, except where noted.

Fabiana Palladino track listing
No.	Title	Writer(s)	Producer(s)	Length
1.	"Closer"		Fabiana Palladino; Harry Craze; Jai Paul	3:35
2.	"Can You Look in the Mirror?"		Palladino; Paul	3:19
3.	"I Can't Dream Anymore"		Palladino; Craze; Paul	3:12
4.	"Give Me a Sign"		Palladino; Craze; Paul	3:18
5.	"I Care (feat. Jai Paul)"	Palladino; Paul	Palladino; Paul	4:18
6.	"Stay with Me Through the Night"		Palladino; Paul; Pino Palladino	3:36
7.	"Shoulda"		Palladino	4:29
8.	"Deeper"		Palladino; Craze	3:44
9.	"In the Fire"		Ben Baptie; Palladino; Paul	3:57
10.	"Forever"		Palladino; Pino Palladino	3:59
Total length:				37:31

== Personnel ==
Musicians

- Fabiana Palladino – vocals (all tracks), hand claps (1, 7), keyboards (1–3, 6, 9), shaker (1), synthesizers (1–5, 7–9), piano (2, 5, 6, 10), bass (3, 4), drums (4), cowbell (7), drum programming (7, 8), percussion (8)
- Pino Palladino – bass (1, 2, 5–7, 10), guitar (6, 10)
- Jai Paul – drum programming (1–3, 5, 9), synthesizer programming (2), guitar (3–5, 9), synthesizers (3, 5, 6, 9); vocals, percussion (5); drum machine, cowbell, handclaps (6); synth bass (9), drums (10)
- Jamie Woon – backing vocals (1, 9)
- A. Hira – backing vocals (2)
- Giancarla Palladino – backing vocals (2, 6)
- Maz Palladino – spoken word (3)
- Steve Ferrone – drums (6)
- Joe Newman – guitar (7)
- Rocco Palladino – drums (7)
- Rob Moose – string arrangement, viola, violin (10)

Technical

- Fabiana Palladino – production (all tracks), engineering (2, 3, 6, 7, 9, 10)
- Ben Baptie – mixing (1–4, 7–10); additional production, vocal engineering (9)
- Harry Craze – engineering, production (1, 3, 4, 8)
- Joseph Hartwell-Jones – vocal engineering (1, 2, 4, 6–8, 10), vocal production (1, 2, 4–8, 10), engineering (5)
- Jai Paul – additional production (1, 9), production (2–6)
- Fabian Prynn – engineering (4, 10)
- Duncan Fuller – vocal engineering (5)
- Russell Elevado – mixing (5)
- Drew Dungate-Smith – engineering (6, 10)
- Pino Palladino – production (6, 10)
- Eric Thorngren – engineering (6)
- Shawn Everett – mixing (6)
- Sophie Ellis – vocal engineering (9)
- Rob Moose – engineering (10)
- Matt Colton – mastering

== See also ==
- 2024 in British music
- List of 2024 albums
