= Salvia Palth =

New Zealand indie rock musician

- Born: Daniel Johann Lines; 1996 (age 29–30); Collingwood, New Zealand
- Genres: Indie rock; slowcore; lo-fi; dream pop; shoegaze; noise rock; slacker rock; post-rock; ambient
- Years active: 2013–present

Daniel Johann Lines (born 1996), known professionally as salvia palth (stylised in lowercase), is a New Zealand indie rock musician. He is best known for his 2013 album Melanchole, which he created at the age of 15. The album gained little traction upon its release, but later became viral online. This prompted Johann to release his second album, Last Chance to See, in June 2024. He has an unreleased album on platforms like SoundCloud and YouTube called Voices. Despite this success, Johann does not play live shows and prefers to not use expensive equipment or studios.

The name salvia palth came from a play on words from the famous poet, Sylvia Plath , and the stimulant, salvia. He has also released music under the names Adore, 1996 and Daniel Johann.

The person featured on the album cover of Melanchole is Briann Bermingham, Daniel's friend and member of the band Lacebark.

== Life and career ==
Daniel Johann Lines was born and raised in 1996 near Collingwood, New Zealand. He grew up in poverty and suffered frequent epileptic seizures, making him unable to play sports or secure a job. This led to the creation of Melanchole, as Lines was "the most depressed [he had] ever been." This emotion is also reflected in many of his unreleased songs from 2012-2015, most of which are under his own name.

Johann Lines originally considered Melanchole as practice, hoping to make an album he was more satisfied with in the future. The album he sought to create was supposed to be the first under a new moniker: Adore, 1996. The masters of the album were destroyed in a house fire; however, WAV files of the unfinished tracks survived, which he would later release under his own name, as Winter.

After Winter, Johann Lines started to make more electronic and experimental music which he would release under Adore, 1996, none of which would receive significant attention. At this time, Johann Lines was struggling financially. He was working part-time for a political polling company in Pōneke when he decided to check the revenue made from Melanchole, and discovered it had accumulated over $10,000 USD. He quit his job and the album only became bigger, eventually leading to him being able to live off of it.

Melanchole, Winter, and The Earth Portrayed as God's Empty House, were influenced by Phil Elverum, Elliott Smith, YYU, Mark Kozelek, and other artists. In 2013, Johann Lines opened for Phil Elverum in early 2013, playing songs he made with Dali Gale and Ike Zwanikken.

Johann Lines moved to Wellington and studied music production at university. He focused on writing and recording Last Chance to See, an album intended to, while still appealing to his younger audience, reflect his growth both emotionally and musically. The album has a more upbeat and experimental sound, which incorporates pop, bossa nova, and dub. Last Chance to See was influenced by Jai Paul, Roger Troutman, and Beck.

== Discography ==
=== Released ===
As Salvia Palth

- Melanchole (2013)
- Last Chance to See (2024)

As Daniel Johann

- The Earth Portrayed as God's Empty House (2013)
- Went Home About It / City Smells (2014)
- Winter (2016)
- D N S 5 X (2017)

As Adore, 1996

- U Left / Wake (2015)
- World Anti-God Freedom X (2016)
