= Hammer (Lorde song) =

2025 single by Lorde

Single by Lorde

from the album Virgin
- Written: Late 2023
- Released: 20 June 2025
- Genre: Pop; R&B
- Length: 3:13
- Label: Universal New Zealand; Republic
- Songwriters: Ella Yelich-O'Connor; James Harmon Stack
- Producers: Lorde; Jim-E Stack; Buddy Ross

Lorde singles chronology
"Man of the Year" (2025)	"Hammer" (2025)	"Mind Loaded" (2025)

Music video
- "Hammer" on YouTube

"Hammer" is a song by New Zealand singer and songwriter Lorde. It was released on 27 June 2025 through Universal Music New Zealand and Republic Records as the third single from her fourth studio album, Virgin (2025). Lorde wrote and produced the song with American songwriter Jim-E Stack, with additional production from American record producer Buddy Ross. "Hammer" is a pop and R&B song instrumented by kick drums and clipped vocals. Lorde described the song as "an ode to city life and horniness" and wrote the song in late 2023 after discontinuing use of oral contraceptives. The lyrics recount the singer's exploration of her gender identity and acceptance of her general uncertainty towards life.

"Hammer" received praise from music critics, who commended the song's instrumentation and lyrical imagery. The song entered the singles chart in New Zealand at 29 and had minor chart placements in Australia, Ireland, and the United Kingdom. An accompanying music video was directed by Renell Medrano and shot in London's Hampstead Heath, where Lorde spent much of her time while writing Virgin. The video features her dancing and swimming in nature, smoking cannabis near a lake, and swinging naked in a hammock. Lorde performed "Hammer" as the opener of the Ultrasound World Tour (2025–26).

== Background and development ==
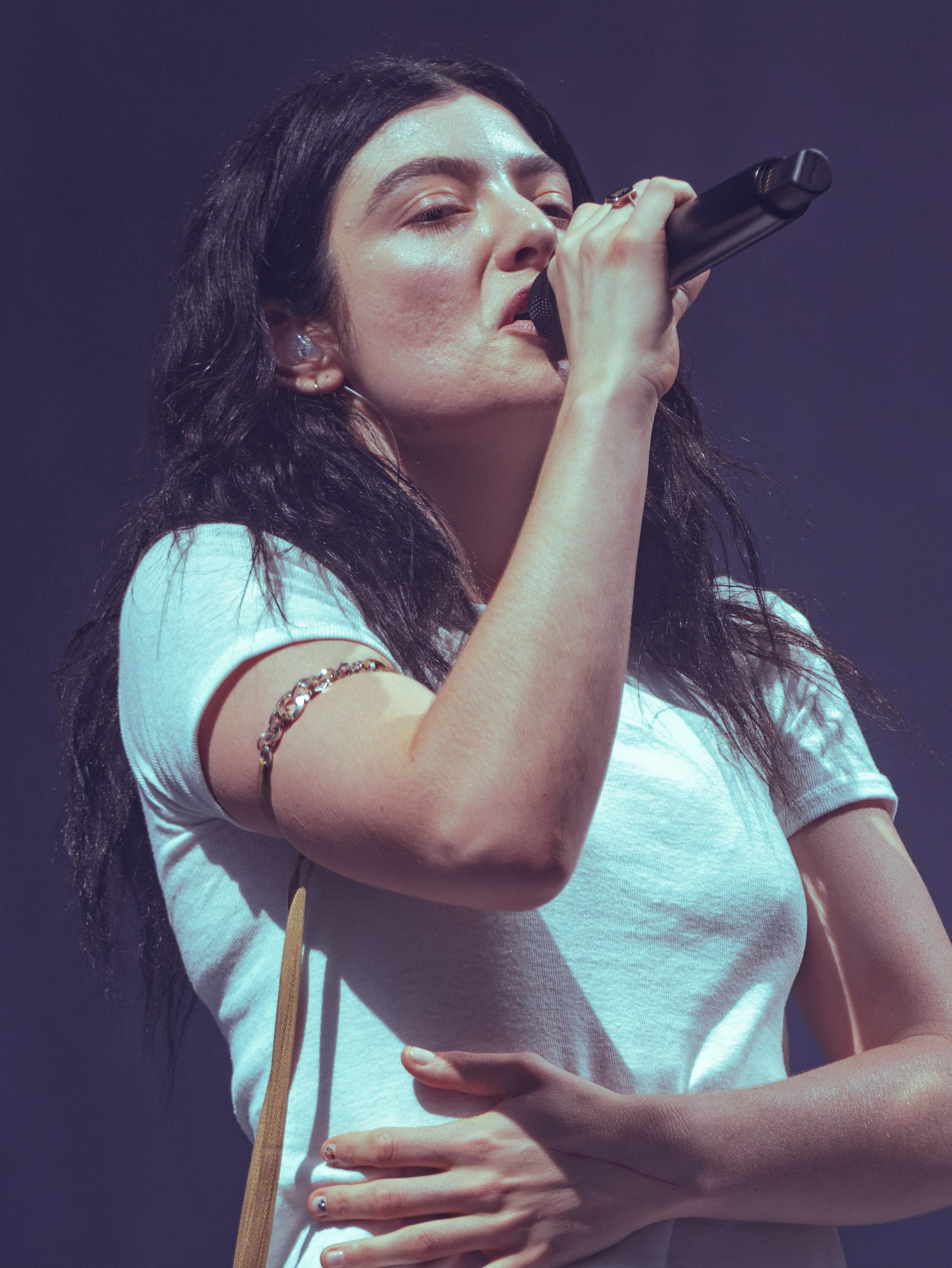
Lorde performing "Hammer" at the Glastonbury Festival 2025

New Zealand singer-songwriter Lorde announced her fourth studio album, Virgin (2025), on 30 April 2025 via social media and her website. In the announcement, she described Virgin as an attempt to document her femininity: "raw, primal, innocent, elegant, openhearted, spiritual, masc." In a cover page interview with Rolling Stone, she had previously stated that Virgin was partially inspired by her broadening gender identity, which she came to better understand after recovering from an eating disorder and discontinuing use of oral contraceptives. The second single from the album, "Man of the Year", was released on 29 May and reflected on the expansiveness of her gender identity, a theme that Lorde expanded on in "Hammer". In the Rolling Stone interview, Lorde also stated that she had isolated herself in London during the summer of 2023 after an intense breakup, providing revelations that she describes in "Hammer". In an interview with Zane Lowe for Apple Music, Lorde shared that she wrote a first draft of the song in late 2023 after stopping birth control, adding that she was inspired by walking around New York City. She did not expect the song to be included on Virgin until spring of 2024, when Jim-E Stack involved Buddy Ross in the production for the song; she attributed her decision to include "Hammer" on the album to Ross's heavily electronic yet "earthy" production.

On 18 June, she announced on social media that "Hammer" would be the third and final single before the release of the album, adding that it would serve as the opening track. On her website, the singer described the song as "Magic jewelry. Nine moons. Larry the pigeon man. Flirting with the guy at MNZ. Ovulation. Crisp spring sun. Immense gratitude to be alive. Braiding with language. Buddy's granular synth. Logic open on the plane. Big breakthrough in London. First song sent to mix. Always track 1. The sound of my rebirth." The cover art for the single was shot by Talia Chetrit and comprises a photo of Lorde's reflection in an infinity mirror as she washes her face in a sink. Lorde had previously previewed the song to fans in a pop-up event in a London carpark building along with other tracks from Virgin. Ahead of its release, she shared a teaser for the music video, featuring herself with braided pigtails and a pigeon perched on each shoulder, along with a snippet of one of the lyrics: "There's a heat in the pavement / My mercury's raising".

Lorde first performed "Hammer" at the Glastonbury Festival as part of an unannounced set on 27 June, the same day Virgin was released. She went on to perform it as the opening number of her ongoing Ultrasound World Tour (2025–26).

== Composition and lyrics ==
Lorde wrote and produced "Hammer" with American record producer Jim-E Stack, with Buddy Ross providing additional production. She described the song as "an ode to city life and horniness." It is a pop and R&B song that begins with Lorde singing over a "chattering drone." The song's instrumentation includes kick drums and clipped vocals. Lorde confirmed that the song's instrumentals aim to resemble a human voice struggling to take a breath. Stereogum's Tom Breihan characterized the track as "not quite a dance song, but one that keeps threatening to turn into a dance song at any moment", highlighting its dynamic quality. Helen Brown of The Independent described Lorde's vocals as rap-singing and deemed the mood of the track as "one of heel-sprung trainers on asphalt [...] alone in a city." Jake Viswanath of Bustle deemed the climax of the song "a full breakdown."

The lyrics of the song reflect on how city life inspired Lorde's ongoing exploration of gender identity and a newfound sense of freedom. (Note: Attributed to Stereogum's Tom Breihan, Nylon's Jillian Giandurco, Elle's Juliana Ukiomogbae, Bustle's Jake Viswanath, and The Fader's Steffanee Wang) The Fader additionally interpreted the song as an "age-anthem", describing it as "the sonic equivalent of getting through your 20s, realizing actually you know nothing about the world and yourself," while Breihan contended that the lyrics describe a desire for emotional connection. The first verse and pre-chorus describe the singer's newfound lust for life and the resulting shifts in her gender expression: "I burn and I sing and I scheme and I dance / Some days I'm a woman, some days I'm a man." In the chorus, the singer accepts her ambivalence towards life: "I’m ready to feel like I don’t have the answers." Rolling Stone, Pitchfork, and The Independent described the song as a repudiation of the carefree attitude of her previous studio album, Solar Power (2021). The lyrics establish the setting of the song in New York City; in the second verse, Lorde recounts having her ear pierced and aura read on Canal Street. The end of the song, "It's a fucked up world, been to hell and back / But I've sent you a postcard from the edge", acknowledge that the narrator's now-positive outlook on life is a result of her tumultuous past.

== Reception ==
=== Critical response ===
Several music critics commended "Hammer" for its emotive production. Steffanee Wang of The Fader named "Hammer" the best single "hands down" from the album, calling the song "a furiously bubbling rush of drums" with "a truly addictive vocal oscillation." Wang highlighted the songwriting as evidence of the evolution of Lorde's songwriting, describing the lyrical imagery as filled with "flashes of unrestrained euphoria" comparable to those found on Melodrama (2017), Lorde's second studio album. Writing for Stereogum, Tom Breihan praised "Hammer" as a "swirling, exuberant jam." Walden Green of Pitchfork described the track as "punchier and more pop" than the previous singles, praising Jim-E Stack's production for its momentum and noting that Lorde delivers the lyrics with urgency and presence. Nylon's Jillian Giandurco wrote that the track "wastes no time delivering on that promise" of being "an ode to city life and horniness." Bustle's Jake Viswanath opined that Lorde "describes her desires in the most poetic way possible." In The Skinny's review of Virgin, Rhys Morgan noted that the "glitching synths and stuttering percussion" of the track infuse a vitality "marrying early 2010s nostalgia with refreshed inventiveness". In a negative review of the track, The Arts Desk's James Mellen described it and "Man of the Year" as "jittery, hookless melodies."

=== Commercial performance ===
Upon release, "Hammer" debuted and peaked at number 29 on the singles chart in New Zealand, Lorde's home country. The song had minor chart placements in other Anglophone countries, including in the United Kingdom (66), Ireland (68), and Australia (98), and entered the Billboard Bubbling Under Hot 100 chart in the United States at number 20.

== Music video ==
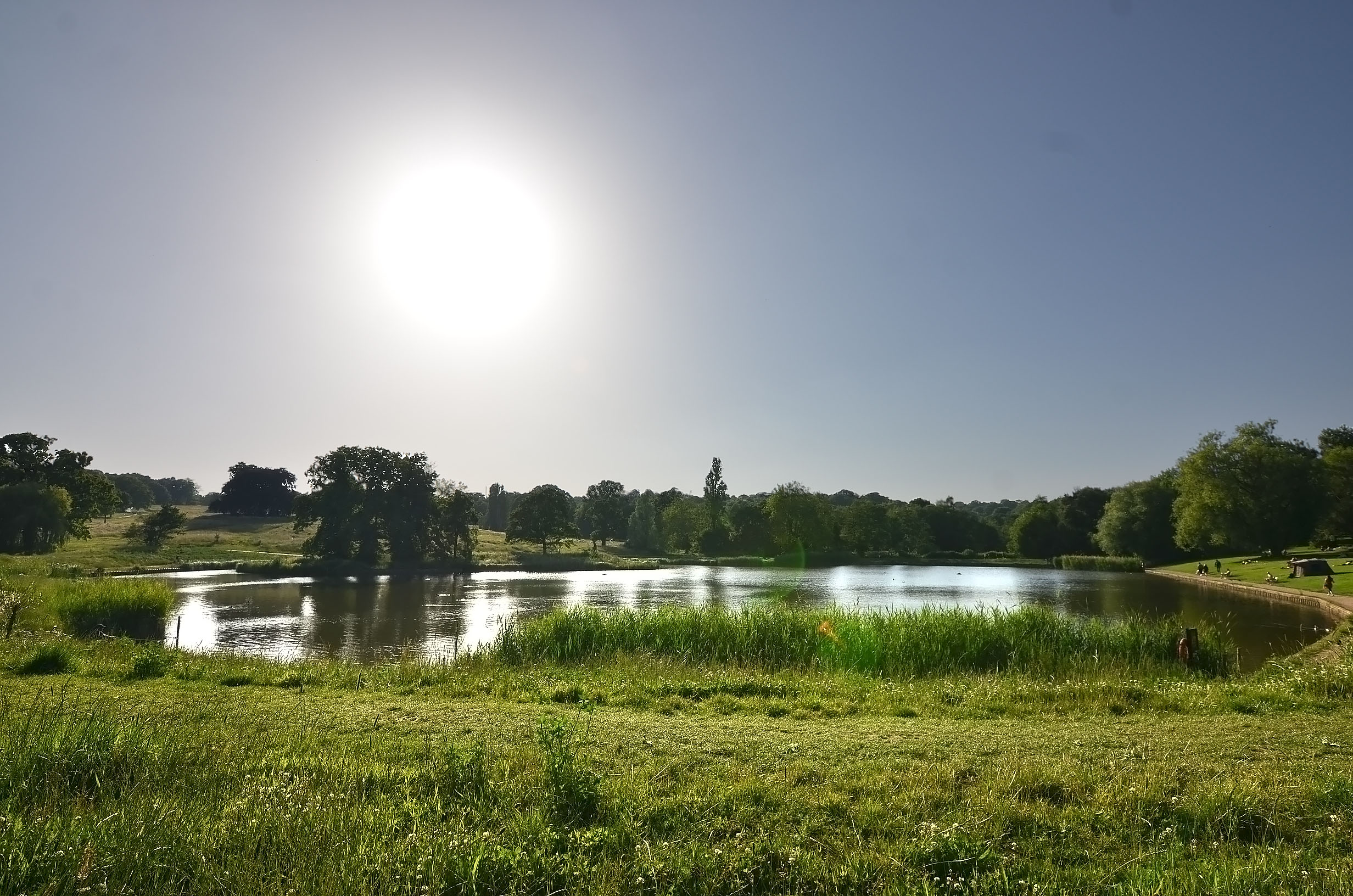
The music video for "Hammer" was filmed at Hampstead Heath (pictured), a public space in London.

The music video for "Hammer" was released alongside the single, directed by Renell Medrano. The video begins with a shot of the back of Lorde's head with a pigeon on each of her shoulders. It then alternates between clips of the singer dancing in nature, swimming, smoking cannabis by a lake, and swinging naked in a hammock. One clip features Lorde receiving a tattoo on her buttocks. The video was filmed at Hampstead Heath in London, a public park where she spent much of her time while making Virgin. Bustle remarked that the music video "captures Lorde's life-changing yet horny summer perfectly," and Stereogum named it the "horniest" video of the singer's career.

== Credits and personnel ==
Credits were adapted from the liner notes of Virgin.

- Lorde – composition, production, vocals
- Jim-E Stack – composition, production, drum programming, engineering, keyboards, synthesizer
- Koby Berman – additional engineering
- Chris Gehringer – mastering
- Ian Gold – engineering
- Jack Manning – additional engineering
- Will Quinnell – mastering
- Buddy Ross – additional production, keyboards, piano, synthesizer
- Mark "Spike" Stent – mixing

== Charts ==
Chart performance for "Hammer"
Chart (2025)	Peak position
Australia (ARIA)	98
Costa Rica Anglo Airplay (Monitor Latino)	11
Guatemala Anglo Airplay (Monitor Latino)	12
Ireland (IRMA)	68
New Zealand (Recorded Music NZ)	29
UK Singles (Official Charts)	66
US Bubbling Under Hot 100 (Billboard)	20
