= Man of the Year (Lorde song) =

2025 single by Lorde

Single by Lorde

from the album Virgin
- Written: November 2023
- Released: 29 May 2025
- Genre: Downtempo; industrial; pop
- Length: 3:00
- Label: Universal New Zealand; Republic
- Songwriters: Ella Yelich-O'Connor; James Harmon Stack
- Producers: Lorde; Jim-E Stack

Lorde singles chronology
"What Was That" (2025)	"Man of the Year" (2025)	"Hammer" (2025)

Music video
- "Man of the Year" on YouTube

"Man of the Year" is a song by New Zealand singer-songwriter Lorde. It was released on 29 May 2025 through Universal Music New Zealand and Republic Records as the second single from her fourth studio album, Virgin (2025). Lorde co-wrote and co-produced the song with American songwriter Jim-E Stack, and wrote it while exploring her gender expression after attending a GQ 'Men of the Year' party in November 2023. The song is a downtempo and industrial track that begins as a pop ballad with a minimalist production and builds into a powerful climax, incorporating cymbals, drums, and synths. Lyrically, it recounts Lorde's experience exploring her masculinity and gender identity, describing herself as the titular "man of the year."

"Man of the Year" received praise from music critics, who described the song's emotional vulnerability as a culmination of her artistic evolution, although some reviews were critical of the song's instrumentation. The song debuted and peaked at number 11 on the singles chart in New Zealand and had minor chart placements in Australia, Canada, Ireland, the United Kingdom, and on the Billboard Global 200. An accompanying music video for the song was released on the same day and directed by Grant Singer, featuring Lorde binding her chest and dancing in soil in an empty loft. The setting of the music video was a reference to The New York Earth Room art installation by artist Walter De Maria. Critics opined that the music video symbolised themes of self-expression and gender fluidity.

== Background and development ==
New Zealand singer-songwriter Lorde announced her fourth studio album, Virgin (2025), on 30 April 2025 via social media and her website. In the announcement, she described Virgin as an attempt to document her femininity: "raw, primal, innocent, elegant, openhearted, spiritual, masc." In a cover page interview with Rolling Stone, she stated that the album was partially inspired by her broadening gender identity, which she came to better understand after recovering from an eating disorder, discontinuing use of oral contraceptives, and being diagnosed with premenstrual dysphoric disorder. She also recalled a conversation with singer Chappell Roan that prompted her to address how she perceived her gender, recalling, "I'm a woman except for the days when I'm a man." Prior to announcing "Man of the Year", Lorde donned a custom Thom Browne look at the Met Gala including a suit jacket, slate skirt, and strip of fabric covering her chest, which she described as an Easter egg for the album that simultaneously expressed her gender identity. Retrospectively, some media outlets speculated the look was an Easter egg for the "Man of the Year" single cover and music video.

Lorde announced "Man of the Year" through a teaser clip posted on Instagram on 20 May 2025, revealing it would release on 29 May alongside a music video. Along with the announcement, the singer posted a fifteen-second clip of the track on her TikTok account. The song was the second single from Virgin, following the lead single "What Was That". In the announcement, Lorde called "Man of the Year" "an offering from really deep inside" and noted it was the song she was proudest of from the album. In an interview with Australian radio show Triple J, Lorde shared that she began writing the song with Jim-E Stack the day after she attended a GQ 'Men of the Year' party in November 2023. She remarked that she "had been feeling this expansiveness of gender happening for a while," and felt uncomfortable in the form-fitting gown and heels she had worn to the event. Before writing "Man of the Year", Lorde was sitting on her living room floor hungover, "trying to visualize a version of [her]self that was fully representative of how [her] gender felt in that moment." She envisioned herself in men's jeans, wearing only a gold chain and duct tape on her chest—an image she said felt raw and impermanent. The cover art for the single was shot by Talia Chetrit and depicts Lorde wearing blue jeans, topless with her chest taped down by silver duct tape. The day prior to the song's release, Lorde staged a pop-up event in Auckland, New Zealand, in which she played the song for fans in a YMCA bathroom.

== Composition and lyrics ==
Lorde wrote and produced "Man of the Year" with American record producer Jim-E Stack. It is a downtempo, pop, and industrial ballad. The song begins with a minimalist bassline led by a plucked bass guitar, that crescendoes into a crest of drums in the finale, incorporating cymbals, gravelly synths, keyboards, and cello. Alexis Petridis of The Guardian noted the end of the song as "panic-inducing," while Gil Kaufman of Billboard described it as a "noisy rumble" dominated by "burbling keyboards and distant drums." The song's structure drew comparisons to Lorde's "Green Light" (2017) and her cover of Frank Ocean's "Solo" (2016), which she covered on her Melodrama World Tour (2017–18). Andy Lalwani of Gayety remarked that the track avoids the format of traditional pop songs.

The lyrics of the song reflect on Lorde's gender identity and self-expression. The song begins in a loud whisper. In the first verse, she sings, "Take my knife and I cut the cord / My babe can't believe I've become someone else / Someone more like myself." Julianna Marie of Her Campus took this to be an allusion to a comment from the singer's interview with Rolling Stone, where she had shared, "I had cut some sort of cord between myself and this regulated femininity." In the chorus, Lorde wonders if anyone else will fully understand her gender in the same way: "Who's gon' love me like this / Oh-oh, oh, who could get me like this?" Samantha Olson of Cosmopolitan described the second verse as taking on a masculine alter ego "unafraid to 'swish mouthwash and jerk off'," comparing it to Beyoncé's 2008 single "If I Were a Boy". At the end of the song, the lyrics questions her capacity for love after being "broken open." Olson noted several lyrical similarities throughout the song to the lyrics and visuals of "What Was That". Jillian Giandurco of Nylon theorized the song was inspired by a breakup, with the lyrics describing Lorde's realization that she can fill the shoes of her ex-boyfriend.

== Commercial performance ==
In Lorde's home country of New Zealand, "Man of the Year" debuted and peaked at number 11 on the singles chart. The song had minor chart placements elsewhere in the English-speaking world, namely in Ireland (56), the United Kingdom (62), Canada (85), and Australia (92). The single also entered the Billboard Global 200 at number 173. While the song did not enter the Hot 100 in the United States, it topped the Bubbling Under Hot 100 chart, an extension to the Hot 100 chart, and peaked at number 14 on Hot Rock & Alternative Songs.

== Critical reception ==
"Man of the Year" was met with praise from music critics who commended the song's emotional vulnerability. Vulture's Fran Hoepfner praised the track, and called it "anything but an artistic retread" that "takes all that's made the last three albums great and funnels it into one whole song". Writing for the LGBTQ magazine Gayety, Andy Lalwani praised the song as a "masterpiece." In NME's review of Virgin, Alex Rigotti commended the production as "admirably unpolished", conveying the idea of the singer "chipping away at her own sculpture in real time." The Independent's Helen Brown remarked that the song "gracefully captured" the sense of vivaciousness Lorde expressed in her second studio album, Melodrama (2017). Writing for Billboard, Gil Kaufman described the single as "entrancing." Lauren Hague of Clash wrote that, despite some silent parts of the song "dampening the song's atmosphere", "Man of the Year" was evidence of Jim-E Stack's talent in the context of the album.

Other critics were skeptical of the song's instrumentation and structure. In a mixed review, Walden Green of Pitchfork wrote that the song "doesn't have peaks or valleys; it goes up and up and up and then it's gone." Alexis Petridis of The Guardian gave a similarly lukewarm review of the song, describing the "weirdly clipped-sounding drums" as excessively loud, "soak[ing] everything else, including the vocals," while Paste's Matt Mitchell commended the drums as "delightful". The Arts Desk's James Mellen had a negative opinion of the track, describing it and "Hammer" as "jittery, hookless melodies."

== Music video ==
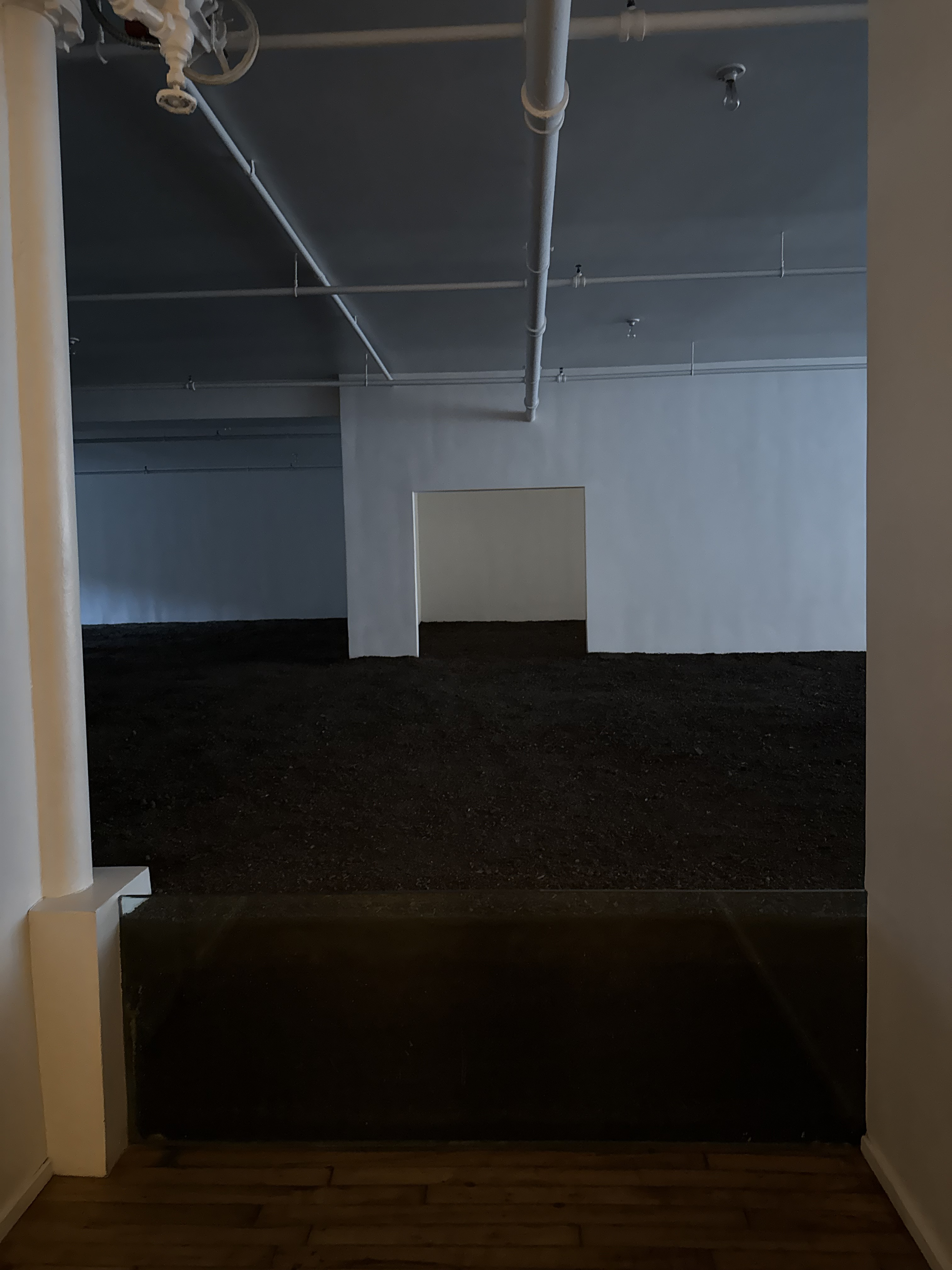
Critics noted similarities between the music video's setting and the art installation The New York Earth Room.

A music video for the song was released alongside the single, directed by Grant Singer and shot on 35 mm film. The video begins with a close-up of Lorde, panning out to reveal her sitting on a stool in an empty loft wearing jeans and a white t-shirt. As the video progresses, she strips off her shirt to bind her chest with duct tape, alluding to the binding experience that inspired the song in the first place, and dances in a pile of soil spread out in a corner of the loft. The video concludes with the singer curling into a ball in stillness. Several critics compared the setting of the video to the permanent art installation The New York Earth Room, an apartment filled with soil by artist Walter De Maria in New York City; indeed, Lorde referenced the installation in the announcement for the song on her website, writing that she was "trying to make it sound like [...] the New York Earth Room."

Several music critics commended the symbolism of the video. Gil Kaufman of Billboard called the video a "striking visual." Writing for ARTnews, Tessa Solomon stated that "the tape becomes a means of liberation as she leaps, crawls, and cavorts through the dirt pile in a mad modern dance." In her review for Virgin, Pitchfork's Olivia Horn described Lorde as being "tapped into some elemental lifeforce" in the video, representative of an album "pregnant with possibility, blissfully abstract, ripe for interpretation." Julianna Marie of Her Campus opined that the dirt was symbolic of exploring one's gender in a society where the gender binary is strictly enforced. Fran Hopefner of Vulture remarked that the brightness of the video reflected "clear eyed-optimism rather than the gold-tinged fantasy of Solar Power."

== Credits and personnel ==
Credits adapted from the liner notes of Virgin.

- Lorde – composition, production, vocals
- Jim-E Stack – composition, production, engineering, bass guitar, drum programming, keyboards, synthesizer
- Koby Berman – additional engineering
- Tom Elmhirst – mixing
- Chris Gehringer – mastering
- Dev Hynes – bass guitar, cello
- Bailey Kislak – additional engineering
- Jack Manning – additional engineering
- Will Quinnell – mastering
- Eli Teplin – keyboards, piano

== Charts ==
Chart performance for "Man of the Year"
Chart (2025)	Peak position
Australia (ARIA)	92
Canada Hot 100 (Billboard)	85
Global 200 (Billboard)	173
Ireland (IRMA)	56
New Zealand (Recorded Music NZ)	11
UK Singles (Official Charts)	62
US Bubbling Under Hot 100 (Billboard)	1
US Hot Rock & Alternative Songs (Billboard)	14
