= Fabiana Palladino =

English singer-songwriter and musician

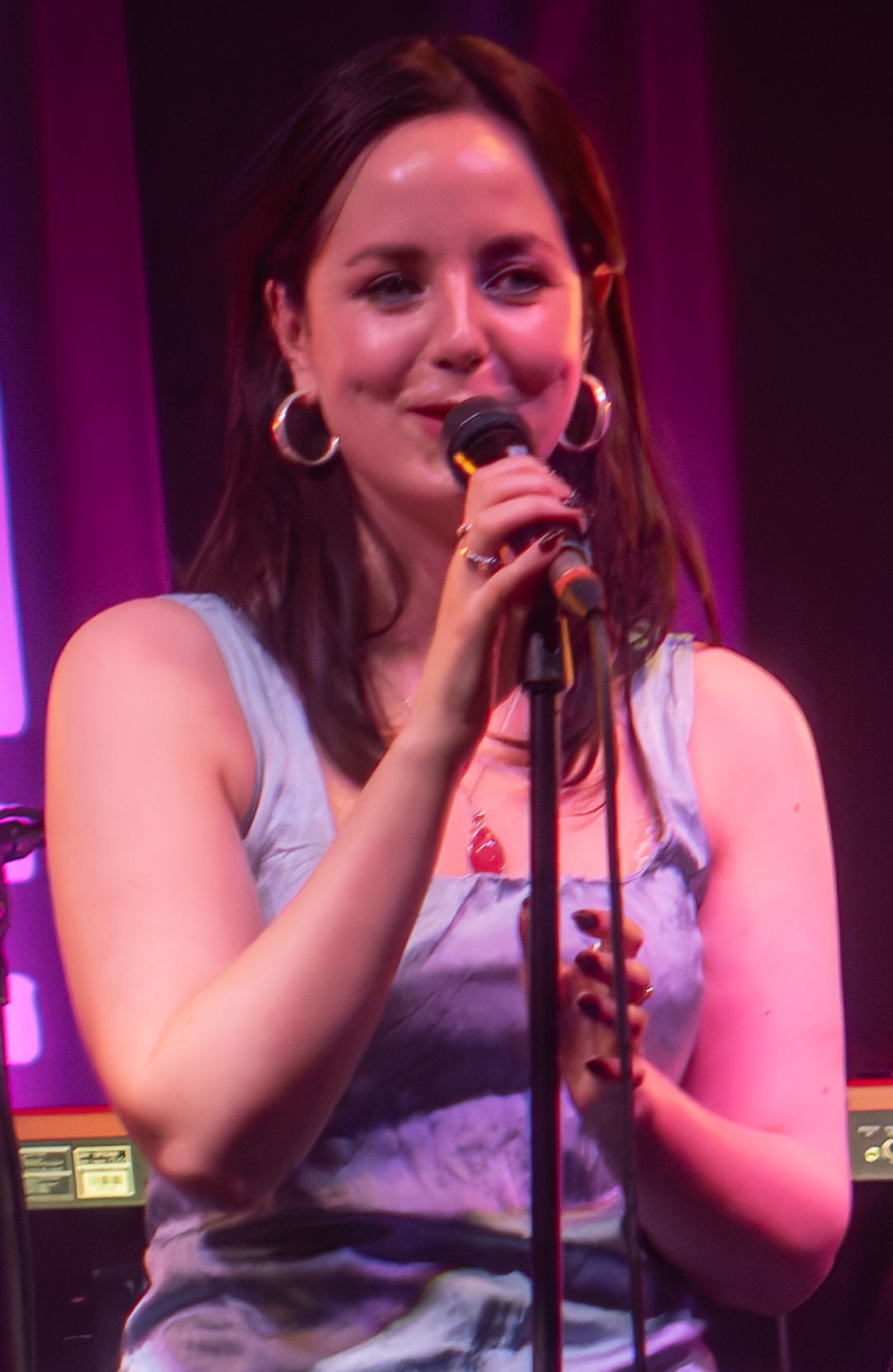
- Palladino in 2024

Background information
- Born: Fabiana Elizabeth Palladino; 1987 (age 38–39)
- Genres: Pop; synth-pop; sophisti-pop; R&B; funk; soul pop
- Instruments: Vocals; piano; keyboard
- Years active: 2007–present
- Labels: Paul Institute; XL Recordings; Double Denim Records
- Website: www.fabianapalladino.com

Fabiana Elizabeth Palladino (born 1987) is an English singer-songwriter and instrumentalist. She began her career uploading demos to Myspace and SoundCloud, releasing an EP and her debut single "For You" (2014) via Double Denim Records, and as a session and touring musician. Discovered by Jai Paul and signed to his label the Paul Institute, through which she released the singles "Mystery" (2017) and "Shimmer" (2018), her self-titled debut album was released in 2024.

== Early life and education ==
Palladino was born in central London, the daughter of Welsh musician Pino Palladino and former backing singer Marilyn (née Roberts). Despite her family's "richly musical household" and playing piano and drums from a young age, she did not intend to pursue music professionally. Palladino joined Groove Academy in her teens. She began her studies in English at Goldsmiths, University of London before switching to the Music Theory course.

== Career ==
During university in 2007, Palladino began uploading music demos to Myspace, starting with an untitled song about anxiety. She self-released an EP titled Long Nights of War in December 2011. It was via Myspace she connected with fellow musicians Ghostpoet and Sampha. She collaborated with Ghostpoet on one of his first singles "Survive It" (2011). Sampha produced and Ghostpoet contributed to Palladino's 2014 single "For You", her first release under Double Denim Records. This was followed by another single "Young Thing" in 2015. Palladino met Laura Groves through Timmaz Zolleyn, performing live with their band Nautic, and Jessie Ware through her brother and then-boyfriend, who toured in Ware's band. Palladino was invited to music sessions for Ware as well as for Sbtrkt and The Maccabees.

Jai Paul discovered Palladino on SoundCloud while she was working in the Old Vic box office and subsequently signed her to his and his brother's new label the Paul Institute, through which Palladino released one of the label's inaugural singles "Mystery" in 2017. "Shimmer" followed in 2018. Palladino began working on an EP, but decided to make it a full album instead when she signed an album deal with the Paul Institute and XL Recordings. In the interim, she penned the song "Waiting" to feature on the Paul Institute's Summer 2020 EP.

In 2023, Palladino and her brother Rocco Palladino performed in Paul's band at his Coachella debut. Paul featured on her single "I Care" later that year.

Accompanied by the singles "Stay With Me Through the Night" and "I Can't Dream Anymore", Palladino's self-titled debut album was released in 2024 to critical acclaim. The album comprises tracks originally intended for the aforementioned EP, as well as tracks written during the COVID-19 lockdown when Palladino moved back into her parents' home after a breakup, musing on the isolation of the time. The single "Drunk" followed later in the year. Also in 2024, she had her first headline concert dates as a solo artist and performed at the Great Escape Festival and BST Hyde Park.

In April 2025, it was announced that Palladino had made additional production contributions to Lorde's upcoming fourth studio album Virgin alongside Blood Orange's Dev Hynes, Dan Nigro, Andrew Aged of Inc. No World and Buddy Ross. Specifically, she worked on the tracks "Current Affairs" (6) and "If She Could See Me Now" (10) as audio engineer. She also featured on fellow art-soul-pop musician Joviale's debut album Mount Crystal, which released September 2025.

== Artistry ==
When she was a child, her parents would play soul and Motown, including Aretha Franklin and Donny Hathaway, while Palladino had an interest in mainstream pop acts such as Spice Girls and Craig David and was introduced to R&B through her cousins. Through a university friend, she discovered and became inspired by Kate Bush's album Hounds of Love (1985), as well as David Bowie and Peter Gabriel. Sonically, Palladino draws upon eras including the 1970s, the 1980s, and the 2000s. Other artists she has named as influences include Brandy and Janet Jackson. She also references literature, such as His Dark Materials on her 2017 single "Mystery". Her 2020 single "Waiting" took inspiration from Joe Jackson, Squeeze, early Police, and Prince.

== Discography ==
=== Albums ===
- Fabiana Palladino (2024)

=== EPs ===
- Long Nights of War (2011)

=== Singles ===
- "For You" (2014)
- "Young Thing" (2015)
- "Mystery" (2017)
- "Shimmer" (2018)
- "Waiting" (2020) (part of Summer 2020)
- "I Care" (2023)
- "Stay with Me Through the Night" (2024)
- "I Can't Dream Anymore" (2024)
- "Drunk" (2024)

=== As featured artist ===
- "Yes" (2025) by Laura Groves with Joviale
