= What Was That =

2025 single by Lorde

Single by Lorde

from the album Virgin
- Released: 24 April 2025
- Studio: Electric Lady (New York City)
- Genre: Synth-pop; dance; electropop
- Length: 3:29
- Label: Universal New Zealand; Republic
- Songwriters: Ella Yelich-O'Connor; James Harmon Stack
- Producers: Lorde; Jim-E Stack; Daniel Nigro

Lorde singles chronology
"Secrets from a Girl (Who's Seen It All)" (2022)	"What Was That" (2025)	"Man of the Year" (2025)

Music video
- "What Was That" on YouTube

"What Was That" is a song by New Zealand singer-songwriter Lorde. It was released on 24 April 2025 through Universal and Republic Records as the lead single from her fourth studio album, Virgin (2025). Lorde and Jim-E Stack wrote the track, and they produced it with Dan Nigro. "What Was That" is a synth-pop, dance, and electropop song, with a drum instrumentation inspired by the drums on the 2007 song "Reckoner" by English rock band Radiohead. In the lyrics, the narrator reminisces about a previous relationship and its aftermath.

The song received positive reviews from music critics, who praised its lyrics and its production elements, which received comparisons to her earlier works. It was included in Rolling Stone's best songs of 2025, reached number one in New Zealand, and charted inside the top 20 in Australia, the United Kingdom, and the Billboard Global 200 chart. Lorde and Terrence O'Connor directed the music video for "What Was That", which shows Lorde walking alone through various parts of New York City before culminating in a spontaneous dance performance at Washington Square Park, where she was surrounded by fans recording the moment.

== Background and promotion ==
Following the release of her third studio album, Solar Power (2021), Lorde only gave sporadic updates and hints of being in the recording studio. In February 2023, she confirmed to Ensemble Magazine that she had started working on her fourth studio album, admitting that it would take her a long time to return. In July 2024, Lorde shared a brief clip of new music on her Instagram stories. The next month, it was confirmed that she teamed up with American musician Jim-E Stack for the album.

On 9 April 2025, Lorde first shared a snippet of an unreleased track to her TikTok account. The clip shows the singer walking through Washington Square Park in New York City. The song was subsequently labeled "WWT", an acronym for "What Was That". At the same time, the singer blanked her official website and her Instagram feed while changing her profile picture to a water bottle. Lorde announced the song on 16 April 2025 through her social media. She simultaneously shared the artwork on her Instagram that depicts herself in a bright red T-shirt staring at the camera while water drips from her face. The aesthetic of the picture, taken by American photographer Talia Chetrit, drew comparisons to Marina Abramović's 2010 performance The Artist Is Present.

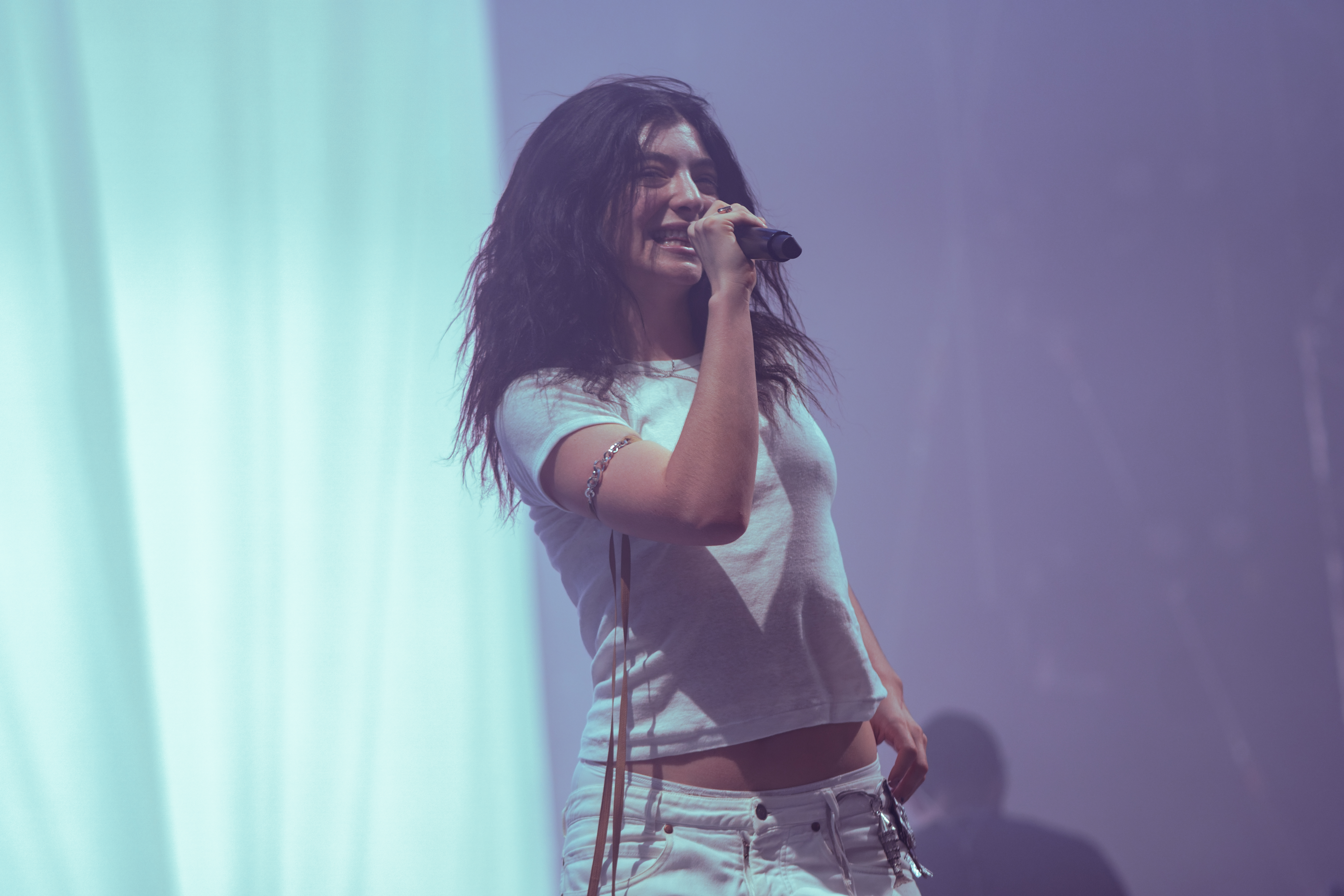
Lorde performing "What Was That" at Glastonbury Festival 2025

On 22 April, Lorde posted an Instagram story and sent a text message telling fans to go to Washington Square Park in New York City at 19:00 Eastern Daylight Time (EDT) (UTC−04:00) that night. Following the attendance of a large number of fans, the event was shut down shortly before it was scheduled to begin. A spokesperson from the New York City Police Department told Vulture they were alerted to an "unscheduled event" in the park, as well as stating that Lorde "did not possess either [of the permits required]" to host the event. Lorde's collaborator Dev Hynes played the track on a portable speaker to fans, before her arrival at the park around 21:30 EDT. The next day, Lorde announced that "What Was That" would be released at midnight.

Upon the song's release, Lorde's website was updated with a candid note, detailing the origins of the track. In the note, Lorde revealed that the song was conceived during a tumultuous period in late 2023. She described experiencing a "deep breakup" and the emotional upheaval that followed, writing: "Every meal a battle. Flashbacks and waves. Feeling grief's vortex and letting it take me. Opening my mouth and recording what fell out."

Lorde debuted "What Was That" at the Glastonbury Festival as part of an unannounced set on 27 June, the same day Virgin was released. She went on to include it on the set of her ongoing Ultrasound World Tour (2025–26).

== Production and composition ==
Lorde co-wrote "What Was That" with Jim-E Stack and co-produced it alongside Stack and Daniel Nigro. Stack played piano, drums, keyboards, and synthesisers, while Nigro played piano, synthesisers, bass guitar, and electric guitar. The track was engineered by Stack, Nigro, and Jack Manning; mixed by Chris Gehringer and Spike Stent; and mastered by Will Quinnell. Nigro additionally provided drum programming, while Koby Berman worked as an additional engineer. "What Was That" also features electric guitar work by Andrew Aged of Inc. No World.

"What Was That" is 3 minutes and 29 seconds long and is primarily structured around two verses and two choruses. It is an electropop, synth-pop, and dance track, with a midtempo arrangement and reflective lyrics about a past relationship, nostalgia, and personal growth. Lorde's vocals are accompanied by an electronic beat, a minimalist bassline, light percussion, and subtle, syncopated synths that gradually build up. The drum instrumentation of "What Was That" was inspired by the drums on Radiohead's 2007 song "Reckoner". According to MusicRadar's Ben Rogerson, the drums were possibly created directly on Radiohead's original track, which was made available for download by fans so that they could create their own remixes.

Lyrically, the song's narrator reflects on times spent with her partner taking "MDMA in the back garden" and kissing "for hours straight". Although she has moved on, she expresses pain and regret, stating that she covered "up all the mirrors" because she could not "see myself yet" in the aftermath of the relationship. Towards the end of the track, the narrator gradually reconciles with the idea of moving on ("When I'm in the blue light, I can make it alright / What was that?").

Several music journalists drew parallels between "What Was That" and Lorde's second studio album, Melodrama (2017). NME's Surej Singh thought that the song recalled the "hazy narrative" of Melodrama in both its themes and melodies. Rhian Daly from the same magazine commented that unlike Melodrama's attempt to move past pain, the narrator in "What Was That" accepted the idea of "memories [...] haunting her". Daly also compared "What Was That" to Melodrama's lead single, "Green Light", but thought that it displayed less intense emotional and sonic peaks.

== Critical reception ==
"What Was That" received critical acclaim upon release. Robin Murray of Clash gave the song a 9/10 and noted that she is reclaiming center stage with the multi-faceted pop ambition of "Green Light", while refusing to re-tread old ground. In a positive review, Mark Beaumont of The Independent noted that Lorde "returns to what she does best: crafting melancholic, minimal yet monumental tracks for heartbroken souls." NME writer Rhian Daly gave "What Was That" four out of five stars, writing that the track lacks a "killer punch", but Lorde shines in her emotive, electric style, effectively recreating a "dance-in-the-dark" atmosphere. Rolling Stone included the song on its "Best Songs of 2025" mid-year list, and described it as "deliciously haunted by the ghosts of her Melodrama sound".

There were some mixed reviews regarding the song's sparse production and lyrics. In mixed reviews of the song, Paolo Ragusa of Consequence wrote that "while it's not the most adventurous new offering from the singer, it does teem with maturity and wisdom" finding it "authentic and refreshing", but in its production "feels a lot like a step sideways than a leap in any direction". Walden Green from Pitchfork stated that while Lorde's "writing is as evocative and rich as ever", the track production is "bloodless", noting that it is less riveting than the singer's past works such as "Green Light" and "Hard Feelings/Loveless".

=== Accolades ===
Publication	Accolade	Rank	Ref.
Exclaim!	20 Best Songs of 2025	11	
Rolling Stone	Every Lorde Song Ranked	11	
Time Out	The 40 best songs of 2025	26	

== Music video ==
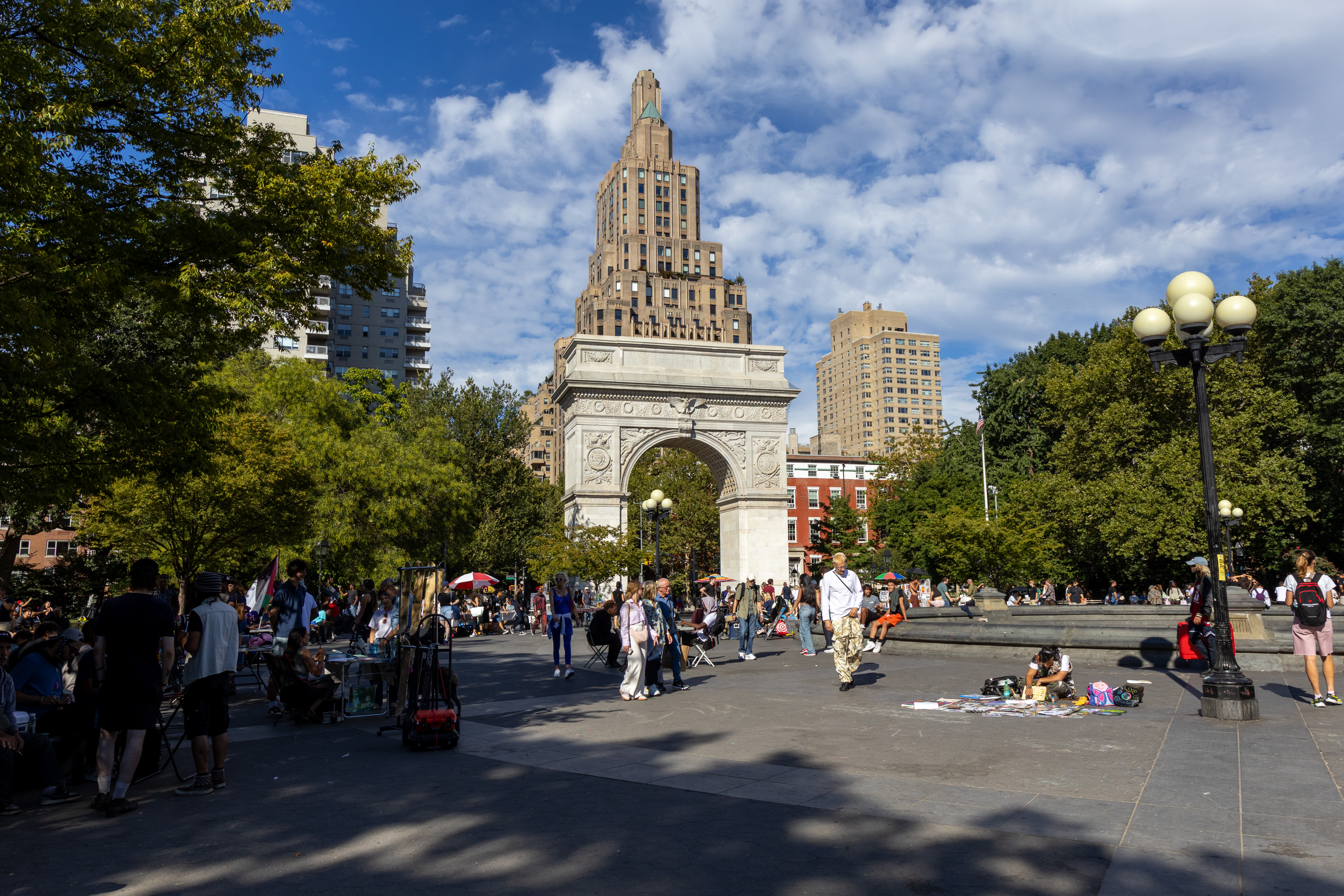
Washington Square Park, one of the various filming locations for the music video, seen in September 2025.

The music video for "What Was That" was filmed across various locations in New York City. In the video, Lorde is seen walking and biking alone around the East Side of Manhattan, dressed in a white button shirt and jeans, complemented with silver accessories and a keychain. At times, the shirt is left open, revealing a black bikini top. She then emerges through a manhole and arrives at Washington Square Park, where she dances as fans record her with their phones.

== Credits and personnel ==
Credits are adapted from Qobuz.

- Lorde – vocals, songwriter, producer
- Jim-E Stack – songwriter, producer, engineer, piano, synthesisers, keyboards, drums, drum programmer
- Daniel Nigro – producer, engineer, piano, synthesisers, bass guitar, electric guitar
- Chris Gehringer – mixing engineer
- Spike Stent – mixing engineer
- Will Quinnell – mastering engineer
- Jack Manning – engineer
- Koby Berman – additional engineer
- Andrew Aged – electric guitar

== Charts ==
=== Weekly charts ===
Weekly chart performance for "What Was That"
Chart (2025)	Peak position
Australia (ARIA)	9
Austria (Ö3 Austria Top 40)	19
Belgium (Ultratop 50 Flanders)	45
Canada Hot 100 (Billboard)	31
Colombia Anglo Airplay (Monitor Latino)	13
Croatia International Airplay (Top lista)	40
Czech Republic Singles Digital (ČNS IFPI)	70
Estonia Airplay (TopHit)	19
Germany (GfK)	33
Global 200 (Billboard)	18
Greece International (IFPI)	28
Ireland (IRMA)	6
Israel International Airplay (Media Forest)	18
Italy Airplay (EarOne)	43
Japan Hot Overseas (Billboard Japan)	12
Latvia Streaming (LaIPA)	16
Lithuania (AGATA)	26
Lithuania Airplay (TopHit)	40
Netherlands (Single Top 100)	83
New Zealand (Recorded Music NZ)	1
Norway (VG-lista)	43
Panama Anglo Airplay (Monitor Latino)	11
Poland (Polish Streaming Top 100)	93
Portugal (AFP)	67
San Marino Airplay (SMRTV Top 50)	31
Slovakia Airplay (ČNS IFPI)	60
Slovakia (Singles Digitál Top 100)	74
Sweden (Sverigetopplistan)	54
Switzerland (Schweizer Hitparade)	33
UK Singles (OCC)	11
US Billboard Hot 100	36
US Hot Rock & Alternative Songs (Billboard)	6

=== Monthly charts ===
Monthly chart performance for "What Was That"
Chart (2025)	Peak position
Estonia Airplay (TopHit)	20
Lithuania Airplay (TopHit)	55

=== Year-end charts ===
Year-end chart performance for "What Was That"
Chart (2025)	Position
US Hot Rock & Alternative Songs (Billboard)	29

== Certifications ==
Certifications for "What Was That"
Region	Certification	Certified units/sales
Australia (ARIA)	Gold	35,000^{‡}
Brazil (Pro-Música Brasil)	Platinum	40,000^{‡}
Canada (Music Canada)	Gold	40,000^{‡}
New Zealand (RMNZ)	Gold	15,000^{‡}
United Kingdom (BPI)	Silver	200,000^{‡}
^{‡} Sales+streaming figures based on certification alone.

== Release history ==
Release dates and formats for "What Was That"
Region	Date	Format(s)	Label	Ref.
Various	24 April 2025	Digital download; streaming	Universal New Zealand; Republic	
United States	28 April 2025	Adult alternative radio	Republic	
United States	29 April 2025	Alternative radio	Republic	
Italy	2 May 2025	Radio airplay	Universal	
