= Leak 04-13 (Bait Ones) =

Demo album by Jai Paul

Demo album by Jai Paul
- Released: 1 June 2019 (Note: While this is its official release date per XL Recordings, the demo album was initially leaked online on 13 April 2013 under the unofficial title Jai Paul.)
- Recorded: 2007–2013
- Studio: Paul's home studio (Rayners Lane, London); Studio 13 (London)
- Genre: Pop; R&B
- Length: 37:07
- Label: XL
- Producer: Jai Paul

Singles from Leak 04-13 (Bait Ones)
- 1. "BTSTU" Released: 21 April 2011; 2. "Jasmine" Released: 9 April 2012

Leak 04-13 (Bait Ones), commonly referred to by its subtitle Bait Ones, is a demo album and the debut project by British musician Jai Paul. It was released on 1 June 2019 by XL Recordings.

The album, which mostly consists of unfinished songs and demos recorded between 2007 and 2013, was initially leaked and illegally sold through Bandcamp under the title Jai Paul on 13 April 2013. Following the incident, Paul largely withdrew from public view and took an extended hiatus from music production. Despite the unauthorized release, some publications ranked the leaked project on their year-end best-of lists, including Pitchfork and The Guardian.

Six years after the leak, Bait Ones was officially released by Paul. Only the album's singles, "BTSTU" and "Jasmine", had previously been given official releases. Bait Ones received critical acclaim for Paul's unique production style, which was praised for its blend of various genres including electronic music, hip-hop, and R&B. Several artists including Snoop Dogg, have cited the album as an influence on their work and contemporary popular music in general. It debuted at number 100 on the US Billboard 200, and was named as one of the best albums of the 2010s by Pitchfork.

== Background ==
In 2010, Paul's 2007 demo recording "BTSTU" began to receive extensive coverage from music blogs. Paul subsequently attracted interest from multiple record companies, sparking a bidding war; he eventually signed with XL Recordings later that year. In December 2010, the BBC had named Paul as a contender for their Sound of 2011 poll, praising his style as a "startlingly fresh vision of 21st-century pop music". "BTSTU" also had an impact on contemporary pop music, with the track being sampled by Canadian rapper Drake on a track titled "Dreams Money Can Buy" in May 2011 and American singer Beyoncé on "End of Time" from her 2011 album 4. The song garnered critical acclaim, appearing on several publications' end-of-year lists in 2011, including Pitchfork and Pigeons and Planes.

On 30 March 2012, Paul uploaded a new demo titled "Jasmine" to his official SoundCloud page. "Jasmine" received similarly positive reviews, with critics praising its production and likening it to the works of Prince, D'Angelo and J Dilla.

== Leak and official release ==
On 13 April 2013, a bootleg album titled Jai Paul, consisting of "BTSTU", "Jasmine" and 14 previously unreleased recordings by Paul, was uploaded for sale on Bandcamp. Hours after the leak, music press began to report the unofficial project as Paul's debut album. Paul later confirmed on his Twitter account that the release was unauthorized.

An investigation by the City of London Police resulted in the arrests of two suspects, and refunds were given to those who purchased the bootleg. Following the incident, Paul largely withdrew from public view and did not publish any material prior to the 2019 reissue of Bait Ones. In a statement accompanying the official album's release, Paul said he was in "complete shock" after learning of the leak, and speculated that it may have originated from a "burned CD that got misplaced". He characterised the experience as "a catastrophe", and admitted that he was disillusioned by media coverage suggesting the leak was intentional:

Everyone was convinced that the story they had read online – that I'd leaked the music myself – was true, so I had to repeatedly explain the reality of the situation over and over again. It was frustrating and disorientating to find that I had no ownership over the story (or the music) and that people were choosing to believe a different truth. I guess this all made it feel like I had thousands of people not believing me, not trusting me, and also that in some strange way I was responsible for all of it.

Paul disclosed that the incident had greatly impacted his ability to work and only after "therapy of various kinds" had he begun to consider a return to music, stating that he did not want to deny people from hearing the project. Bait Ones was officially released on 1 June 2019 through XL Recordings as a pay-what-you-want download on Paul's website, in conjunction with a "double B-side single" featuring two songs recorded during the original album sessions, "Do You Love Her Now" and "He". The official release features the tracks in the same sequence as they appeared in the 2013 leak. The album debuted at number 100 on the Billboard 200 alongside entering at number six on the US Heatseekers Albums and number 20 on the US Independent Albums charts. Paul indicated that ten percent of the profits on Bait Ones merchandise would be pledged to the British mental health charity SANE.

On 13 April 2023, a decade after the album's leak, XL Recordings announced the first vinyl release of the album, limited to 3,000 copies.

== Production and style ==
"BTSTU"
A sample of "BTSTU" as it appears on the 2019 release, described by Pitchfork as "propulsive and elusive, like quicksand pumping out of a speaker cone, with Paul's mumbling falsetto self-consciously buried in the mix".

All of the material on Bait Ones was recorded during a period roughly between 2007 and 2013 in Paul's home studio in the Rayners Lane district of Harrow in northwest London, with additional sessions for the demo version of "Jasmine" being recorded at Studio 13. On the album, Paul incorporates a distinctive production style, drawing influence from pop music, electronic music, hip-hop and R&B. Paul used samples from Bollywood movie soundtracks, R&B, classical music and clips from the Harry Potter films, Tomb Raider video games and Gossip Girl, the latter of which were absent from the official release due to sample clearance issues. A cover of Jennifer Paige's 1998 song "Crush" also appears on the album.

The album consists of 16 songs, most of which remain in their unfinished states with minimal retouching aside from higher fidelity adjustments. Ryan Dombal of Pitchfork called the incomplete tracks "eternal works in progress", commenting that Paul's decision to keep the original mixes untouched "seems less like soothsaying and more like a compulsion". Shaad D'Souza of The Fader said that the album "exists in no discernible scene or genre because it draws from many", and described the production as being "like Phil Collins produced by SOPHIE". Bijan Stephen of The Nation characterised Paul's raw production on Bait Ones as a combination of "fuzzed-out synths, chattering percussion, vocals almost buried in the mix, and a highly eclectic approach to sampling".

== Critical reception ==
Professional ratings
Review scores
Source	Rating
The Line of Best Fit	10/10
Pitchfork	8.9/10

Following its leak in 2013, Bait Ones received mixed reviews. Lindsay Zoladz of Pitchfork praised the album as "brimming with ideas, innovation, and eccentric personality", and described Paul as "somebody moonwalking through the overcrowded digital world with a mysterious, elegantly curated grace." However, Alex Macpherson of The Quietus panned the album, calling it "a load of old cobblers", criticising the "lack of mastering" and suggesting that the leak was a publicity stunt orchestrated by Paul and XL Recordings.

Upon its official release in 2019, Bait Ones received critical acclaim. Rory Foster of The Line of Best Fit dubbed the album "one of the great records of the decade", and described Paul's style as a "mythic sound the likes hadn't been heard anywhere". Ryan Domal of Pitchfork praised Bait Ones as "a miracle of cultural synthesis, in which a young British man of Indian descent gloriously expands what pop music can be", and lauded its production as "the sound of borders breaking, of traditions mingling, of a utopian closeness that so often seems so far away."

=== Accolades ===
Many publications named the 2013 collection of leaked material to their year-end best-of lists. Pitchfork ranked it at number 20 on their list of the top 50 albums of 2013, and The Guardian ranked it at number 28 in their top 40 albums of 2013. Fact ranked it at number 12 on their 50 best albums of 2013, stating that "the frowzy, half-finished production suits the material down to the ground." In August 2014, Pitchfork ranked the bootleg at number 99 in "The 100 Best Albums of the Decade So Far", calling it "polyglot space-funk that sounds like it's being beamed in from another star".

In 2019, Pitchfork ranked Bait Ones at number 95 on their list of the 200 best albums of the 2010s, stating that the album "remains an appealingly unpolished, timeless capsule of shaggy beat experiments, space-age funk workouts" and commented, "What already felt beamed in from a thrilling, genre-agnostic future at the onset of the 2010s was given a deserved revisit and reality check by the end of the decade."

Year-end lists
Publication	List	Rank	Ref.
Fact	The 50 Best Albums of 2013	12	
The Guardian	The Best Albums of 2013	28	
Pitchfork	The Top 50 Albums of 2013	20	

Decade-end lists
Publication	List	Rank	Ref.
Pitchfork	The 100 Best Albums of the Decade So Far (2010–2014)	99	
Pitchfork	The 200 Best Albums of the 2010s	95	

== Legacy ==
Multiple artists, including Lorde, Dijon, Jungle, Flume, Mura Masa, Kenny Beats, Disclosure, Dan Snaith, Jadu Heart, Nao, Demo Taped and Kindness have praised or cited Bait Ones as an influence on their work. Ed Sheeran, Arlo Parks, and Octavian have recorded covers of the track "Jasmine". In a 2017 interview with Zane Lowe, Mura Masa stated that "the Jai Paul album influenced everyone, everything." Flume named "BTSTU" as an inspiration for his 2019 mixtape Hi This Is Flume, saying that he "had never heard anything like that, I was really inspired." He added:

Again, that's one of the songs that I was like, 'That's what I want this project to sound like.' It's grown and changed since then, but for the first record that was definitely one of the main influences. It's such a unique sound, and it really doesn't happen that often, when something comes along and changes music that much.

== Track listing ==
All tracks written and produced by Jai Paul, except where noted.

Leak 04-13 (Bait Ones) track listing
No.	Title	Writer(s)	Length
1.	"One of the Bredrins"		0:10
2.	"Str8 Outta Mumbai"		2:42
3.	"Zion Wolf Theme" (unfinished)		3:07
4.	"Garden of Paradise" (instrumental; unfinished)		1:16
5.	"Genevieve" (unfinished)		3:57
6.	"Raw Beat" (unfinished)		0:29
7.	"Crush" (unfinished)	Andy Goldmark; Kevin Clark; Berry Cosgrove; Clifford Mueller	3:45
8.	"Good Time"		0:27
9.	"Jasmine" (demo)	Jai Paul; Anup Paul	4:13
10.	"100,000" (unfinished)		2:55
11.	"Vibin'" (unfinished)		2:43
12.	"Baby Beat" (unfinished)		0:40
13.	"Desert River" (unfinished)		3:05
14.	"Chix" (unfinished)		0:56
15.	"All Night" (unfinished)		3:12
16.	"BTSTU" (demo)		3:30
Total length:			37:07

Samples

- "Str8 Outta Mumbai" contains a sample of "Baala Main Bairaagan Hoongi" by Vani Jairam and Ravi Shankar.
- "Crush" is a cover of "Crush", written by Andy Goldmark, Kevin Clark, Berry Cosgrove and Clifford Mueller, and performed by Jennifer Paige.
- "Baby Beat" contains a sample of "All My Life" by K-Ci & JoJo.
- "Chix" contains a sample of Adagio for Strings by Samuel Barber.

== Personnel ==
Credits are adapted from Paul's website.

- Jai Paul – vocals, guitars, drums, synthesisers, programming, SFX, sound design, engineering, mixing
- Anup Paul – bass guitar (9), additional vocals (16), sound design (9, 16), additional engineering (9)
- Sam Pickering – saxophone (16)
- Duncan Fuller – engineering
- Lexxx – engineering
- Guy Davie – mastering

== Charts ==
2019 weekly chart performance for Leak 04-13 (Bait Ones)
Chart (2019)	Peak position
UK Album Downloads (Official Charts)	14
UK Independent Albums (Official Charts)	15
US Billboard 200	100
US Heatseekers Albums (Billboard)	6
US Independent Albums (Billboard)	20

2023 weekly chart performance for Leak 04-13 (Bait Ones)
Chart (2023)	Peak position
Scottish Albums (Official Charts)	33
UK Albums (Official Charts)	60
UK Independent Albums (Official Charts)	11
