= Virgin (Lorde album) =

Studio album by Lorde
- Released: 27 June 2025
- Studios: Electric Lady (New York City); Barefeet Welcome (Los Angeles); Strongroom (London); Flux (New York); Studio 13 (London); Amusement (Los Angeles); Heavy Duty (Los Angeles); The Black Taj (London); XL Recording (New York City); Henson Recording (Los Angeles); Panther Palace (Los Angeles) (Note: Additional recording); Smilo Sound (Brooklyn) (Note: Strings recording)
- Genres: Synth-pop; dance-pop; electropop; art pop
- Length: 34:51
- Labels: Universal New Zealand; Republic
- Producers: Lorde; Jim-E Stack; Dan Nigro; Buddy Ross

Lorde chronology
| Te Ao Mārama (2021) | Virgin (2025) |

Singles from Virgin
- 1. "What Was That" Released: 24 April 2025; 2. "Man of the Year" Released: 29 May 2025; 3. "Hammer" Released: 20 June 2025

Virgin is the fourth studio album by New Zealand singer-songwriter Lorde. It was released on 27 June 2025 through Universal Music New Zealand and Republic Records which also marked the last release through both labels before her departure from Universal Music Group. Inspired by various changes in Lorde's personal life, including a breakup, moving to New York City, and a battle with an eating disorder, the album sought out to document a "femininity" that she felt wasn't present in modern art. It was preceded by the singles "What Was That", "Man of the Year", and "Hammer".

Produced by Lorde alongside Jim-E Stack, Virgin marks a return to electronic-based sounds of Lorde's first two albums following an indie folk pivot on 2021's Solar Power. The album is built around pulsating synthesizers, electronic keys, breakbeats, and distorted guitars. Critics noted an "industrial" feel to the production. Upon its release, it received acclaim from music critics, with praise aimed at the album's lyricism and Lorde's vocal performance, though some were more ambivalent to the album's production and melodies.

Commercially, Virgin charted in the top five in various countries, including the United States, and reached number one in Australia, Austria, New Zealand, Scotland and the United Kingdom, becoming Lorde's first album to top the UK Albums Chart. To support it, Lorde embarked on the Ultrasound World Tour, which began in September 2025 and concluded in October 2026.

== Background ==
Lorde released her third studio album, Solar Power, in August 2021 to polarising reviews from music critics and the public. In an email sent to fans via her newsletter subscription in 2022, the singer stated that the reception the album received was "really painful" and "confounding" to process at times, while further stating that she had learned a lot about her public image in the year since the album's release. In July 2022, at her show at Roundhouse in London, Lorde told the audience that she was getting closer to writing anthemic pop songs, stating that the "banger will always be on the horizon". The following year, Lorde told Ensemble that she had a "light on inside her" and that she wanted to "move as quick" as she can to release her next album, forgoing her usual long stretches of time in between her album releases.

In March 2023, Lorde was announced as the headliner for a series of festivals in Europe. During these festivals, the singer began performing reworked versions of songs from her discography, which included incorporating more electronic elements to Solar Power's original guitar-based melodies; she also performed two new songs, tentatively titled "Invisible Ink" and "Silver Moon" at Boardmasters Festival in the United Kingdom. She also performed at All Together Now in Ireland, Øyafestivalen in Norway, Flow Festival in Finland, Sziget Festival in Hungary, and Paredes de Coura Festival in Portugal. The performances for these festivals received widespread acclaim from critics. This string of performances was dubbed by Lorde as the "night vision edition" of the Solar Power Tour.

In an email sent to fans later that year, the singer stated that she was "living with heartbreak again", which publications interpreted to indicate a breakup with New Zealand music executive Justin Warren, a fact she confirmed in a profile interview with Rolling Stone. She also revealed health issues with her gut and skin. In April 2024, Lorde recorded a cover of "Take Me to the River"—originally written by American soul singer Al Green in 1974, but covered by American rock band Talking Heads in 1978—for the tribute album Everyone's Getting Involved: A Tribute to Talking Heads' Stop Making Sense (2024). In June 2024, Lorde was featured on a remix of "Girl, So Confusing" by English singer Charli XCX, taken from her studio album Brat (2024). In her verse, Lorde discussed her health and body image issues. The remix, included in Charli's remix album Brat and It's Completely Different but Also Still Brat (2024), received widespread critical praise, and featured on various year-end and mid-decade listicles, including the top placement by publications Exclaim!, The Independent, and Clash.

== Writing and production ==
Lorde co-produced the album alongside Jim-E Stack, with additional contributions from Dev Hynes, Dan Nigro, Fabiana Palladino, Andrew Aged and Buddy Ross. Spike Stent and Tom Elmhirst were enlisted for mixing of the record, while mastering was handled by Chris Gehringer. On parting ways with Jack Antonoff, who served as the main co-writer and producer on Melodrama and Solar Power, Lorde stated that she "just has to trust when [her] intuition says to keep moving", though she referred to Antonoff as a "positive, supportive collaborator".

Virgin has been described as a synth-pop, dance-pop, electropop, and art pop record that returns to Lorde's "signature" sound. The album incorporates a sample of the song "Morning Love" by Dexta Daps and an interpolation of the song "Suga Suga" by Baby Bash featuring Frankie J. In an interview with Billboard, Dexta Daps reacted to the sampling of his song: "My team was so excited, they didn't even reach out to me. They just accepted it! I mean, it’s Lorde! What's the sense of reaching out to me? I'm gonna say 'yes' anyways. I just recently heard the song, and, man, it is so beautiful."

== Title and artwork ==
The artwork, photographed by Heji Shin, depicts an X-ray image of a pelvis with a belt buckle, pant button, pant zipper, and IUD. Lorde said she viewed X-ray, MRI, and ultrasound as ways of capturing "techy but like mystical" images. In an announcement on her website, Lorde, who has synesthesia, stated that imagery of bathwater, ice, saliva and windows influenced her decision to have a transparent "colour" for the album, describing it as representing "full transparency". She further stated that Virgin was her attempt to "make a document" that reflected her femininity, which she described as "raw, primal, innocent, elegant, openhearted, spiritual, masc".

Lorde alluded to possible meanings of the title through screenshots shared on her Instagram. She shared it could represent a woman that is "not attached to a man, [...] that is one—in-herself", a result of combining Latin words from man (vir) and woman (gyne) relating 'virgin' to androgyny, or the word to purity as in 'virgin metals'. Lorde would state in an interview that she associates the title as not being representative of sexual purity, but to things that are essential and untainted.

The physical vinyl edition of the album features an image of Lorde's bare crotch through transparent pants photographed by Talia Chetrit. Alex Greenberger of ARTnews wrote that the image "speaks to Virgin's broader concerns with how much one is meant to reveal of their inner self, specifically when it comes to gender", adding that it also "points up a contradiction: though Lorde has left little of her torso to the imagination, we still can't see aspects of her gender identity." The vinyl edition of the album was sold with a parental advisory warning for adult imagery.

== Promotion ==
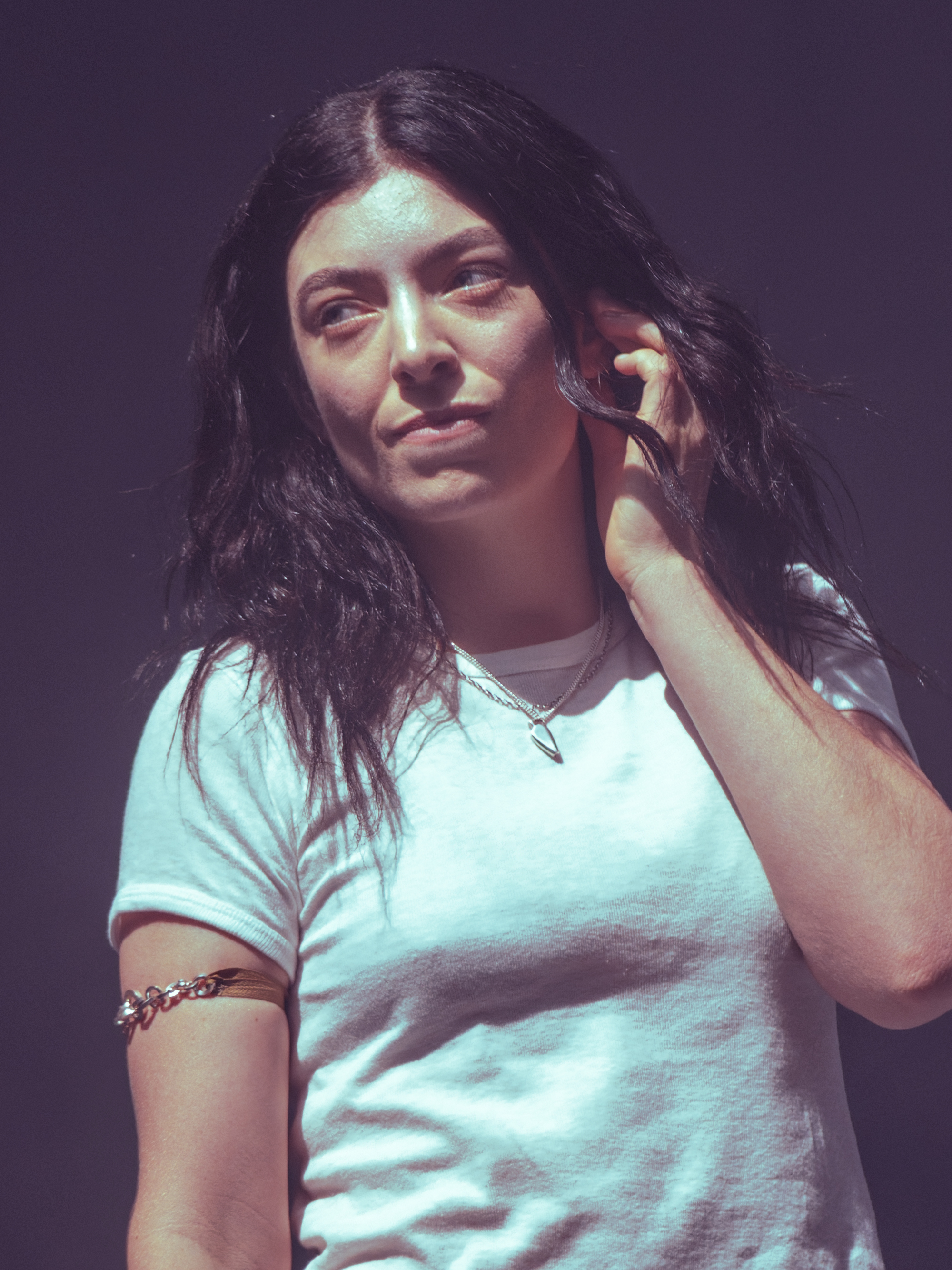
Lorde at the Glastonbury Festival 2025, where she performed the full album unannounced

On 24 April 2025, Lorde released "What Was That", her first original single release as a solo artist in nearly four years. The song acted as the lead single from her then-unannounced fourth album. An accompanying music video was filmed in New York City, and included footage of a surprise performance at Washington Square Park earlier that week. The Washington Square Park event attracted media attention after it was initially shut down by the NYPD due to overcrowding and a lack of permits required for hosting a public concert in New York City. She announced the 11-track album on 30 April and revealed further information through her social media, detailing the release and contributors.

Lorde announced the album's track listing on 28 May. The following day, "Man of the Year" was released as the album's second single, alongside an accompanying music video. On 18 June, Lorde posted a video captioned "Virgin in ten days another song in a few". The following day, the album's third single, "Hammer", was announced. On 22 June, five days before the album's release, Lorde debuted the album for fans in the Brooklyn bar Baby's All Right in an event live-streamed on TikTok. The album's marketing style has been likened to guerrilla marketing strategies, consisting of frequent pop-up events in unconventional venues in various cities, including Auckland, Sydney, London, and New York City.

Lorde performed the album in full on its release day in an unannounced performance at Glastonbury Festival 2025.

Shortly after release, fans reported that the clear CD physical edition, which featured a fully transparent disc, did not work in some systems, including car stereos, portable CD players, game consoles, CD recorders, multi-disc changers, slot-loading players, and older players.

In June 2026, to mark the album's first anniversary, Lorde released 49 demos from the album under the name Xrays. Alongside the release, in a newsletter, she said that she had considered "making an album worth of these skeleton versions, cool composites of a few different versions" but decided that releasing the demos was "realer, funnier, more revealing of crookedness and slant".

=== Tour ===
On 8 May 2025, Lorde announced the Ultrasound World Tour in support of Virgin. The tour began on 17 September 2025 in Austin, Texas.

== Critical reception ==
Professional ratings
Aggregate scores
| Source | Rating |
|---|---|
| AnyDecentMusic? | 7.9/10 |
| Metacritic | 82/100 |
Review scores
| Source | Rating |
| AllMusic | 4.5/5 stars |
| The A.V. Club | A |
| Clash | 9/10 |
| Consequence | B− |
| The Guardian | 4/5 stars |
| The Independent | 3/5 stars |
| NME | 4/5 stars |
| Paste | 8.5/10 |
| Pitchfork | 7.6/10 |
| Rolling Stone | 4.5/5 stars |

Upon its release, Virgin was met with acclaim from music critics. According to the review aggregator Metacritic, Virgin received "universal acclaim" based on a weighted average score of 82 out of 100 from 20 critic scores. The review aggregator site AnyDecentMusic? compiled 20 reviews and gave the album an average of 7.9 out of 10, based on their assessment of the critical consensus.

Olivia Horn of Pitchfork wrote that while the album is "rooted somewhat in [Lorde's] past, it's a gritty, tender, and often transcendent ode to freedom and transformation", adding that "the whole thing is pregnant with possibility, blissfully abstract, ripe for interpretation. It feels like a portal to anywhere you want to go." Maya Georgi of Rolling Stone wrote that Lorde "redefines who she wants to be on her most introspective record yet", adding that she "isn't trying to capture something from the past, but instead leans into the chaos of reinvention." Jem Aswad of Variety praised the "electronics-dominated" production, which "matches the lyrics perfectly, rising and receding with the emotions, pulling back or piling on for impact." The Guardian's Alexis Petridis wrote that "the sound of Virgin is noticeably unsettled and rough", and added that Lorde's songwriting remains as "skilful and incisive" as it was on Pure Heroine (2013). The Skinny's Rhys Morgan praised Lorde's songwriting and wrote: "While it may not break entirely new ground, this album's embrace of mordant textures and restrained warmth ... cements it as consistently compelling and quietly brilliant."

In a mixed review, Paolo Ragusa of Consequence wrote that "the challenge of Virgin, especially given its brevity, is that it fails to leave a strong impression" because "even with Lorde's vocal conviction, the melodies often lack stickiness and tend to meander." NME's Alex Rigotti thought that "sonically, Lorde takes some big swings without losing sight of who she is" on the album, although "there are moments where the production feels slightly misjudged." The Arts Desk's James Mellen wrote: "Highlights are in the more upbeat and up-tempo tracks, but aside from 'What Was That' nothing reaches real-deal classic pop single territory. Virgin is a solid effort, but mainly it's all mellow and no drama."

=== Year-end rankings ===
| Publication/critic | List | Rank | Ref. |
|---|---|---|---|
| Billboard | The 50 Best Albums of 2025 | 14 | |
| Cosmopolitan | The Best Albums of 2025 | —N/a | |
| Dazed | The 20 Best Albums of 2025 | 10 | |
| Double J | The 50 Best Albums of 2025 | 49 | |
| Elle | The Best Albums of 2025 | —N/a | |
| NME | The 50 Best Albums of 2025 | 24 | |
| Rolling Stone | The 100 Best Albums of 2025 | 30 | |
| Slant | The 50 Best Albums of 2025 | 22 | |
| Stereogum | The 50 Best Albums of 2025 | 23 | |
| Vogue | The 45 Best Albums of 2025 | —N/a | |

== Commercial performance ==
In Lorde's home country, New Zealand, Virgin debuted at number one on the Official Top 40 Albums chart, marking her fourth consecutive number one album. Furthermore, the album also debuted at number one in Australia on the ARIA Top 50 Albums chart, thus earning Lorde her fourth consecutive number one album in both countries.

In the United States, Virgin debuted at number two on the Billboard 200, with first week sales of 71,000 album equivalent-units. Of that sum, 42,000 were from pure album sales, which consisted of 31,000 vinyl sales, earning Lorde her largest sales week since her 2017 studio album Melodrama, as well as her largest week on vinyl ever.

In the United Kingdom, Virgin debuted at number one on the UK Albums Chart, moving 18,848 units in its first week, consisting of 12,411 pure sales and 6,437 streaming-equivalent units. The album became Lorde's first number one album in the United Kingdom, and earned her highest first week sales in the country, beating Pure Heroine (2013) by 550 copies. Additionally, three songs from the album charted on the UK Singles Chart top 75 during the album's release week: "Shapeshifter", "Hammer" and "What Was That", reaching numbers 44, 66 and 35, respectively.

== Track listing ==
Virgin track listing
| No. | Title | Writer(s) | Producer(s) | Length |
|---|---|---|---|---|
| 1. | "Hammer" | Ella Marija Lani Yelich-O'Connor; James Harmon Stack | Lorde; Jim-E Stack; Buddy Ross^{[a]} | 3:13 |
| 2. | "What Was That" | Yelich-O'Connor; Stack | Lorde; Stack; Daniel Nigro | 3:29 |
| 3. | "Shapeshifter" | Yelich-O'Connor; Stack; Andrew Aged | Lorde; Stack | 4:17 |
| 4. | "Man of the Year" | Yelich-O'Connor; Stack | Lorde; Stack | 3:00 |
| 5. | "Favourite Daughter" | Yelich-O'Connor; Stack | Lorde; Stack | 3:28 |
| 6. | "Current Affairs" | Yelich-O'Connor; Fabiana Palladino; Louis Anthony Grandison; Craig Harrisingh; David Harrisingh | Lorde; Stack | 3:18 |
| 7. | "Clearblue" | Yelich-O'Connor; Stack | Lorde; Stack | 1:57 |
| 8. | "GRWM" | Yelich-O'Connor; Stack | Lorde; Stack; Ross | 2:35 |
| 9. | "Broken Glass" | Yelich-O'Connor; Stack; Nigro | Lorde; Stack; Nigro^{[a]} | 3:14 |
| 10. | "If She Could See Me Now" | Yelich-O'Connor; Palladino; Stack; William DiSerafino; Ronald Ray Bryant; Francisco Javier Bautista Jr.; Nathan Perez | Lorde; Stack; Sachi DiSerafino^{[a]} | 2:56 |
| 11. | "David" | Yelich-O'Connor; Stack | Lorde; Stack | 3:24 |
| Total length: | | | | 34:51 |

=== Notes ===
- ^{^[a]} signifies an additional producer
- "Current Affairs" contains a sample of "Morning Love", written by Louis Anthony Grandison, Craig Harrisingh, David Harrisingh, and performed by Dexta Daps.
- "If She Could See Me Now" contains an interpolation of "Suga Suga", written and performed by Baby Bash and Frankie J.

== Personnel ==
Credits were adapted from the album's liner notes.

=== Vocals and instruments ===
- Ella Marija Lani Yelich-O'Connor – vocals (all tracks), wind chime (track 11)
- Jim-E Stack – keyboards (1–5, 7–11), synthesizer (1–6, 8–11), drum programming (1–6, 8–10), OP-1 (2, 3, 6, 11), piano (2, 3, 8, 9), bass guitar (2, 3, 4, 6), programming (5, 7, 11), drums (2), glockenspiel (3), drum machine (5), electric guitar (6), space echo (9), Wurlitzer (11)
- Daniel Nigro – synthesizer, bass guitar, electric guitar (2, 9); piano (2)
- Dev Hynes – bass guitar, cello (4); electric guitar, synthesizer (5)
- Justin Vernon – electric guitar, bass guitar (11)
- Andrew Aged – electric guitar (2, 3, 5, 6, 9, 10)
- Buddy Ross – synthesizer (1, 8, 10); keyboards, piano (1); drum programming (8)
- Eli Teplin – piano (4, 5), keyboards (4), synthesizer (5)
- Devin Hoffman – acoustic guitar, electric guitar, bass guitar (9)
- Rob Moose – viola, violin (3)
- Gabriel Cabezas – cello (3)
- Craig Weinrib – drums (3)
- Kyle Crane – drums (10)

=== Technical ===
- Jim-E Stack – recording (all tracks), mixing (7)
- Ian Gold – recording
- Jack Manning – recording
- Fabiana Palladino – recording
- Daniel Nigro – recording
- Devin Hoffman – recording
- Austin Christy – recording assistance
- Koby Berman – recording assistance
- Bailey Kisiak – recording assistance
- Kyle Parker Smith – recording assistance
- Buddy Ross – additional recording
- Rob Moose – strings recording (all tracks), string arrangement (3)
- Mark "Spike" Stent – mixing (1–3, 5, 8–11)
- Tom Elmhirst – mixing (4, 6)
- Matt Wolach – mixing assistance (1–3, 5, 8–11)
- Kieran Beardmore – mixing assistance (1–3, 5, 8–11)
- Chris Gehringer – mastering
- Will Quinnell – mastering assistance

=== Visuals ===
- Eric Wrenn – album art direction, design
- Heji Shin – front and back cover art
- Talia Chetrit – inside photography
- Lorde – project creative direction
- Thistle Brown – project creative direction

== Charts ==
=== Weekly charts ===
Weekly chart performance for Virgin
| Chart (2025) | Peak position |
|---|---|
| Australian Albums (ARIA) | 1 |
| Austrian Albums (Ö3 Austria) | 1 |
| Belgian Albums (Ultratop Flanders) | 1 |
| Belgian Albums (Ultratop Wallonia) | 12 |
| Canadian Albums (Billboard) | 3 |
| Croatian International Albums (HDU) | 9 |
| Danish Albums (Hitlisten) | 12 |
| Dutch Albums (Album Top 100) | 2 |
| Finnish Albums (Suomen virallinen lista) | 20 |
| French Albums (SNEP) | 26 |
| German Albums (Offizielle Top 100) | 3 |
| Greek Albums (IFPI) | 23 |
| Hungarian Albums (MAHASZ) | 21 |
| Icelandic Albums (Tónlistinn) | 15 |
| Irish Albums (Official Charts) | 3 |
| Italian Albums (FIMI) | 36 |
| Lithuanian Albums (AGATA) | 17 |
| New Zealand Albums (RMNZ) | 1 |
| Norwegian Albums (IFPI Norge) | 22 |
| Polish Albums (ZPAV) | 11 |
| Portuguese Albums (AFP) | 2 |
| Scottish Albums (Official Charts) | 1 |
| Spanish Albums (PROMUSICAE) | 13 |
| Swedish Albums (Sverigetopplistan) | 14 |
| Swiss Albums (Schweizer Hitparade) | 3 |
| UK Albums (Official Charts) | 1 |
| US Billboard 200 | 2 |
| US Top Rock & Alternative Albums (Billboard) | 1 |

=== Year-end charts ===
Year-end chart performance for Virgin
| Chart (2025) | Position |
|---|---|
| Australian Albums (ARIA) | 62 |
| Belgian Albums (Ultratop Flanders) | 176 |
| New Zealand Albums (RMNZ) | 25 |

== Certifications ==
| Region | Certification | Certified units/sales |
|---|---|---|
| New Zealand (RMNZ) | Gold | 7,500^{‡} |
| United Kingdom (BPI) | Silver | 60,000^{‡} |
^{‡} Sales+streaming figures based on certification alone.

== Release history ==
Release dates and formats
| Region | Date | Format(s) | Label | Ref. |
|---|---|---|---|---|
| Various | 27 June 2025 | CD; LP; digital download; streaming | Universal New Zealand | |

== See also ==
- List of 2025 albums
- List of number-one albums from the 2020s (New Zealand)
- List of number-one albums of 2025 (Australia)
- List of UK Albums Chart number ones of the 2020s
