= My Side =

My Side may refer to:

- "My Side", a song on Care Package by Canadian artist Drake
- My Side, the autobiography of footballer David Beckham
