= Jai Paul =

British-Indian musician (born 1988)

- Born: 30 June 1988 (age 38)
- Origin: Rayners Lane, London, England
- Genres: Electronic; R&B; pop
- Occupations: Singer; songwriter; record producer
- Instruments: Vocals; guitar; drums; synthesizers; triangle
- Years active: 2007–present
- Labels: XL; Paul Institute
- Website: jai-paul.com

Jai Paul (born 30 June 1988) is a British songwriter, record producer and recording artist. His early demo "BTSTU" led to his online discovery and a subsequent recording contract with XL Recordings. Together with its follow-up "Jasmine", these songs have been regarded as influential on underground as well as mainstream pop music in the 2010s.

A demo album consisting of songs for his aborted debut album Bait Ones was leaked in 2013 and unofficially uploaded by an unknown source to the surprise and acclaim of critics, leading to Paul taking an extended hiatus from music. Paul returned in 2019 with the official release of his leaked album and a new double single entitled "Do You Love Her Now / He". In 2023, at Coachella, he performed live for the first time in his career.

== Early life ==
Paul is from Rayners Lane in Harrow, northwest London, England. He is of Indian descent. In his one-and-only interview to date, Paul said that "music to me was just a hobby and, in a way, I didn't care about showing it to anyone". He grew up listening to the Beatles, the Electric Light Orchestra, Queen and Michael Jackson and has been influenced by Björk. His elder brother A. K. Paul is also a record producer, musician and songwriter.

== Career ==
=== 2007–2013: "BTSTU" and "Jasmine" ===
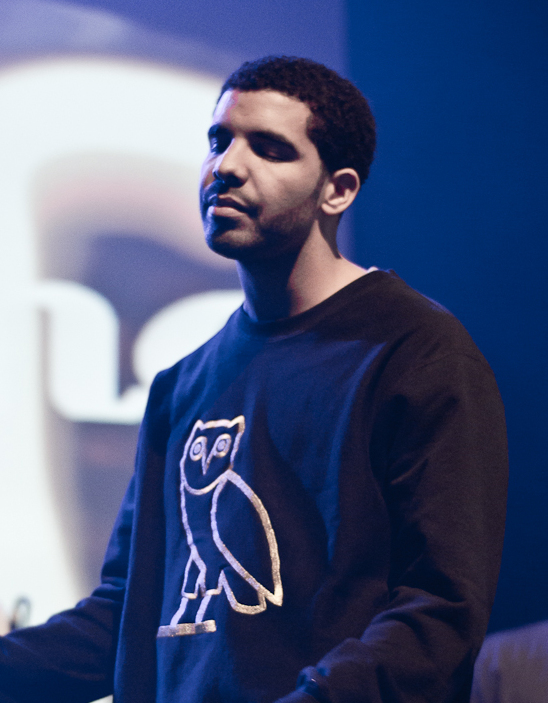
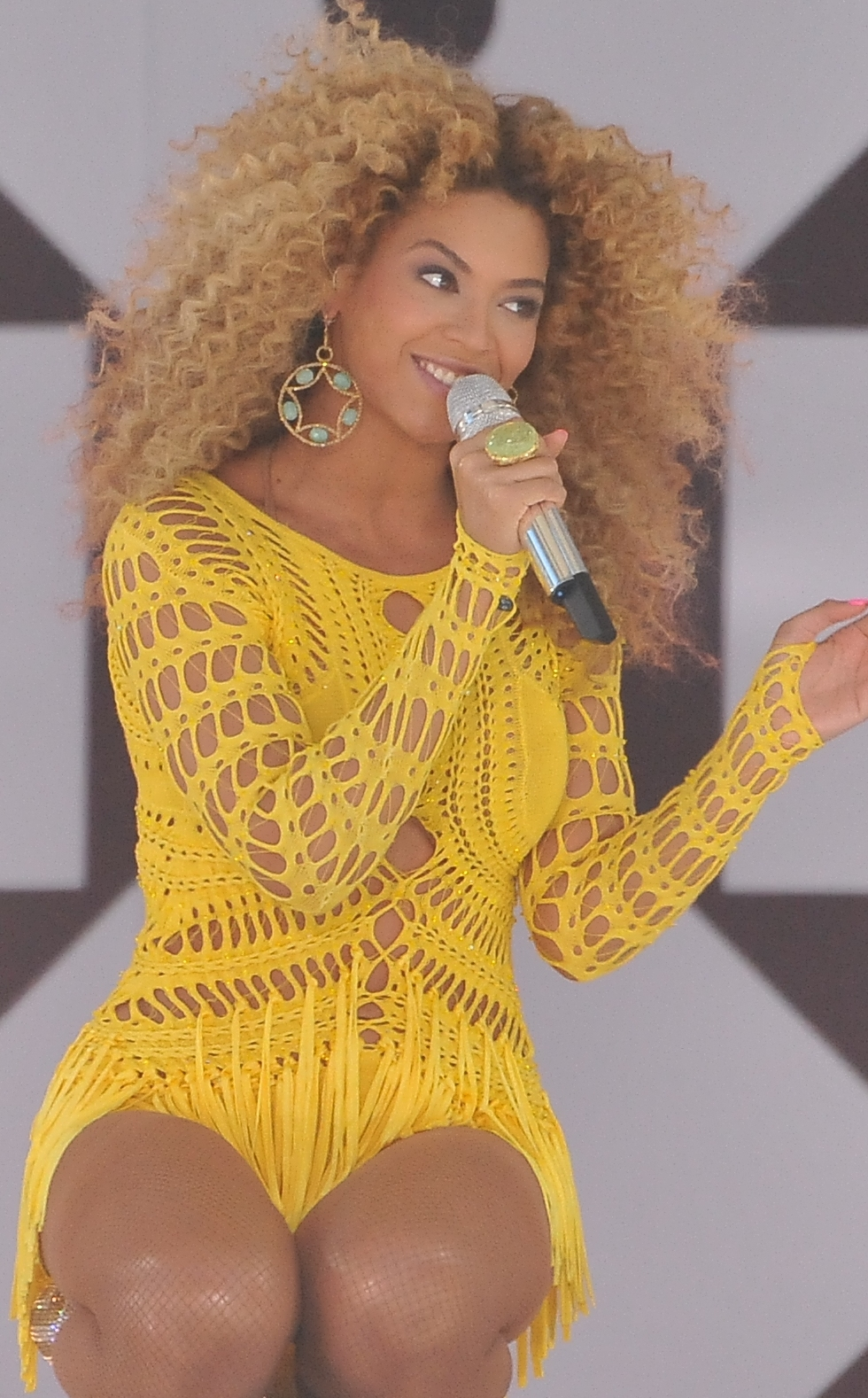
Paul's "BTSTU" was sampled by both Drake (left) and Beyoncé (right) in 2011.

Paul's 2007 demo recording "BTSTU", hosted at his MySpace page, received widespread music blog coverage throughout 2010, including a feature in Guardian's New band of the week, resulting in UK national radio play. International music press followed blog coverage of the track (with some publications shortening the song's title to "BTSU"). The song caught the attention of several record companies, Polydor mentioned among them, and a bidding war ensued, with Paul eventually signing with XL Recordings later that year. By December 2010, the BBC had long-listed Paul for their Sound of 2011 poll, asserting his style as "a startlingly fresh vision of 21st century pop music".

On 21 April 2011, XL Recordings officially released Paul's the reworked "BTSTU (Edit)" to acclaim, with the BBC's Zane Lowe commenting that "Jai (pronounced Jay) Paul is part Dilla / part D'Angelo but also full of individuality. An exciting prospect on the horizon".

On 20 May 2011, Canadian hip-hop artist Drake "officially leaked" a track titled "Dreams Money Can Buy" via his blog, October's Very Own. The track features a sample of Paul's "BTSTU" prominently. According to Alex Frank of The Fader, the song "End of Time" by American R&B artist Beyoncé contains the "same Jai Paul sample from Drake's new song, only sped up".

On 30 March 2012, Paul uploaded a new demo titled "Jasmine (demo)" to his official SoundCloud page, subsequently receiving an official release via XL on 9 April 2012. "Jasmine (demo)" received positive reviews, with Pitchfork featuring the song as a "Best New Track", The New York Times praising its "Prince era sensuality" and The Guardian describing the production as "amazing".

Later in 2012, Paul appeared as a guest on the deluxe version of Big Boi's 2012 album Vicious Lies and Dangerous Rumors, having produced the track "Higher Res". Paul also performed on the track alongside Big Boi and Little Dragon.

=== 2013–2016: Leaked material, hiatus from music ===
On 14 April 2013, an unknown user uploaded a number of untitled tracks to Bandcamp, a music streaming and purchasing service that caters mainly for independent artists. These untitled tracks were made available for sale as an album. Bandcamp is known for being vulnerable to scams and copyright infringement, with Consequence of Sound reporting in a feature that "Its response time to infractions is slow, and its built-in protections against scams appear minimal". However, hours after the page's appearance, music press picked up on it and publicised it extensively, reporting the music as belonging to Paul and describing it as constituting his debut album, as well as including links to download the material in articles. Paul and his record label denied having released the recordings, or authorising their release.

Owen Myers reported the music as having come from a personal laptop stolen from Paul himself, citing a comment made by Twitter user "@FatAmpNadia" as his source. Major music press followed Myers' lead, and the stolen laptop story was universally reported. It is unclear how "@FatAmpNadia" was involved.

Many journalists and commenters suggested the leak to be a cynically devised marketing plan on Paul and XL Recordings' behalf; having achieved the desired result, the two parties made false statements to the public "explaining away" the events. Others conjectured that Paul did in fact upload the tracks himself, in an attempt to illegally leak and sell his music independently from record label XL Recordings and publisher BMG, seeing parallels with distinct situations involving unrelated artists. Duncan Cooper of The Fader concludes that "In any case, the album's origins and officialness [sic] seem like something of a technicality", adding the opinion that "Jai Paul seems to be getting paid for it", despite the record company's claims otherwise.

Many publications opted to review the leaked material as an "album" with Gigwise commenting "there are moments that sound distinctly unfinished. There are periods of silence at the end of most tracks, there're only a few smooth segues between the skits and the tracks, and there are periods where the mixing of the vocal track sounds downright bad. The whole album doesn't feel as precisely balanced as you would expect from Jai Paul".

Despite being an unofficial release, the "album" was ranked in year-end lists, at number 32 in the music blog Pretty Much Amazing's "40 Best Albums of 2013", number 28 in The Guardian's "Best Albums of 2013", and number 20 in Pitchfork's "Top 50 Albums of 2013". In August 2014, Pitchfork recognised the leak in its "The 100 Best Albums of the Decade So Far" list. Also in 2013, "Jasmine" was featured in the video game Grand Theft Auto V on the in-game radio station Radio Mirror Park. Formal release of the leaked material, Leak 04-13 (Bait Ones) (2019), was ranked number 95 in the publication's 200 Best albums of the 2010s.

=== 2016–2019: Paul Institute ===
In March 2016, both Jai and A. K. Paul created a record label named "Paul Institute". The project was inaugurated with the release of A. K. Paul's debut single as a solo artist, "Landcruisin'". The song, having been debuted on Zane Lowe's Beats 1 radio show, was available initially only to Paul Institute members who signed up via the Institute's website and SMS messages. Digital and physical copies of the record were purchasable via the site.

In November 2017, Jai was pictured for the first time since 2013 in Property Week, in which himself and A. K. Paul had signed a lease in London's White City Place for a space for the Paul Institute. Later that month, Paul Institute released two new singles; "Mystery" by Fabiana Palladino, with production credits to Jai Paul, and "Evil" by Ruthven, with production credits to A. K. Paul.

On 25 July 2018, The Institute released two new singles: the track "Shimmer" by Fabiana Palladino featuring Jai Paul on production, engineering, instrumental and mixing duties; and "Hypothalamus", Ruthven's second release on the Paul Institute imprint, featuring A. K. Paul on guitar.

=== 2019–present: Return from hiatus and release of leaked material ===
In 2019, the leak was made official and digitally available as "Leak 04-13 (Bait Ones)" to his website and streaming services. The download included a long letter by Paul where he writes about how the album was potentially leaked: "I don't really know. I believe these particular versions of tracks may have come from a burned CD that got misplaced - a fair amount of people would have had access to my music in various forms between 2010 and 2013". In the same letter, Paul also addresses the speculation about leaking the music himself: "I was also frustrated by how all this was being framed online, leading to the widespread belief that I had decided to leak my own music, despite my record label and I saying otherwise. It didn't fit at all with anything I had done previously in style or attitude, and especially not in presentation".

He also released two new tracks; "He" and "Do You Love Her Now" as a double B-side. This marked Paul's return from a hiatus of more than seven years after the release of his last single, "Jasmine". Paul provided miscellaneous production to Childish Gambino's track "Time" featuring Ariana Grande on the album 3.15.20, released in March 2020.

On 20 April 2021, Paul posted on Twitter and Instagram in honor of the ten year anniversary of his first single, "BTSTU". In his posts he linked fans to a new site, a recreation of his old MySpace account, the platform he originally released music on. The site featured some unreleased demo and promotional material, as well as Easter egg content that linked to videos and websites.

In 2022, Paul made a brief appearance in the third season of the television series Atlanta, conversing with LaKeith Stanfield's character, Darius, at a party.

On 10 January 2023, Paul was announced as part of the Coachella lineup, and his debut performance was on Mojave Stage, on Saturday 15 April 2023. Paul's band included A. K. Paul, on guitar, Paul Institute's Fabiana Palladino on keyboards and backing vocals, Rocco Palladino on bass, Isaac Kizito on drums and was musically directed by Avi Barath. Paul and the band subsequently played two headlining nights in both New York City and London. In September, Paul announced his debut shows in Australia, France and Germany, alongside shows in Los Angeles and San Francisco. In November of the same year, both Paul and Fabiana Palladino released a collaborative track titled "I Care" that had been teased during the Coachella performance. In the same month, XL Recordings announced a physical release of Leak 04-13 (Bait Ones), with the album becoming available on vinyl.

== Relationship with media and industry ==
Music media has speculated about Paul's background, motivation and intent as he has remained out of the public eye; further, his professional music career has not followed convention thus far. English publication Clash noted Paul's distinctiveness early on, saying in 2011: "Hype is a fascinating commodity. Where some quickly melt down the attention for liquid purpose, promising talent Jai Paul removed all his music from MySpace and went to get his shit together". XL Recordings founder and owner Richard Russell accepts Paul's idiosyncratic style, saying: "Jai is a wizard... the way he's going about things is, I think for many, baffling. He's going about things in the most Jai Paul way you could possibly go about things. And who knows where that may lead."

The Guardian writer Michael Cragg, having met Paul in 2011, observed that Paul's enigma "seems genuinely uncontrived – Jai just doesn't seem into the idea of rushing or teasing new material if it isn't ready." In a separate piece for i-D, Cragg went on to say: "there was something incredibly charming about his confusion as to why anyone would want to talk to him. Weirdly, he was under the impression he could just release music for people to enjoy and that would be that." Pitchfork's Lindsay Zoladz suggested that Paul may be "perhaps more burdened by his talent than inclined to show it off." Meanwhile, The Quietus blogger Alex Macpherson disagreed, presuming the opposite; saying in 2013 that Paul's "career to date [consists] of little more than a couple of shonky demos and a carefully cultivated aura of mystique" in an article titled "Jai Paul: A Scam to Feed the Internet Sausage Machine".

In 2016, Rolling Stone magazine asked singer Nao (who has collaborated with A. K. Paul) whether the Paul brothers' image was intentionally "mysterious". She answered in the negative, saying: "They're not tapped into the industry in that way and I don't know if they give a shit." She added: "They're normal guys that are trying to find their own route without playing the game."

== Discography ==
=== Albums ===
- Leak 04-13 (Bait Ones) (2019)

=== Singles ===
Title	Year	Peak chart positions	Album
Title	Year	UK	Album
"BTSTU" (edit)	2011	139	Leak 04-13 (Bait Ones)
"Jasmine" (demo)	2012	—	Leak 04-13 (Bait Ones)
"Do You Love Her Now"	2019	—	Non-album singles
"He"	2019	—	Non-album singles
"—" denotes a recording that did not chart or was not released in that territory.

=== Featured singles ===
Title	Year	Other artist(s)	Album
"I Care"	2023	Fabiana Palladino	Fabiana Palladino

=== Guest appearances ===
List of non-single guest appearances, with other performing artists, showing year released and album name
Title	Year	Other artist(s)	Album
"Higher Res"	2012	Big Boi, Little Dragon	Vicious Lies and Dangerous Rumors

=== Songwriting and production credits ===
Title	Year	Artist	Album	Credit
"Magic"	2008	ProDot	No Face Just Music	Production
"Dreams Money Can Buy"	2011	Drake	Care Package	Songwriting
"End of Time"	2011	Beyoncé	4	Uncredited songwriting
"Higher Res"	2012	Big Boi, Little Dragon	Vicious Lies and Dangerous Rumors	Songwriting/Production
"Mystery"	2017	Fabiana Palladino	—N/a	Production
"Shimmer"	2018	Fabiana Palladino	—N/a	Additional production
"Time"	2020	Childish Gambino, Ariana Grande	3.15.20	Miscellaneous production
"Waiting"	2020	Fabiana Palladino	Paul Institute - Summer 2020	Mixing, Additional production
"Closer"	2024	Fabiana Palladino	Fabiana Palladino	Drum programming
"Can You Look in the Mirror?"	2024	Fabiana Palladino	Fabiana Palladino	Drum programming, synthesizer programming
"I Can't Dream Anymore"	2024	Fabiana Palladino	Fabiana Palladino	Drum programming, guitar, synthesizers
"Give Me A Sign"	2024	Fabiana Palladino	Fabiana Palladino	Guitar
"I Care"	2024	Fabiana Palladino	Fabiana Palladino	Drum programming, guitar, synthesizers, vocals, percussion
"Stay with Me Through the Night"	2024	Fabiana Palladino	Fabiana Palladino	Synthesizers, drum machine, cowbell, handclaps
"In the Fire"	2024	Fabiana Palladino	Fabiana Palladino	Drum programming, guitar, synthesizers, synth bass
