= Care Package (album) =

Compilation album by Drake
- Released: August 2, 2019
- Recorded: 2010–2016
- Genres: Hip-hop; R&B
- Length: 73:37
- Label: OVO
- Producers: Noah "40" Shebib; Allen Ritter; Boi-1da; Ducko McFli; J.U.S.T.I.C.E. League; Nikhil Seetharam; PartyNextDoor; Sampha; Syk Sense; T-Minus; Vinylz

Drake chronology
The Best in the World Pack (2019)	Care Package (2019)	Dark Lane Demo Tapes (2020)

Care Package is the first compilation album by Canadian rapper Drake. It was released on August 2, 2019, by OVO Sound. The compilation consists of songs released between 2010 and 2016 that were initially unavailable for purchase or commercial streaming. The compilation features guest appearances from J. Cole, Rick Ross, and James Fauntleroy and additional vocals by Sampha and Beyoncé.

== Background and release ==
Care Package follows the re-release of Drake's mixtape So Far Gone onto streaming services in February 2019. On August 1, 2019, Drake announced the release of Care Package via Instagram. The release of Care Package coincided with the start of Drake's ninth annual OVO Fest in Toronto.

The songs on Care Package were released as promotional material for several albums throughout the years. The earliest tracks, "I Get Lonely" and "Paris Morton Music", were released in 2010 after the release of Drake's debut album Thank Me Later. "Dreams Money Can Buy", "Trust Issues", "Club Paradise" and "Free Spirit" were released in 2011 before the release of Drake's second studio album, Take Care. The songs "5AM in Toronto", "Girls Love Beyoncé" and "Jodeci Freestyle" were released in 2013 before the release of Drake's third studio album, Nothing Was the Same. "The Motion" was included as a bonus track on the Best Buy exclusive physical deluxe edition and international edition for Nothing Was the Same.

"Draft Day" and "Days in the East" were released via October Very Own's SoundCloud in April 2014. "Heat of the Moment" was leaked online alongside "How About Now" and "6 God" in 2014. "How About Now" and "My Side" were included as bonus tracks on the physical edition to the mixtape If You're Reading This It's Too Late. "Can I" featuring vocals by Beyoncé was leaked online in 2015. "4PM in Calabasas" was premiered on OVO Sound Radio in June 2016, and is the latest track recorded on the album.

== Critical reception ==
Professional ratings
Aggregate scores
Source	Rating
Metacritic	77/100
Review scores
Source	Rating
AllMusic	4/5 stars
The Edge	4/5 stars
Highsnobiety	4.5/5
The Independent	3/5 stars
Pitchfork	8.1/10
Rolling Stone	3.5/5 stars

Care Package received positive reviews from critics. At Metacritic, which assigns a normalized rating out of 100 to reviews from mainstream publications, the album received an average score of 77, based on 5 reviews. Roisin O'Connor of The Independent noted the difference in lyrical content from the compiled songs and Drake's contemporary releases, as well as "a darker, moodier vibe running across the record in contrast to the scattered eclecticism of 2018's Scorpion."

== Commercial performance ==
Care Package debuted at number one on the US Billboard 200 with 109,000 album-equivalent units, of which 16,000 were album sales. This gave Drake his ninth US number-one album. It was displaced by Slipknot's We Are Not Your Kind one week later. The album also debuted at number one on the Canadian Albums Chart, earning 10,000 album-equivalent units and becoming Drake's ninth Canadian number-one album.

== Track listing ==
Credits adapted from Tidal and YouTube Music.

No.	Title	Writer(s)	Producer(s)	Length
1.	"Dreams Money Can Buy"	Aubrey Graham; Noah Shebib; Jai Paul	Noah "40" Shebib	4:13
2.	"The Motion"	Graham; Shebib; Sampha Sisay	Sampha; 40	4:00
3.	"How Bout Now"	Graham; Matthew Samuels; Jordan Evans; Donald DeGrate Jr.; Cedric Hailey	Boi-1da; Evans^{[a]}	3:55
4.	"Trust Issues"	Graham; Shebib; Tyler Williams; Nikhil Seetharam; Dwayne Carter; Khaled Khaled; William Roberts	40; T-Minus; Seetharam	4:41
5.	"Days in the East"	Graham; Shebib; Jahron Braithwaite; Mikky Ekko; Justin Parker; Elgin Lumpkin; Timothy Mosley; Robert Reives	PartyNextDoor; 40	5:53
6.	"Draft Day"	Graham; Samuels; Charles Singleton; Joshua Scruggs; Lauryn Hill	Boi-1da; Ducko McFli; Syk Sense	4:26
7.	"4PM in Calabasas"	Graham; Anderson Hernandez; Adam Feeney; Allen Ritter; Clifton Chase; Edward Fletcher; Melvin Glover; Greg Prestopino; Sylvia Robinson; Matthew Wilder; Brian Morgan; Oliver Scott; Ric Wilson	Vinylz; Frank Dukes; Ritter^{[a]}	4:00
8.	"5AM in Toronto"	Graham; Samuels; Hernandez; Ritter; Seetharam; Bobbie Gentry	Boi-1da; Vinylz; Ritter^{[a]}; Seetharam^{[a]}	3:25
9.	"I Get Lonely"	Graham; Shebib; Dallas Austin	40	4:13
10.	"My Side"	Graham; Shebib; Noel Cadastre; Samuels; Brathwaite	40; Cadastre; Boi-1da^{[a]}	4:54
11.	"Jodeci Freestyle" (featuring J. Cole)	Graham; Shebib; Roosevelt Harrell III; Jermaine Cole; DeGrate Jr.; Roger Troutman; Thomas Troutman; Andreao Heard; James Lloyd; Jeff Lorber; Christopher Wallace	Bink!; 40^{[a]}	4:14
12.	"Club Paradise"	Graham; Shebib	40	4:43
13.	"Free Spirit" (featuring Rick Ross)	Graham; Shebib; Roberts; Stuart Matthewman; Sade Adu	40	4:12
14.	"Heat of the Moment"	Graham; Shebib; Myron Avant; Stephen Huff	40	5:43
15.	"Girls Love Beyoncé" (featuring James Fauntleroy)	Graham; Shebib; James Fauntleroy; Wade Brown; LaShawn Daniels; Fred Jerkins III; Rodney Jerkins; Beyoncé Knowles; LeToya Luckett; LaTavia Roberson; Kelly Rowland	40	3:45
16.	"Paris Morton Music"	Graham; Shebib; Kevin Crowe; Erik Oritz; Chrisette Payne; Roberts	J.U.S.T.I.C.E. League	4:11
17.	"Can I"	Graham; Shebib; Knowles; Johnny Marr	40	3:09
Total length:				73:37

Notes

- There is a remix of "Draft Day" featuring vocals from Sky Blu of LMFAO.
- ^{^[a]} signifies a co-producer
- "The Motion" features background vocals by Sampha
- "4PM in Calabasas" features uncredited vocals by Frank Dukes.
- "Club Paradise" contains background vocals from Abel Makkonen Tesfaye
- "Heat of the Moment" features uncredited vocals by PartyNextDoor
- "Girls Love Beyoncé" features background vocals by Wade O. Brown
- "Can I" features additional vocals by Beyoncé

Samples

- "Dreams Money Can Buy" contains a sample of "BTSTU (Demo)", written and performed by Jai Paul.
- "How Bout Now" contains a sample of "My Heart Belongs to U", written by Donald DeGrate, and Cedric Hailey, as performed by Jodeci.
- "Trust Issues" contains an interpolation of "I'm on One", written by Aubrey Graham, Noah Shebib, Tyler Williams, Dwayne Carter, Khaled Khaled, William Roberts and Nikhil Seetharam, as performed by DJ Khaled.
- "Days in the East" contains a sample of "Stay", written by Mikky Ekko, Justin Parker and Elof Loelv, as performed by Rihanna.
- "Draft Day" contains a sample of "Doo Wop (That Thing)", written and performed by Lauryn Hill.
- "4PM in Calabasas" contains a sample of "You're a Customer", as performed by EPMD, and an interpolation of "Can't Nobody Hold Me Down", written by Clifton Chase, Edward Fletcher, Melvin Glover, Greg Prestopino, Sylvia Robinson and Matthew Wilder, as performed by Puff Daddy.
- "5AM in Toronto" contains a sample of "Ode to Billie Joe", written by Bobbie Gentry, as performed by Lou Donaldson.
- "I Get Lonely" is a cover of the song "FanMail", written by Dallas Austin, as performed by TLC.
- "Jodeci Freestyle" contains a sample of "4 U", written by Donald DeGrate, as performed by Jodeci.
- "Free Spirit" contains a sample of "I Will Be Your Friend", written by Stuart Matthewman and Sade Adu, as performed by Sade.
- "Heat of the Moment" contains a sample of "Phone Sex (That's What's Up)", written by Myron Avant and Stephen Huff, as performed by Avant.
- "Girls Love Beyoncé" contains a sample of "Say My Name", written by LaShawn Daniels, Fred Jerkins III, Rodney Jerkins, Beyoncé Knowles, LeToya Luckett, LaTavia Roberson and Kelly Rowland, as performed by Destiny's Child.
- "Paris Morton Music" contains a sample of "Aston Martin Music", written by Aubrey Graham, Kevin Crowe, Erik Oritz, Chrisette Payne and William Roberts, as performed by Rick Ross.
- "Can I" contains a sample of "The Draize Train", written by Johnny Marr, as performed by The Smiths.

== Personnel ==
Credits adapted from Tidal.

- Drake – lead vocals (all tracks)
- J. Cole – featured vocals (track 11)
- Rick Ross – featured vocals (track 13)
- James Fauntleroy – featured vocals (track 15)
- Sampha – background vocals (track 2), production (track 2)
- Wade O. Brown – background vocals (track 15)
- Beyoncé – additional vocals (track 17)
- Adrian "X" Eccleston – guitar (track 4)
- Noah "40" Shebib – production (tracks 1, 2, 4, 5, 9, 10, 12–15, 17), co-production (track 11)
- Boi-1da – production (tracks 3, 6, 8), co-production (track 10)
- T-Minus – production (track 4)
- PartyNextDoor – production (track 5)
- Ducko McFli – production (track 6)
- Syk Sense – production (track 6)
- Vinylz – production (tracks 7, 8)
- Frank Dukes – production (track 7)
- Noel Cadastre – production (track 10)
- Jordan Evans – co-production (track 3)
- Allen Ritter – co-production (tracks 7, 8)
- Nikhil Seetharam – co-production (track 8)

== Charts ==
=== Weekly charts ===
Chart (2019)	Peak position
Australian Albums (ARIA)	7
Austrian Albums (Ö3 Austria)	48
Belgian Albums (Ultratop Flanders)	21
Belgian Albums (Ultratop Wallonia)	67
Canadian Albums (Billboard)	1
Danish Albums (Hitlisten)	11
Dutch Albums (Album Top 100)	8
French Albums (SNEP)	54
German Albums (Offizielle Top 100)	54
Irish Albums (IRMA)	7
Italian Albums (FIMI)	74
Lithuanian Albums (AGATA)	30
New Zealand Albums (RMNZ)	13
Norwegian Albums (VG-lista)	11
Scottish Albums (Official Charts)	75
Swedish Albums (Sverigetopplistan)	53
Swiss Albums (Schweizer Hitparade)	24
UK Albums (Official Charts)	4
UK R&B Albums (Official Charts)	1
US Billboard 200	1
US Top R&B/Hip-Hop Albums (Billboard)	1

=== Year-end charts ===
Chart (2019)	Position
US Billboard 200	172
US Top R&B/Hip-Hop Albums (Billboard)	68

== Certifications ==
Region	Certification	Certified units/sales
Canada (Music Canada)	Platinum	80,000^{‡}
New Zealand (RMNZ)	Gold	7,500^{‡}
United Kingdom (BPI)	Gold	100,000^{‡}
United States (RIAA)	Platinum	1,000,000^{‡}
^{‡} Sales+streaming figures based on certification alone.
