= A. K. Paul =

- Born: Anup Kumar Paul; 1986 (age 39–40)
- Origin: Rayners Lane, London, England
- Genres: Electronic; R&B; pop
- Occupations: Singer, songwriter, record producer, instrumentalist, bass player, recording engineer
- Instruments: Bass, synthesizer, guitar
- Years active: 2011–present
- Label: Paul Institute

Anup Kumar Paul (born 1986) is an English singer, songwriter and producer from London. Paul came to prominence in 2011 as a contributor to his brother Jai Paul's debut single "BTSTU (Edit)". The following year, he co-wrote the demo of Jai's single "Jasmine", as well as Big Boi's song "Higher Res".

Paul is the recipient of two Ivor Novello Awards, which he received in 2013 for his work on Emeli Sandé's single "Next to Me". A. K, Jai and Muz Azar then launched the Paul Institute, a record label and musical incubator; its first release was Paul's 2016 debut single, "Landcruisin'". In 2023, Paul performed live as a part of Jai's debut performances at Coachella and subsequent tour.

== Early life ==
A. K. Paul grew up in Rayners Lane, London, with his younger brother Jai Paul, also an acclaimed producer and songwriter. He is credited as a collaborator on Jai's early singles, and said that when Jai initially sent "BTSTU" to him, it "changed the way" he thought about music.

== Career ==
A. K. Paul was first credited as a co-writer on his brother Jai's debut and second single, which were released in 2011 and 2012. A. K. has worked with numerous artists as a musician, songwriter and producer. These include Nao, Sam Smith, Miguel, Foals, Big Boi, HIRA, Maverick Sabre, Jessie Ware, JONES, Daniel Avery, Wesley Joseph, Reinen, Ruthven, Kelela, and Emeli Sandé. Paul is a multi-instrumentalist and has often contributed bass parts to tracks, alongside production and songwriting credits. One of A. K.'s collaborators, NAO, said of the Paul brothers: "They've been sonic pioneers and broken all the rules about how you write, arrange and mix, but not at the expense of musicality. I think most artists working within alternative funk, R&B or indie music have tried to work out how they do it, but it's not anything you can recreate."

=== 2010s ===
Paul is credited as providing additional vocals and sound design on Jai Paul's demo recording "BTSTU", as well as mastering the track. The demo received widespread blog coverage throughout 2010, leading to significant UK national radio play. In 2011, Jai Paul's record label XL Recordings gave the demo an official release as "BTSTU (Edit)" to favourable reviews. He provided bass guitar and sound design for Jai Paul's 2012 release, "Jasmine (demo)", and also mastered the track, as with Jai Paul's debut release. "Jasmine (demo)" received critical acclaim in the media, with Pitchfork featuring the song as a "Best New Track" within an hour of its appearance on SoundCloud, The New York Times praising its "Prince era sensuality" and The Guardian describing the production as "amazing". The song appears on the soundtrack to the 2013 video game, Grand Theft Auto V.

Paul collaborated with Hackney vocalist Nao on a song called "So Good" in 2014. This was the first time Paul applied the moniker A. K. Paul. That November, singer Jones collaborated with A. K. on a song called "You". In 2015, A. K. provided production on Miguel's album Wildheart for the song "Flesh". He also co-wrote three songs on Maverick Sabre's second studio album Innerstanding.

In March 2016, A. K., Jai Paul and Muz Azar announced the Paul Institute, a record label and musical incubator. This was accompanied by the release of the single "Landcruisin'", a song by A. K. Paul, via text messages and a website. "Landcruisin'" was the Paul Institute's first release. The song premiered on Zane Lowe's Beats 1 radio show before receiving digital, streaming, and 7-inch vinyl releases. Most music critics gave the song favourable reviews, comparing it to the works of Prince, D'Angelo, and Miguel. It managed to enter the Billboard Twitter Emerging Artists chart. James Vincent McMorrow reached out to A. K. Paul after listening to "Landcruisin'", calling it "a huge record". James asked Anup to put his own twist on the lead single from We Move, "Rising Water". The result was something extraordinary, James wrote in a statement to Complex. "He said to me after it was done that he's never done something like this before, lifted an entire vocal from an already written and produced song and then flipped the chord structure and premise of the song."

Paul collaborated with Guernsey born DJ Mura Masa with the track "Who Is It Gonna B" on Mura Masa's debut album. A. K. Paul also reached out to British R&B artist HIRA - working on production on the single "Eve" alongside Craze and Hoax. 2017 also saw the introduction of a new A. K. Paul demo track entitled "Be Honest" which was aired on an Apple Beats 1 broadcast of a live Mura Masa performance and DJ set.

=== 2020s ===
After a period of inactivity attributed to a legal fight, Paul released the final version of "Be Honest" in July 2020. He also worked on releases of Paul Institute artists Reinen and Ruthven, and appeared on two tracks from the album Friday Forever by Everything is Recorded, the musical project from XL Recordings label head, Richard Russell: "05:10 AM / Dream I Never Had", and "10:02 AM / Burnt Toast".

Paul uploaded a single on SoundCloud called "Cheers Mate" on 12 April 2021, which included a note that said: "additional voices from Reinen, K. Ustinov and 'Ohhh... yeah!' vox was recorded circa 1990, my dad on production."

He was credited as a producer (and additional producer) on four tracks from English rock band Foals' seventh album Life Is Yours, which released on 17 June 2022, via Warner/Transgressive/ADA. A.K. co-produced the track "Monsoon" on British artist Wesley Joseph's album GLOW, and was also featured in its music video. Paul Institute member Ruthven released his debut album Rough & Ready on 25 October 2025, for which Paul contributed writing and production for most songs.

Paul released a single "Watchin' U" on 22 May 2025, which had previously been teased in another Mura Masa Beats 1 Radio show in 2016. He co-wrote and co-produced the song "Ghostly" for another Transgressive Records artist, Miso Extra, which was released 19 February 2025, and released a new single, "We Get What We Deserve," in November 2025.

On 1 May, 2026, Paul hosted an NTS show celebrating the 10-year anniversary of "Landcruisin," and later in the month was announced as a collaborator on Kelela's "New Avatar" record.

== Discography ==
=== 2011-2019 ===
Song	Artist	Credit	Album	Release Date	UK Singles Chart	Certification
"BTSTU"	Jai Paul	Writing/Production/Background Vocals	Leak 04-13 (Bait Ones)	April 2011	-	-
"Jasmine"	Jai Paul	Writing/Production	Leak 04-13 (Bait Ones)	March 2012	-	-
"Higher Res"	Big Boi	Bass/Recording	Vicious Lies and Dangerous Rumors	December 2012	-	-
"Next To Me"	Emeli Sandé	Co-writing/Bass	Our Version of Events	February 2012	2	Platinum
	Jessie Ware	Guitars/Bass	Devotion	April 2013	105	
"Nirvana"	Sam Smith	Writing	Nirvana (EP)	January 2014	-	-
"So Good"	Nao	Writing/Production/Vocals	So Good E.P.	December 2014	-	-
"You"	JONES	Writing/Production	Indulge (EP)	June 2015	-	-
"FLESH"	Miguel	Writing/Production	Wildheart	June 2015	-	-
"Give It Up", "So Free" and "Mother"	Maverick Sabre	Writing	Innerstanding	October 2015	-	-
"Landcruisin'"	A.K. Paul	Writing/Production/Mixing/Mastering	Landcruisin'	March 2016	-	-
"Trophy"	Nao	Writing/Production/Vocals	For All We Know	July 2016	-	-
"Rising Water (A. K. Paul Remix)"	James Vincent McMorrow	Production/Additional Vocals	We Move	29 September 2016	-	-
"Eve"	HIRA	Production	Eve/Rarri	12 May 2017	-	-
"Who Is It Gonna B"	Mura Masa	Writing/Vocals	Mura Masa	14 July 2017	-	-
"Evil"	Ruthven	Production	Evil	16 November 2017	-	-
"Mystery"	Fabiana Palladino	Production	Mystery	16 November 2017	-	-
"Hypothalamus"	Ruthven	Production	Hypothalamus	25 July 2018	-	-
"Shimmer"	Fabiana Palladino	Production	Shimmer	25 July 2018	-	-

=== 2020-Present ===
"Be Honest"	A.K. Paul	Writing/Production/Mixing/Mastering/Vocals	Paul Institute - Summer 2020	28 July 2020	-	-
"Shadow Knight"	Reinen	Writing/Production	Paul Institute - Summer 2020	29 July 2020	-	-
"Have You Decided?"	Ruthven	Writing/Production/Mixing/Mastering	Paul Institute - Summer 2020	30 July 2020	-	-
"Cheers Mate"	A.K. Paul	Writing/Production/Mixing/Mastering/Vocals	SoundCloud release	12 April 2021	-	-
"Wake Me Up", "2001", "Summer Sky" and "Looking High"	Foals	Production	Life Is Yours	17 June 2022	-	-
"Monsoon"	Wesley Joseph	Production	Secretly Canadian/EEVILTWINN	20 April 2023	-	-
"Ghostly"	Miso Extra	Writing/Production	Earcandy	19 February 2025	-	-
"Watchin' U"	A.K. Paul	Writing/Production/Mixing/Mastering/Vocals	-	22 May 2025	-	-
"We Get What We Deserve"	A.K. Paul	Writing/Production/Mixing/Mastering/Vocals	-	5 November 2025	-	-
"Outta time"	Kelela	Production/Composition	New Avatar	10 July 2026	-	-
