= Jasmine (song) =

2012 song

Single by Jai Paul

from the album Leak 04-13 (Bait Ones)
- Released: 30 March 2012 (SoundCloud)
- Genre: R&B; pop
- Length: 4:13
- Label: XL
- Songwriter: Jai Paul

Jai Paul singles chronology
"BTSTU" (2010)	"Jasmine" (2012)	"Do You Love Her Now" / "He" (2019)

"Jasmine" is a song by Jai Paul, first released in 2012 as a digital download.

== Release ==
"Jasmine" was first released on SoundCloud on 30 March 2012. It was later re-released on Paul's debut album Leak 04-13 (Bait Ones) (2019), an unofficial version of which was leaked in 2013. Paul also released a version of the track on Bandcamp in 2013.

As of January 2020, a special edition vinyl release of "Jasmine" was expected. Jai Paul announced that the record—which was to be scented with jasmine—would contain a remix of the single. A website launched with Jai Paul's 2019 single "He"/"Do You Love Her Now" also allowed users to stream a version of "Jasmine".

== Reception ==
Fitzmaurice, naming "Jasmine" a best new track in a review for Pitchfork, described it as "echo-pop" and compared it to Daft Punk's 2003 single "Something About Us". Cragg noted similarities with the work of D'Angelo and Prince. Caramanica, who also compared "Jasmine" to Prince's work, described the song as a "whispery caress". Morpurgo, observing that the single's synthesizer loop resembles the work of Chromatics, classified "Jasmine" as R&B, as did Singh; while Rindner compares it to Off the Wall–era Michael Jackson. Bassil describes the song's "obscured" mixing as a hallmark of Jai Paul's style. In 2013, "Jasmine" was featured in the video game Grand Theft Auto V on the in-game radio station Radio Mirror Park.

== Covers ==
Ed Sheeran and Octavian have released cover versions of "Jasmine". And on 7 November 2023, Arlo Parks released a cover of the song as the lead single for the deluxe edition of her album My Soft Machine.
