= BTSTU =

Single by Jai Paul

from the album Leak 04-13 (Bait Ones)
- Released: 21 April 2011
- Recorded: 2007
- Studio: Home recording (Rayners Lane, London)
- Genre: Indie electronic; alternative R&B
- Length: 3:30
- Label: XL
- Songwriter(s): Jai Paul
- Producer(s): Jai Paul

Jai Paul singles chronology
"BTSTU" (2011)	"Jasmine" (2012)

Audio video
- "BTSTU (Edit)" on YouTube

"BTSTU" is a song by British songwriter and record producer Jai Paul. A demo recording of the song received widespread blog coverage throughout 2010 after having been uploaded to Paul's MySpace page, as well as receiving numerous plays on BBC Radio 1 in the UK. The BBC's Zane Lowe made "BTSTU (Demo)" his Hottest Record in the World. On the strength of this demo, Paul was long-listed for the BBC Sound of 2011 poll.

== Release ==
An edited version of "BTSTU" entitled "BTSTU (Edit)" was officially released on 21 April 2011, via XL Recordings. The song received airplay again on UK national radio by DJs including Gilles Peterson, Annie Mac, Nick Grimshaw, Reggie Yates, and Fearne Cotton, with Zane Lowe making it his Hottest Record in the World for a second time. Paul commented in 2011 that the name of the track is an acronym for "Back To Save The Universe", a reference to a lyric from the Radiohead song "Airbag".

== Critical reception ==
The single received favourable reviews from the Daily Telegraph and American blog 'The Wounded Jukebox'. Ryan Dombal of Pitchfork compared the single to "the unmistakable lope of one J Dilla".

"BTSTU" was included in the end-of-year lists in 2011 by Pitchfork, The Fader, and Pigeons and Planes. The Washington Post mentioned "BTSTU" in their 'Singles File: Best of 2011', describing it as "a precursor to the entire career of James Blake".

== Legacy ==
The song has been influential on underground as well as mainstream pop music in the 2010s. The song had struck a chord internationally. The Canadian rapper Drake leaked a track titled "Dreams Money Can Buy" which sampled "BTSTU (Demo)" in May 2011, which got resampled by Charli XCX in June 2012. In July 2011 the song was sampled again for Travis Garland and JoJo's duet "Paint", and New York singer-songwriter Niia uploaded a cover version of "BTSTU" to her SoundCloud page. The 2012 song "End of Time" by Beyoncé also sampled the song.

== Track listing ==
Digital download
No.	Title	Length
1.	"BTSTU" (edit)	3:30

2019 remastered vinyl
No.	Title	Length
1.	"BTSTU" (edit)	3:29
2.	"BTSTU" (demo)	3:41

== Personnel ==
- Jai Paul – vocals, electric guitar, drums, synthesizers, programming, SFX, engineering, mixing, sound design (remastered vinyl)
- Anup Paul – additional vocals, sound design, mastering (edit)
- Sam Pickering – saxophone
- Dave Cooley – mastering (remastered vinyl)

== Charts ==
Chart (2011)	Peak position
UK Singles (Official Charts Company)	139

== Release history ==
Version	Date	Format	Label
Demo	2010	Digital download	—
Edit	21 April 2011	Digital download	XL
Edit	6 June 2011	CD-R	XL
Remastered	1 June 2019	12-inch single	XL
