= Talia Chetrit =

American artist and photographer

Talia Chetrit (born 1982) is an American photographer. She is known for her photographic still lifes, nude portraiture and for the inclusion of references to the apparatus of photography in her work.

== Early life and education ==
Chetrit was born and grew up in Washington, D.C.

== Fashion photography ==
For their debut women’s show for Loewe at Paris Fashion Week in 2025, designers Jack McCollough and Lazaro Hernandez commissioned Chetrit with an advertising campaign featuring Lewis Gribben, Isla Johnston, Erin Kellyman, Orlando Norman, Megan Northam, Eva Victor and Théodore Pellerin.

== Collections ==
Chetrit's work is held in the following permanent collections:

- Whitney Museum of American Art
- Los Angeles County Museum of Art
