= Lorde discography =

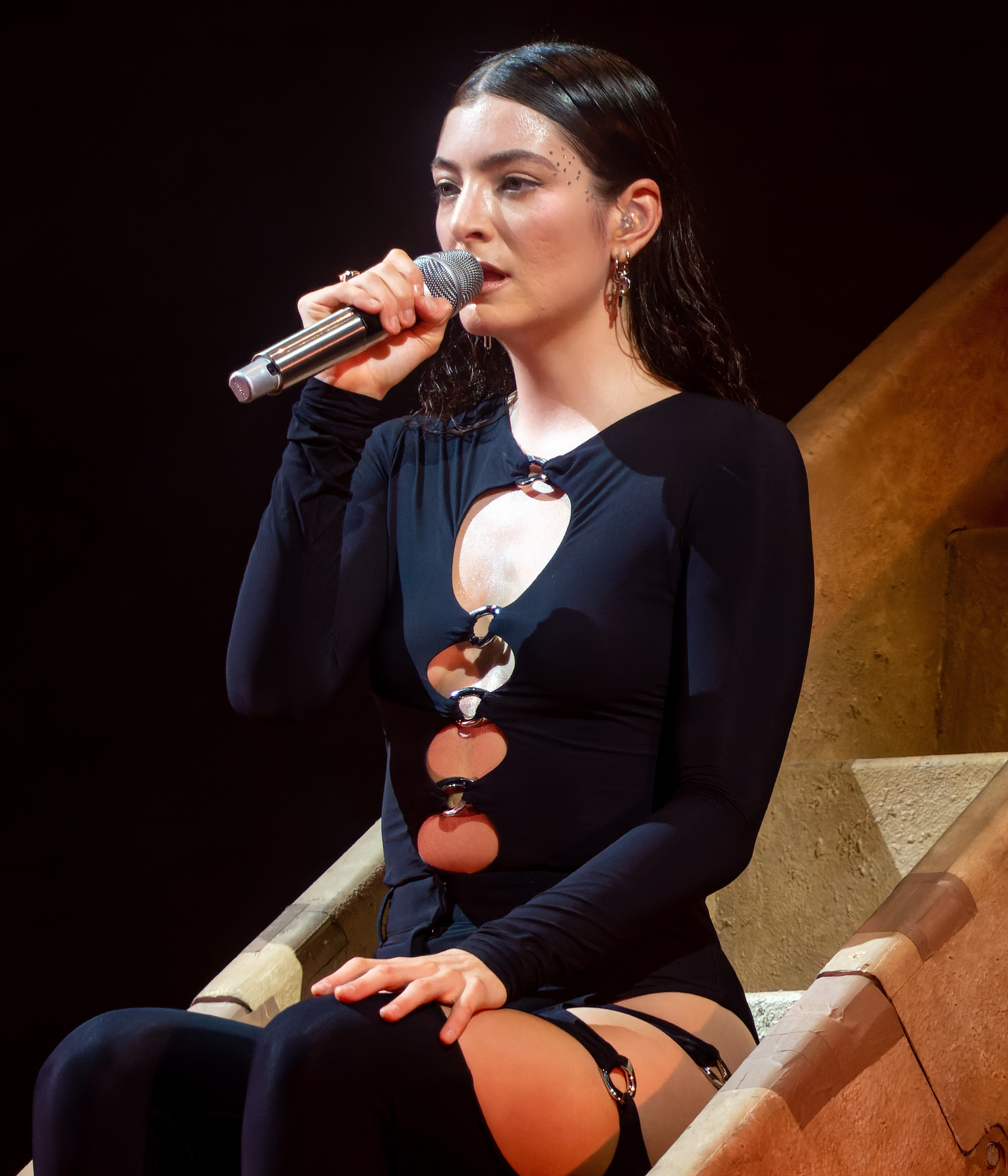
- Lorde performing in June 2022
- Studio albums: 4
- EPs: 4
- Soundtrack albums: 1
- Singles: 16
- Music videos: 16
- Promotional singles: 12

New Zealand singer-songwriter Lorde has released four studio albums, four extended plays, one soundtrack album, 16 singles (including one as a featured artist), 12 promotional singles and 16 music videos. At the age of 13, she was signed to Universal Music Group (UMG) and started to write music. In November 2012, when she was 16 years old, she self-released The Love Club EP via SoundCloud. It was released for sale by UMG in March 2013; a song from the EP, "Royals", topped numerous single charts internationally, including the US Billboard Hot 100. The track sold over 10 million units worldwide, making it one of the best-selling singles of all time.

Later that year, Lorde released her debut studio album Pure Heroine, which included "Royals". It charted at number one in New Zealand and Australia, and achieved certifications in several countries. As of June 2021, the album has sold over six million copies worldwide. It was preceded by three additional singles: "Tennis Court", "Team", and "Glory and Gore". "Team" was a top-ten hit in several single charts, including Canada and the United States. The following year, Lorde recorded four songs for the soundtrack album of the 2014 film The Hunger Games: Mockingjay, Part 1, including the single "Yellow Flicker Beat".

Lorde's second studio album, Melodrama, was released in June 2017 and topped the charts in four countries, including the United States. It yielded three singles: "Green Light", "Perfect Places", and a remix of "Homemade Dynamite" (featuring Khalid, SZA, and Post Malone); the former reached the top-ten in Australia and Canada. Her third studio album, Solar Power (2021), topped the charts in New Zealand and Australia. It featured four singles, including the titular track, which peaked at number two on New Zealand's singles chart. Five songs from the album were then reworked into Māori for her EP Te Ao Mārama (2021). In June 2025, Lorde released her fourth studio album, Virgin, which was preceded by the singles "What Was That" and "Man of the Year".

== Albums ==
=== Studio albums ===
List of studio albums, with selected chart positions, sales, and certifications
Title	Album details	Peak chart positions										Sales	Certifications
Title	Album details	NZ	AUS	CAN	DEN	FRA	GER	SCO	SWE	UK	US	Sales	Certifications
Pure Heroine	Released: 27 September 2013; Label: UMG, Virgin EMI, Republic; Format: CD, LP, digital download, streaming	1	1	2	12	20	13	6	6	4	3	AUS: 100,000 (Note: Australia sales figures for Pure Heroine as of January 2014.); UK: 372,000 (Note: UK sales figures for Pure Heroine as of August 2021.); US: 1,700,000 (Note: United States sales figures for Pure Heroine as of January 2018.)	RMNZ: 9× Platinum; ARIA: 5× Platinum; BPI: Platinum; BVMI: Platinum; IFPI DEN: 2× Platinum; IFPI SWE: 2× Platinum; MC: 6× Platinum; RIAA: 6× Platinum; SNEP: Platinum
Melodrama	Released: 16 June 2017; Label: UMG, Virgin EMI, Republic; Format: CD, LP, digital download, streaming	1	1	1	6	29	11	7	10	5	1	AUS: 12,001 (Note: Australia sales figures for Melodrama as of June 2017.); UK: 169,000 (Note: UK sales figures for Melodrama as of August 2021.); US: 248,000 (Note: US sales figures for Melodrama as of June 2021)	RMNZ: 4× Platinum; ARIA: 2× Platinum; BPI: Gold; IFPI DEN: Platinum; IFPI SWE: Gold; MC: 2× Platinum; RIAA: Platinum; SNEP: Gold
Solar Power	Released: 20 August 2021; Label: UMG, Virgin EMI, Republic; Format: LP, digital download, streaming	1	1	6	10	16	4	2	18	2	5		RMNZ: Platinum; BPI: Silver
Virgin	Released: 27 June 2025; Label: UMG; Format: CD, digital download, LP, streaming	1	1	3	12	26	3	1	14	1	2		RMNZ: Gold; BPI: Silver

=== Soundtrack albums ===
List of soundtrack albums, with selected chart positions and details
Title	Album details	Peak chart positions										Sales	Certifications
Title	Album details	NZ	AUS	AUT	BEL (FL)	CAN	GER	SWI	UK Comp.	US	US OST	Sales	Certifications
The Hunger Games: Mockingjay (by various artists)	Released: 17 November 2014; Label: Republic; Formats: CD, digital download	9	36	60	58	22	73	64	35	18	3	US: 21,000	RMNZ: Gold

=== Demo albums ===
Title	Album details
Xrays (as eeeeyyyoooooo)	Released: 26 June 2026; Label: Self-released; Formats: Digital download

== Extended plays ==
List of extended plays, with selected chart positions, sales, and certifications
Title	Extended play details	Peak chart positions						Sales	Certifications
Title	Extended play details	NZ	AUS	CAN	US	US Rock	US World	Sales	Certifications
The Love Club EP	Released: 8 March 2013; Label: UMG; Format: CD, digital download, 10-inch vinyl	2	2 (Note: In Australia, The Love Club EP appeared on the Australian Singles Chart; songs on the EP therefore could not chart separately.)	22	23	6	—	US: 60,000 (Note: United States sales figures for The Love Club EP as of August 2013.)	RMNZ: 3× Platinum; ARIA: 16× Platinum; MC: Platinum
Tennis Court EP	Released: 7 June 2013; Label: UMG, Virgin EMI; Format: Digital download, 10-inch vinyl	—	—	—	—	—	—		
Live in Concert	Released: 1 November 2013; Label: UMG; Format: Streamed audio	—	—	—	—	—	—		
Te Ao Mārama	Released: 9 September 2021; Label: UMG; Format: Digital download, streaming	4	—	—	— (Note: Te Ao Mārama did not enter the US Billboard 200 but peaked at number 70 on the Current Album Sales chart.)	—	15		
"—" denotes a recording that did not chart in that territory.

== Singles ==
=== As lead artist ===
List of singles as lead artist, with selected chart positions and certifications, showing year released and album name
Title	Year	Peak chart positions										Certifications	Album
Title	Year	NZ	AUS	CAN	FRA	GER	IRL	NLD	SWE	UK	US	Certifications	Album
"Royals" (Note: "Royals" is also featured on The Love Club EP. The song promoted the EP in New Zealand and Australia and Pure Heroine elsewhere.)	2013	1	— (Note: In Australia, The Love Club EP appeared on the Australian Singles Chart; songs on the EP therefore could not chart separately. However, "Royals" charted on the ARIA Digital Track Chart and peaked at number 2.)	1	4	8	1	4	4	1	1	RMNZ: 7× Platinum; BPI: 3× Platinum; BVMI: 3× Gold; IFPI SWE: 4× Platinum; MC: Diamond; RIAA: 15× Platinum; SNEP: Diamond	Pure Heroine
"Tennis Court"	2013	1	20	78	193	83	—	— (Note: "Tennis Court" did not enter the Netherlands' Single Top 100, but peaked at number 24 on the Netherlands' Single Tip Chart.)	—	78	71	RMNZ: 3× Platinum; ARIA: 5× Platinum; BPI: Gold; MC: 2× Platinum; RIAA: 2× Platinum	Pure Heroine
"Team"	2013	3	19	3	24	20	32	36	39	29	6	RMNZ: 4× Platinum; ARIA: 7× Platinum; BPI: Platinum; BVMI: Gold; IFPI SWE: Platinum; MC: 7× Platinum; RIAA: 6× Platinum; SNEP: Platinum	Pure Heroine
"Glory and Gore"	2014	— (Note: "Glory and Gore" did not enter the Official New Zealand Music Chart, but peaked at number 16 on the New Zealand Artists chart.)	100	— (Note: "Glory and Gore" did not enter the Canadian Hot 100, but peaked at number 75 on the Hot Canadian Digital Song Sales chart.)	—	—	—	—	—	—	68	RMNZ: Gold; ARIA: Gold; MC: Gold; RIAA: Platinum	Pure Heroine
"Yellow Flicker Beat"	2014	4	25	21	93	38	83	— (Note: "Yellow Flicker Beat" did not enter the Netherlands' Single Top 100, but peaked at number one on the Netherlands' Single Tip Chart.)	—	71	34	RMNZ: Platinum; ARIA: Platinum; MC: Platinum; RIAA: Platinum	The Hunger Games: Mockingjay – Part 1
"Green Light"	2017	1	4	9	24	33	17	61	58	20	19	RMNZ: 5× Platinum; ARIA: 8× Platinum; BPI: 2× Platinum; BVMI: Gold; MC: 4× Platinum; RIAA: 2× Platinum; SNEP: Gold	Melodrama
"Perfect Places"	2017	11	44	76	—	—	91	—	—	95	— (Note: "Perfect Places" did not enter the Billboard Hot 100, but peaked at number 13 on the Bubbling Under Hot 100 Singles chart.)	RMNZ: 2× Platinum; ARIA: 2× Platinum; BPI: Silver; MC: Platinum; RIAA: Platinum	Melodrama
"Homemade Dynamite" (remix) (featuring Khalid, Post Malone and SZA)	2017	13	23	54	—	— (Note: "Homemade Dynamite" did not enter the German Singles Chart, but peaked at number 8 on the Deutsche Single Trend Chart.)	61	92	84	82	92	RMNZ: Platinum; ARIA: 5× Platinum; BPI: Silver; MC: 2× Platinum; RIAA: Platinum	Melodrama
"Solar Power"	2021	2	14	22	—	—	11	99	54	17	64	RMNZ: Platinum; ARIA: Platinum; BPI: Silver; MC: Gold	Solar Power
"Stoned at the Nail Salon"	2021	22	60	—	—	—	75	—	—	85	—	RMNZ: Gold; ARIA: Gold	Solar Power
"Mood Ring"	2021	10	29	76	—	—	44	—	— (Note: "Mood Ring" did not enter the Swedish Singellista Chart, but peaked at number 16 on the Swedish Heatseeker Chart.)	48	— (Note: "Mood Ring" did not enter the Billboard Hot 100, but peaked at number 18 on the Bubbling Under Hot 100 chart.)	RMNZ: Gold; ARIA: Gold	Solar Power
"Fallen Fruit"	2021	— (Note: "Fallen Fruit" did not enter the NZ Top 40 Singles Chart, but peaked at number six on the NZ Hot Singles Chart.)	—	—	—	—	—	—	—	—	—		Solar Power
"What Was That"	2025	1	9	31	—	33	6	83	54	11	36	RMNZ: Gold; ARIA: Gold; BPI: Silver; MC: Gold	Virgin
"Man of the Year"	2025	11	92	85	—	—	56	—	—	62	— (Note: "Man of the Year" did not enter the Billboard Hot 100, but peaked at number 1 on the Bubbling Under Hot 100 chart.)		Virgin
"Hammer"	2025	29	98	—	—	—	68	—	—	66	— (Note: "Hammer" did not enter the Billboard Hot 100, but peaked at number 20 on the Bubbling Under Hot 100 chart.)		Virgin
"—" denotes a recording that did not chart in that territory.

=== As featured artist ===
List of singles as featured artist, with selected chart positions and certifications, showing year released and album name
Title	Year	Peaks										Certifications	Album
Title	Year	NZ	AUS	BEL (FL)	CAN	FRA	IRE	NED	POR	UK	US Bub.	Certifications	Album
"Magnets" (Disclosure featuring Lorde)	2015	2	14	36	58	87	64	74	93	71	2	RMNZ: 2× Platinum; ARIA: 3× Platinum; BPI: Silver	Caracal
"Mind Loaded" (Blood Orange featuring Caroline Polachek, Lorde and Mustafa)	2025	— (Note: "Mind Loaded" did not enter the NZ Top 40 Singles Chart, but peaked at number 22 on the NZ Hot Singles Chart.)	—	—	—	—	—	—	—	—	—		Essex Honey
"—" denotes a recording that did not chart in that territory.

=== Promotional singles ===
List of promotional singles, with selected chart positions and certifications, showing year released and album name
Title	Year	Peaks										Certifications	Album
Title	Year	NZ	AUS	CAN	CZ	FRA	IRL	SWI	UK	US	WW	Certifications	Album
"Bravado"	2013	— (Note: "Bravado" did not enter the Official New Zealand Music Chart, but peaked at number 5 on the New Zealand Artists chart.)	—	—	—	—	—	—	—	—	—	RMNZ: Gold; ARIA: Gold	The Love Club EP
"Buzzcut Season"	2013	— (Note: "Buzzcut Season" did not enter the Official New Zealand Music Chart, but peaked at number 18 on the New Zealand National Singles chart.)	— (Note: "Buzzcut Season" did not enter the ARIA Top 100 Singles Chart, but peaked at number 38 on the Australian Streaming Tracks chart.)	—	—	—	—	—	— (Note: "Buzzcut Season" did not enter the UK Singles Chart, but peaked at number 72 on the UK Streaming Chart.)	—	—	RMNZ: Platinum; ARIA: Platinum; BPI: Silver; MC: Platinum; RIAA: Platinum	Pure Heroine
"Ribs"	2013	29	77	76	—	—	16	—	— (Note: "Ribs" did not enter the UK Singles Chart, but peaked at number 69 on the UK Streaming Chart.)	99	—	RMNZ: 4× Platinum; ARIA: 4× Platinum; BPI: Platinum; MC: 4× Platinum; RIAA: 4× Platinum	Pure Heroine
"No Better"	2013	— (Note: "No Better" did not enter the NZ Top 40 Singles Chart, but peaked at number seven on the NZ Artist Singles Chart.)	—	—	—	—	—	—	—	—	—		Pure Heroine
"Flicker" (Kanye West Rework)	2014	—	—	—	—	—	—	—	—	—	—		The Hunger Games: Mockingjay – Part 1
"Team Ball Player Thing" (with #KiwisCureBatten)	2015	2	—	—	—	—	—	—	—	—	—		Non-album single
"Liability"	2017	8	42	62	79	54	74	86	84	78	—	RMNZ: 2× Platinum; ARIA: 2× Platinum; BPI: Gold; MC: 2× Platinum; RIAA: Platinum	Melodrama
"Sober"	2017	18	61	84	89	—	—	—	—	— (Note: "Sober" did not chart on the Billboard Hot 100, but peaked at number 48 on the Digital Song Sales chart.)	—	RMNZ: Gold; ARIA: Gold; MC: Gold	Melodrama
"Secrets from a Girl (Who's Seen It All)"	2022	— (Note: "Secrets from a Girl (Who's Seen It All)" did not enter the NZ Top 40 Singles Chart, but peaked at number 10 on the Top 20 New Zealand Singles Chart.)	—	—	—	—	—	—	—	—	—		Solar Power
"Take Me to the River"	2024	— (Note: "Take Me to the River" did not enter the NZ Top 40 Singles Chart, but peaked at number 11 on the NZ Hot Singles Chart.)	—	—	—	—	—	—	—	—	—		Everyone's Getting Involved
"Girl, So Confusing" (Charli XCX featuring Lorde)	2024	24	—	57	—	—	—	—	28	63	59		Brat and It's Completely Different but Also Still Brat
"Kāhore He Manu E" (with Marlon Williams)	2025	— (Note: "Kāhore He Manu E" did not enter the NZ Top 40 Singles Chart, but peaked at number 15 on the NZ Hot Singles Chart.)	—	—	—	—	—	—	—	—	—		Te Whare Tīwekaweka
"—" denotes a recording that did not chart in that territory.

== Other charted songs ==
List of songs, with selected chart positions, showing year released and album name
Title	Year	Peak chart positions										Certifications	Album
Title	Year	NZ	AUS	AUT	BEL (FL)	CZ	FRA	IRL	UK	US Bub.	WW	Certifications	Album
"Million Dollar Bills"	2013	— (Note: "Million Dollar Bills" did not enter the NZ Top 40 Singles Chart, but peaked at number nineteen on the NZ Artist Singles Chart.)	—	—	—	—	—	—	—	—	—		The Love Club EP
"The Love Club"	2013	17	—	—	—	—	—	—	—	20	—	RMNZ: Platinum; ARIA: Platinum	The Love Club EP
"Swingin Party"	2013	10	—	—	—	—	—	—	—	—	—		Tennis Court EP
"400 Lux"	2013	— (Note: "400 Lux" did not enter the NZ Top 40 Singles Chart, but peaked at number fourteen on the NZ Artist Singles Chart.)	— (Note: "400 Lux" did not enter the ARIA Top 100 Singles Chart, but peaked at number 28 on the Australian Streaming Tracks chart.)	—	—	—	—	—	— (Note: "400 Lux" did not enter the UK Singles Chart, but peaked at number 59 on the UK Streaming Chart.)	—	—	RMNZ: Gold; ARIA: Platinum; RIAA: Platinum	Pure Heroine
"White Teeth Teens"	2013	—	—	—	—	—	—	—	—	—	—	RMNZ: Gold; ARIA: Gold	Pure Heroine
"A World Alone"	2013	— (Note: "A World Alone" did not enter the NZ Top 40 Singles Chart, but peaked at number fifteen on the NZ Artist Singles Chart.)	—	—	—	—	—	—	—	—	—	RMNZ: Gold; ARIA: Gold	Pure Heroine
"Everybody Wants to Rule the World"	2013	14	53	—	—	—	93	97	65	—	—	RMNZ: Gold; ARIA: Platinum; BPI: Silver	The Hunger Games: Catching Fire
"Meltdown" (Stromae featuring Pusha T, Q-Tip, Haim and Lorde)	2014	— (Note: "Meltdown" did not enter the NZ Top 40 Singles Chart, but peaked at number nineteen on the NZ Artist Singles Chart.)	—	—	7	—	107	—	—	—	—		The Hunger Games: Mockingjay, Part 1
"Ladder Song"	2014	— (Note: "Ladder Song" did not enter the NZ Top 40 Singles Chart, but peaked at number fourteen on the NZ Artist Singles Chart.)	—	—	—	—	—	—	—	—	—		The Hunger Games: Mockingjay, Part 1
"Homemade Dynamite"	2017	13	—	71	— (Note: "Homemade Dynamite" did not enter the Flanders Ultratop Top 50, but peaked at number 5 on the Flanders Ultratip Bubbling Under chart.)	46	—	61	82	—	—	RMNZ: Platinum; BPI: Silver	Melodrama
"The Louvre"	2017	— (Note: "The Louvre" did not enter the NZ Top 40 Singles Chart, but peaked at number one on the NZ Heatseeker Singles Chart, and number four on the NZ Artist Singles Chart.)	—	—	—	—	—	—	—	—	—	RMNZ: Platinum; ARIA: Platinum	Melodrama
"Hard Feelings/Loveless"	2017	— (Note: "Hard Feelings/Loveless" did not enter the NZ Top 40 Singles Chart, but peaked at number eight on the NZ Artist Singles Chart.)	—	—	—	—	—	—	—	—	—	RMNZ: Gold; ARIA: Gold	Melodrama
"Sober II (Melodrama)"	2017	— (Note: "Sober II (Melodrama)" did not enter the NZ Top 40 Singles Chart, but peaked at number ten on the NZ Artist Singles Chart.)	—	—	—	—	—	—	—	—	—	RMNZ: Gold	Melodrama
"Writer in the Dark"	2017	— (Note: "Writer in the Dark" did not enter the NZ Top 40 Singles Chart, but peaked at number two on the NZ Heatseeker Singles Chart, and number seven on the NZ Artist Singles Chart.)	—	—	—	—	—	—	—	—	—	RMNZ: Gold; ARIA: Gold	Melodrama
"Supercut"	2017	— (Note: "Supercut" did not enter the NZ Top 40 Singles Chart, but peaked at number seven on the NZ Artist Singles Chart.)	—	—	—	—	—	—	—	—	—	RMNZ: 2× Platinum; ARIA: 2× Platinum; BPI: Gold; RIAA: Platinum	Melodrama
"Liability (Reprise)"	2017	— (Note: "Liability (Reprise)" did not enter the NZ Top 40 Singles Chart, but peaked at number eleven on the NZ Artist Singles Chart.)	—	—	—	—	—	—	—	—	—		Melodrama
"Supercut" (El-P Remix) (featuring Run the Jewels)	2018	— (Note: "Supercut" (El-P Remix) did not enter the NZ Top 40 Singles Chart, but peaked at number nine on the NZ Heatseeker Singles Chart.)	—	—	— (Note: "Supercut" (El-P Remix) did not enter the Flanders Ultratop Top 50, but charted as an "extra tip" on the Flanders Ultratip Bubbling Under chart.)	—	—	—	—	—	—		Non-album song
"The Path"	2021	25	73	—	—	—	—	—	—	—	—		Solar Power
"California"	2021	— (Note: "California" did not enter the NZ Top 40 Singles Chart, but peaked at number five on the NZ Hot Singles Chart.)	95	—	—	—	—	—	—	—	—		Solar Power
"The Man with the Axe"	2021	— (Note: "The Man with the Axe" did not enter the NZ Top 40 Singles Chart, but peaked at number 14 on the Top 20 New Zealand Singles Chart.)	—	—	—	—	—	—	—	—	—		Solar Power
"Dominoes"	2021	— (Note: "Dominoes" did not enter the NZ Top 40 Singles Chart, but peaked at number 15 on the Top 20 New Zealand Singles Chart.)	—	—	—	—	—	—	—	—	—		Solar Power
"Big Star"	2021	— (Note: "Big Star" did not enter the NZ Top 40 Singles Chart, but peaked at number 16 on the Top 20 New Zealand Singles Chart.)	—	—	—	—	—	—	—	—	—		Solar Power
"Leader of a New Regime"	2021	— (Note: "Leader of a New Regime" did not enter the NZ Top 40 Singles Chart, but peaked at number 19 on the Top 20 New Zealand Singles Chart.)	—	—	—	—	—	—	—	—	—		Solar Power
"Oceanic Feeling"	2021	— (Note: "Oceanic Feeling" did not enter the NZ Top 40 Singles Chart, but peaked at number 17 on the Top 20 New Zealand Singles Chart.)	—	—	—	—	—	—	—	—	—		Solar Power
"Te Ara Tika / The Path"	2021	— (Note: "Te Ara Tika / The Path" did not enter the NZ Top 40 Singles Chart, but peaked at number 39 on the NZ Hot Singles Chart.)	—	—	—	—	—	—	—	—	—		Te Ao Mārama
"Te Ao Mārama / Solar Power"	2021	— (Note: "Te Ao Mārama / Solar Power" did not enter the NZ Top 40 Singles Chart, but peaked at number 13 on the NZ Hot Singles Chart.)	—	—	—	—	—	—	—	—	—		Te Ao Mārama
"Mata Kohore / Stoned at the Nail Salon"	2021	— (Note: "Mata Kohore / Stoned at the Nail Salon" did not enter the NZ Top 40 Singles Chart, but peaked at number 32 on the NZ Hot Singles Chart.)	—	—	—	—	—	—	—	—	—		Te Ao Mārama
"Hine-i-te-Awatea / Oceanic Feeling"	2021	— (Note: "Hine-i-te-Awatea / Oceanic Feeling" did not enter the NZ Top 40 Singles Chart, but peaked at number 18 on the Hot NZ Singles Chart.)	—	—	—	—	—	—	—	—	—		Te Ao Mārama
"Helen of Troy"	2021	— (Note: "Helen of Troy" did not enter the NZ Top 40 Singles Chart, but peaked at number 15 on the Hot NZ Singles Chart.)	—	—	—	—	—	—	—	—	—		Solar Power
"Hold No Grudge"	2021	— (Note: "Hold No Grudge" did not enter the NZ Top 40 Singles Chart, but peaked at number 24 on the NZ Hot Singles Chart.)	—	—	—	—	—	—	—	—	—		Solar Power
"Shapeshifter"	2025	11	—	—	—	—	—	54	44	1	156		Virgin
"Favourite Daughter"	2025	24	—	—	—	—	—	—	—	—	—		Virgin
"Current Affairs"	2025	23	—	—	—	—	—	—	—	—	—		Virgin
"Clearblue"	2025	— (Note: "Clearblue" did not enter the NZ Top 40 Singles Chart, but peaked at number six on the NZ Hot Singles Chart.)	—	—	—	—	—	—	—	—	—		Virgin
"David"	2025	— (Note: "David" did not enter the NZ Top 40 Singles Chart, but peaked at number two on the Hot 20 Aotearoa Singles Chart.)	—	—	—	—	—	75	—	—	—	RMNZ: Gold	Virgin
"—" denotes a recording that did not chart in that territory.

== Other appearances ==
The following songs are not singles or promotional singles and have not appeared on an album by Lorde:

Title	Year	Other performer(s)	Album
"Piece of Mind"	2012	And They Were Masked	Characters
"Sands of John"	2012	And They Were Masked	Characters
"Everybody Wants to Rule the World"	2013	none	The Hunger Games: Catching Fire
"Easy (Switch Screens)"	2014	Son Lux	Alternate Worlds
"All Apologies"	2014	Dave Grohl, Krist Novoselic, Annie Clark, Kim Gordon, Joan Jett, Pat Smear	The Rock & Roll Hall of Fame: In Concert 2014
"Retrograde"	2014	none	Triple J: Like a Version 10
"Meltdown"	2014	Stromae, Pusha T, Q-Tip, Haim	The Hunger Games: Mockingjay, Part 1
"Ladder Song"	2014	none	The Hunger Games: Mockingjay, Part 1
"Don't Take the Money"	2017	Bleachers	MTV Unplugged
"Blouse"	2021	Clairo	Sling
"Reaper"	2021	Clairo	Sling

== Songwriting credits ==
List of songs written or co-written for other artists, showing year released and album name
Title	Year	Artist	Album
"All My Love"	2014	Major Lazer, Ariana Grande	The Hunger Games: Mockingjay, Part 1
"Heartlines"	2016	Broods	Conscious
"Don't Take the Money"	2017	Bleachers	Gone Now

== Music videos ==
Title	Year	Director	Ref.
"Royals"	2013	Joel Kefali	
"Tennis Court"	2013	Joel Kefali	
"Team"	2013	Young Replicant	
"Yellow Flicker Beat"	2014	Emily Kai Bock	
"Magnets"	2015	Ryan Hope	
"Green Light"	2017	Grant Singer	
"Perfect Places"	2017	Grant Singer	
"Solar Power"	2021	Joel Kefali; Ella Yelich-O'Connor	
"Mood Ring"	2021	Joel Kefali; Ella Yelich-O'Connor	
"Fallen Fruit"	2021	Joel Kefali; Ella Yelich-O'Connor	
"Leader of a New Regime"	2021	Joel Kefali; Ella Yelich-O'Connor	
"Secrets from a Girl (Who's Seen It All)"	2022	Joel Kefali; Ella Yelich-O'Connor	
"The Path"	2022	Joel Kefali; Ella Yelich-O'Connor	
"Oceanic Feeling"	2022	Joel Kefali; Ella Yelich-O'Connor	
"What Was That"	2025	Terrence O'Connor; Ella Yelich-O'Connor	
"Man of the Year"	2025	Grant Singer	
“Hammer”	2025	Renell Medrano	
