= Fallen Fruit (song) =

2021 single by Lorde

Single by Lorde

from the album Solar Power
- Released: 2 November 2021
- Studio: Sound City Studios (Los Angeles, CA)
- Genre: Psychedelic folk
- Length: 3:58
- Label: Universal
- Songwriters: Ella Yelich-O'Connor; Jack Antonoff
- Producers: Jack Antonoff; Lorde

Lorde singles chronology
"Mood Ring" (2021)	"Fallen Fruit" (2021)	"Secrets from a Girl (Who's Seen It All)" (2022)

Music video
- "Fallen Fruit" on YouTube

"Fallen Fruit" is a song by New Zealand singer-songwriter Lorde. The song was released as the fourth single from her third studio album, Solar Power, coinciding with the release of the album's bonus tracks to streaming services on 2 November 2021. The song was written and produced by Lorde and Jack Antonoff, and features backing vocals from Phoebe Bridgers, Clairo, Marlon Williams, and Lawrence Arabia.

== Background and composition ==
"Fallen Fruit" is a folk song, featuring electronic drums. The tracklist for Solar Power was revealed on 21 June 2021, with the song serving as the album's fifth track. Laura Snapes of The Guardian described "Fallen Fruit" as a protest song, calling it a "crushed flower-power lament for the spoiled Eden her generation inherited". The song is written in the key of F-sharp minor and has a tempo of 62 beats per minute. Lorde's vocals range from F#_{3} to B_{4}. Backing vocals from Phoebe Bridgers, Clairo, Marlon Williams, and Lawrence Arabia are featured on the track.

== Critical reception ==
In NME, Rhian Daly wrote that "'Fallen Fruit' takes on the generations that came before us, condemning them, over unsettling folk music", and cited the track's usage of Mellotron and Wurlitzer as sounding "like they've been pulled from the soil rather than coursing with electricity". A Clash review called the song "somewhere between a prayer and a eulogy", remarking that "the stripped harmony-heavy sounds more like a Baez protest song or a wartime anthem than a Lorde track". The review suggested that "Fallen Fruit" addressed fame, saying that "its haunting lyrics look directly at fame", and calling it a hymn for Lorde's "famous friends".

Matt Mitchell of Paste labelled the song Lorde's "op-ed about climate change", stating that Lorde's vision of the world "becomes clear" with the line "but how can I love what I know I am gonna lose", writing that "she's seen the shitshow of the world and just wants to peace out, smoke a bowl and walk hand-in-hand with her girlfriends through psychedelic gardens". Slant writer Sal Cinquemani called "Fallen Fruit" the "centerpiece" of Solar Power, asserting that the song "addresses the climate crisis with an almost whimsical sense of wonder, as Lorde softly chastises past generations for allowing such destruction".

A Pitchfork review from Anna Gaca called "Fallen Fruit" one of two "incantatory interludes" on Solar Power that are "inspired, if we can call it that, by pending environmental collapse", with the other track being "Leader of a New Regime". In Beats Per Minute, Rob Hakimian said that the song was "passing comment on our contributions to global warming", calling it "jaunty". Writing for The Skinny, Joe Goggins stated that "Fallen Fruit" was "quietly undulating" and "a stark elegy for the planet before the climate crisis".

== Music video ==
A music video for "Fallen Fruit" was released on 2 November 2021, set in the same location as the video for "Solar Power" and directed by Joel Kefali and Lorde. Writing of the connection between the two videos, Lorde said that "in the 'Solar Power' video, you were introduced to the island as a lush paradise — glistening water, blue skies, not a grain of sand out of place (barring that pesky beach trash...). Cut to: humans doing as they do, getting greedy, treating the land with disrespect and stripping it of its beauty".

For Uproxx, Carolyn Droke said that the video "explores the repercussions of humans' obsession with consumption", noting how, unlike the "Solar Power" video which was set in the day, the "Fallen Fruit" video "constantly flips from daytime to nighttime, when everything has been destroyed and set on fire". Billboard writer Heran Mamo stated that "the video poignantly reminds us of the fragility of life on Earth, with the Garden of Eden metaphor referenced in the song's title leading to Lorde's main point that our greatest sin would be to leave our home uninhabitable for generations to come after us".

== Live performances ==
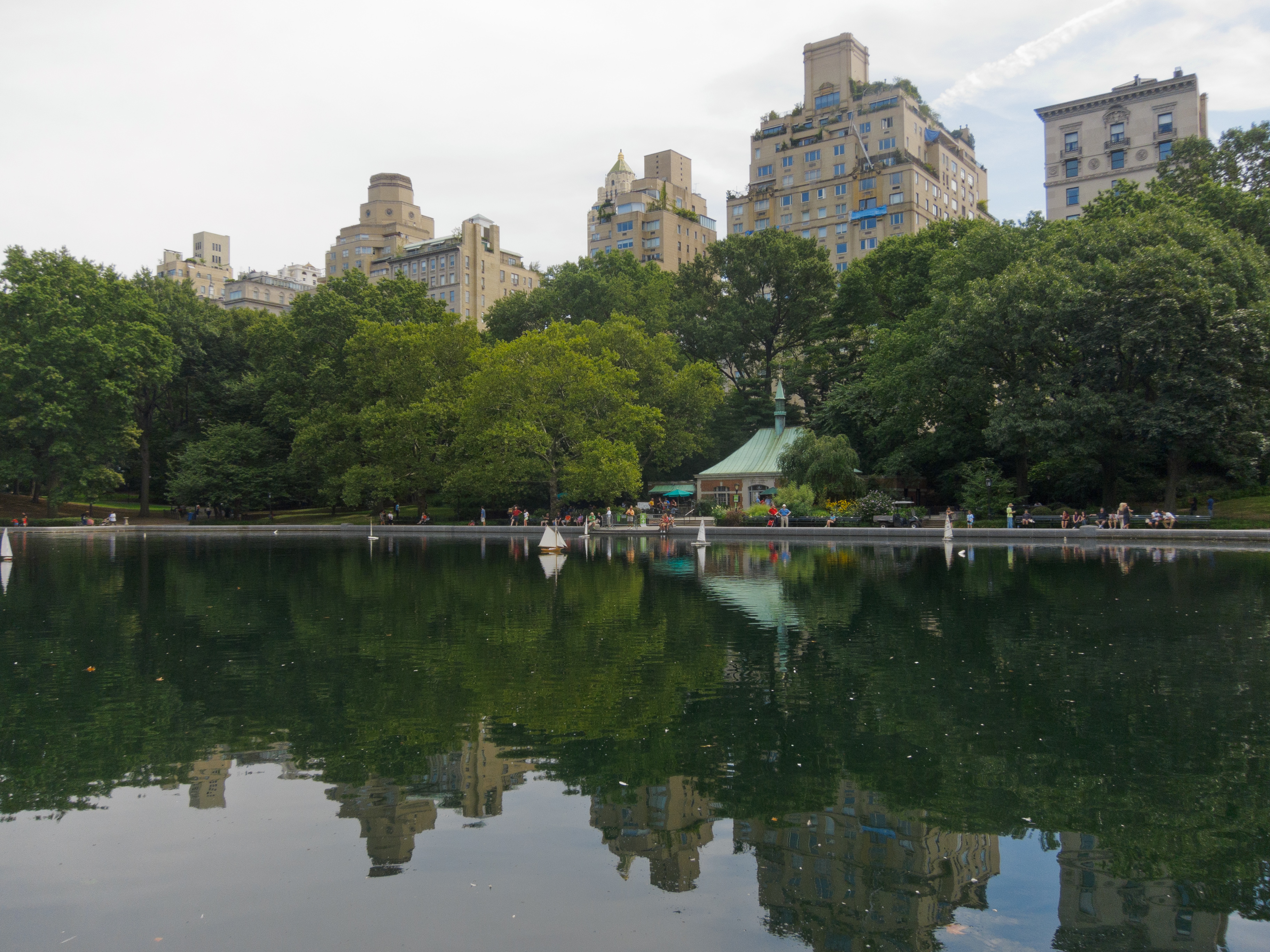
Lorde's debut performance of "Fallen Fruit" took place in Central Park (pictured).

Lorde debuted "Fallen Fruit" on 20 August 2022 when she appeared on Good Morning America. The performance took place at SummerStage in Central Park, New York City, which Good Morning America stated was the first to occur at that venue in two years. Lorde also performed the song on 27 August 2022 on The Late Late Show with James Corden, as part of a week-long residency on the show. "Fallen Fruit" is fifth on the setlist for the Solar Power Tour (2022)

== Credits and personnel ==
Credits adapted from Tidal.

- Lorde – vocals, songwriting, production
- Jack Antonoff – songwriting, production, 12-string acoustic guitar, bass, electric 6-string guitar, keyboards, Mellotron, percussion, piano, Wurlitzer electronic piano, mixing, programming
- Phoebe Bridgers – background vocals
- Clairo – background vocals
- Lawrence Arabia – background vocals
- Marlon Williams – background vocals
- Evan Smith – flute, saxophone
- Malay – bass
- Laura Sisk – mixing
- Chris Gehringer – mastering
- Will Quinnell – mastering

== Charts ==
Weekly chart positions for "Fallen Fruit"
Chart (2021)	Peak position
New Zealand Artist Singles (RMNZ)	8
US Hot Rock & Alternative Songs (Billboard)	31

== Hua Pirau / Fallen Fruit ==
"Hua Pirau / Fallen Fruit"

Song by Lorde

from the EP Te Ao Mārama
- Language: Māori
- Genre: Waiata
- Length: 4:00
- Label: Universal
- Songwriters: Ella Yelich O'Connor; Jack Antonoff
- Producers: Lorde; Jack Antonoff

Lyric video
- "Hua Pirau / Fallen Fruit" on YouTube

"Hua Pirau / Fallen Fruit" is a song recorded by New Zealand singer-songwriter Lorde. It is the fourth track from her Te Ao Mārama EP, and is performed fully in the Māori language. The song was translated into Māori by Tīmoti Kāretu, and features vocals from Hinewehi Mohi, Hēmi Kelly, Bic Runga, and Hana Mereraiha.
