= Mood Ring (Lorde song) =

2021 single by Lorde

Single by Lorde

from the album Solar Power
- Released: 18 August 2021
- Recorded: 2020–21
- Studio: Sound City Studios (Los Angeles, CA)
- Genre: Pop
- Length: 3:45
- Label: Universal
- Songwriters: Ella Yelich-O'Connor; Jack Antonoff
- Producers: Lorde; Jack Antonoff

Lorde singles chronology
"Stoned at the Nail Salon" (2021)	"Mood Ring" (2021)	"Fallen Fruit" (2021)

Music video
- "Mood Ring" on YouTube

"Mood Ring" is a song by New Zealand singer-songwriter Lorde. The song was released through Universal Music New Zealand on 18 August 2021, as the third single from her third studio album, Solar Power. "Mood Ring" was written and produced by Lorde and Jack Antonoff.

== Background ==
The track listing for New Zealand singer-songwriter Lorde's third studio album Solar Power was announced on 21 June 2021, with "Mood Ring" as the album's eleventh track. On 16 August 2021, Lorde's website was updated with a mood ring chart. The same day, Lorde announced the release of "Mood Ring" on 18 August 2021, via her website. In a statement, Lorde said the following of "Mood Ring":

This is a song I am very excited about, it’s so much fun to me. Obviously when making this album I did a deep-dive into ’60s, Flower Child culture. I wanted to understand the commune life, dropping out from society and trying to start again. That really resonated to me when writing this album. One thing that occurred to me as a major parallel between that time and our time is our wellness culture and our culture of spirituality, pseudo-spirituality, wellness, pseudo-wellness. Things like eating a macro-biotic vegan diet or burning sage, keeping crystals, reading tarot cards or your horoscope. These were all things that they were dabbling in back then, and that me and my girlfriends are dabbling in today. I was like “I think there’s a pop song in here.” So this is kind of my extremely satirical look at all of those vibes.

— Lorde

== Critical reception ==
Writing for Billboard, Hannah Dailey called the song a "airy, guitar-led track", which "both lightly mocks the promotion of a phony holistic lifestyle and sympathizes with people who find comfort in that same lifestyle". Claire Shaffer of Rolling Stone called "Mood Ring" a "mellow acoustic track with only the faintest hint of percussion", sonically comparing it to the previously released "Solar Power" and "Stoned at the Nail Salon". In a negative review, Pitchfork described it as "less exciting than hoped for" and said that Lorde's critique of wellness culture seemed "pretty trite for someone who's previously been so ahead of the curve".

== Music video ==
A music video for the song, directed by Lorde and Joel Kefali, was released at 7AM NZDT on 18 August 2021. Claire Shaffer of Rolling Stone described the video as "a continuation of her "Solar Power" visual", where "[Lorde], now with bleached-blonde hair, leads a cult-like ceremony under a sunlit tent, surrounded by her followers in matching jade green outfits". Vulture writer Zoe Haylock stated that the video displays Lorde "using crystals, vitamins, sun salutations, and more to 'get well from the inside.'"

== Track listing ==
Streaming

1. "Mood Ring" – 3:45
2. "Stoned at the Nail Salon" – 4:26
3. "Solar Power" – 3:12

== Credits and personnel ==
Credits adapted from Tidal.

- Lorde – vocals, songwriting, production
- Jack Antonoff – songwriting, production, bass, acoustic guitar, electric 6-string, keyboards, programming
- Matt Chamberlain – drums, programming
- Phoebe Bridgers – background vocals
- Clairo – background vocals
- Lawrence Arabia – background vocals
- Marlon Williams – background vocals
- Mark "Spike" Stent – mixing
- Chris Gehringer – mastering engineer
- Will Quinnell – mastering

== Charts ==
Chart performance for "Mood Ring"
Chart (2021)	Peak position
Australia (ARIA)	29
Canada Hot 100 (Billboard)	76
Global 200 (Billboard)	93
Hungary (Single Top 40)	29
Ireland (IRMA)	44
New Zealand (Recorded Music NZ)	10
Portugal (AFP)	141
Sweden Heatseeker (Sverigetopplistan)	16
UK Singles (OCC)	48
US Bubbling Under Hot 100 (Billboard)	18
US Hot Rock & Alternative Songs (Billboard)	11

== Certifications ==
Certifications for "Mood Ring"
Region	Certification	Certified units/sales
Australia (ARIA)	Gold	35,000^{‡}
Brazil (Pro-Música Brasil)	Gold	20,000^{‡}
New Zealand (RMNZ)	Gold	15,000^{‡}
^{‡} Sales+streaming figures based on certification alone.

== Release history ==
Region	Date	Format(s)	Label(s)	Ref.
Various	August 18, 2021	Digital download; streaming	Universal	
Italy	August 27, 2021	Contemporary hit radio	Universal	
United States	September 27, 2021	Adult alternative radio	Lava; Republic	
