= Te Ao Mārama (EP) =

EP by Lorde
- Released: 9 September 2021
- Length: 21:57
- Language: Māori
- Label: Universal
- Producer: Lorde; Jack Antonoff; Malay

Lorde chronology
| Solar Power (2021) | Te Ao Mārama (2021) | Virgin (2025) |

Te Ao Mārama (Māori for "world of light") is the second extended play by New Zealand singer-songwriter Lorde. It was released on 9 September 2021, through Universal Music New Zealand. It consists of five songs from Lorde's third studio album, Solar Power, re-written and recorded in the Māori language.

== Background and lyrics ==
After the release of her third studio album Solar Power, New Zealand singer-songwriter Lorde approached Marion and Sandra Wihongi, whom she called the project's "unsung heroes", with the idea of creating an extended play. Lorde told Leonie Hayden of The Spinoff that the two Wihongi sisters "put together a bit of a document for me, just sort of helping me understand what would be right".

Lorde had little knowledge of the Māori language, explaining that "it wasn't something that was a big part of [her] life, and it was something that [she] had sort of sadness and a little bit of guilt around". Te Ao Mārama translates to "world of light" in Māori, which is both a reference to the title of Solar Power, and "mai te pō ki te ao mārama", which is a Māori phrase as part of the creation narrative that symbolises the transformation from night to enlightened world.

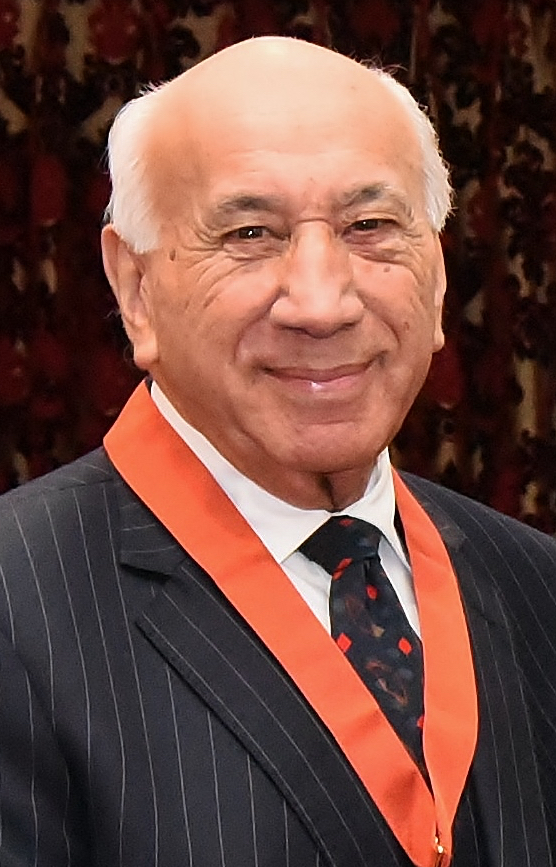
Tīmoti Kāretu (pictured) helped in the creation of Te Ao Mārama.

Hinewehi Mohi (Ngāti Kahungunu, Ngāi Tūhoe) assisted in the creation of Te Ao Mārama, bringing Tīmoti Kāretu, Hana Mereraiha, and Hēmi Kelly onto the project. Mohi also performs vocals on "Hua Pirau / Fallen Fruit". Three of the songs − "Te Ara Tika / The Path", "Mata Kohore / Stoned at the Nail Salon", and "Hine-i-te-Awatea / Oceanic Feeling" − were translated into Māori by Mereraiha. Mereraiha also instructed Lorde on pronunciation of Māori. The translations of the songs were created by the translators holding discussions with Lorde as to what the songs meant to her personally, as well as what memories and images the songs invoked, and re-interpreting this from a Māori point of view.

Lorde acknowledged her status as a white person in making the EP, saying "however you want to interpret me wanting to engage with our Indigenous culture, that's fair enough. I totally accept that, because it is really complicated. This isn't something where I have both feet on the ground – I am a little bit out of my depth, and I'm the first to admit that, and I'm opening myself up to any response to this."

Lorde explained that the Māori concept of kaitiakitanga, which loosely translates to guardianship, contributed to her understanding of Te Ao Mārama, saying "I started writing about jumping off Bulli Point, which was something that my dad had done, his grandfather had done, and that I hope my children will do. That feeling of being in a body of water that you have a generational connection to. I was writing an album about the spiritual power of the natural world, specifically in the context of where we're from, and I realised; oh, there's a word for this – it's kaitiakitanga."

=== Artwork ===
The cover artwork for Te Ao Mārama is a recoloured version of Serene by Rei Hamon (Ngāti Kahungunu, Ngāti Porou, Te Aitanga-a-Māhaki), a New Zealand artist.

== Songs ==
The EP opens with "Te Ara Tika / The Path", which Lorde called her "favourite one" from the EP. It is followed up by the title track, "Te Ao Mārama / Solar Power", which was translated to Māori by Hēmi Kelly. Kelly said of the song, "I love the warmth of summer so it was easy for me to connect with the lyrics". Kelly noted the song's lyrical themes of "leaving your worries behind and moving into a positive space", and connected it to Māori creation narratives "of moving from darkness, te pō, into the world of light, te ao mārama".

The third track is "Mata Kohore / Stoned at the Nail Salon". The song's translator, Hana Mereraiha, explained of the Māori title that "'Mata Kohore' means sort of red eyes but also blurry-eyes, so when you're not quite seeing clearly – maybe you're over-thinking, or not seeing things so clearly". It is followed by "Hua Pirau / Fallen Fruit", which was translated by Tīmoti Kāretu. Lorde said that Hua Pirau translates to "fruit that is rotten, or fruit that is fermented". She also explained that there was difficulty in translating some of the metaphors of the song into Māori, "because the song is speaking to an older generation about what they have left us with, in terms of fucking up our planet, basically".

The final track on Te Ao Mārama is "Hine-i-te-Awatea / Oceanic Feeling", translated by Mereraiha. Of the title, Lorde said "Hine-i-te-Awatea is the maiden of the dawn – goddess of new beginnings. She's the daughter of the sun. I welcome her at the end of the song."

== Release ==
All proceeds from the release of the EP were donated to two New Zealand charities, Forest and Bird and Te Hua Kawariki Charitable Trust. The EP was released on 9 September 2021, four days before Te Wiki o te Reo Māori / Māori Language Week.

== Critical reception ==
Te Ao Mārama was met with a range of responses including the artist's platform providing a wider audience for te reo Māori / the Māori language, tokenism, and prompted discussion amongst ngā tangata Māori / Māori people around access to their language and the impact of colonisation on Māori language learners. In The Guardian, University of Otago lecturer Morgan Godfery (Te Pahipoto, Samoa) wrote that "like every other Māori person without their ancestral language, I yearn for te reo rangatira (the Māori language). I want the past it grants access to, and the shape it confers on my future and my partner's future and our child's future". Godfrey continued by saying that "it's vital that Pākehā speak it alongside us", and that "for that reason alone", Te Ao Mārama was a "pop culture landmark we should welcome".

Godfery noted concerns of tokenism, but ultimately concluded by remarking that "English is the first global language", and that "if the Māori language is to survive against it – and the forecasts are grim – we must allow non-Māori to speak and sing it. Children need a pop culture and a social media that speaks Māori. Lorde contributed to that, and under the direction and supervision of some of our greatest language champions. As a second language speaker I recognise that as a public good."

Jack Gray, a Māori dance performer and choreographer, wrote in The Big Idea that Te Ao Mārama was "tokenism in full force". Gray stated that "Lorde gets to manifest a vision that isn't hers. It's a collaboration in which her celebrity-tanga is the focal point. She will garner support from the masses. This album will cross boundaries and will gain new Māori listeners. People will justify her trying. Because a Pākeha who tries is far more deserving of support than a Māori who tries. Lorde will be understandably shitting her pants now because all she has to do is deliver the content that was spun for her. But she won't ever - ever - have to take anything on of the burden of Māoridom."

== Track listing ==
Te Ao Mārama track listing
| No. | Title | Writer(s) | Producer(s) | Length |
|---|---|---|---|---|
| 1. | "Te Ara Tika / The Path" | Ella Yelich-O'Connor | Lorde; Jack Antonoff; Malay | 3:40 |
| 2. | "Te Ao Mārama / Solar Power" | Yelich-O'Connor; Antonoff | Lorde; Antonoff; Malay | 3:11 |
| 3. | "Mata Kohore / Stoned at the Nail Salon" | Yelich-O'Connor; Antonoff | Lorde; Antonoff | 4:27 |
| 4. | "Hua Pirau / Fallen Fruit" | Yelich-O'Connor; Antonoff | Lorde; Antonoff | 4:00 |
| 5. | "Hine-i-te-Awatea / Oceanic Feeling" | Yelich-O'Connor | Lorde; Antonoff | 6:39 |
| Total length: | | | | 21:57 |

== Personnel ==
Musicians

- Lorde – vocals (all tracks), background vocals (4), DX7 (3)
- Jack Antonoff – bass, electric guitar (all tracks); acoustic guitar, drums, keyboards, percussion, programming (1, 2, 4, 5); Mellotron (1, 3, 4, 5), piano (1, 3, 4), Wurlitzer electric piano (1, 4), 12-string acoustic guitar (2, 4)
- Bic Runga – background vocals (1, 3, 5)
- Marlon Williams – background vocals (1, 3, 5)
- Matt Chamberlain – drums (1, 2, 5), programming (2)
- Evan Smith – flute, saxophone (1, 4, 5)
- Malay – bass (1, 4)
- Cole Kamen-Green – trumpet (2)
- Hana Mereraiha – background vocals (4, 5)
- Hinewehi Mohi – background vocals (4)
- Hēmi Kelly – background vocals (4, 5)

Technical

- Chris Gehringer – mastering
- Mark "Spike" Stent – mixing (1, 2, 5)
- Jack Antonoff – mixing (3, 4)
- Laura Sisk – mixing (3, 4)
- Will Quinnell – mastering assistance
- Matt Wolach – mixing assistance (1, 2, 5)

== Charts ==
Chart performance for Te Ao Mārama
| Chart (2021) | Peak position |
|---|---|
| New Zealand Albums (RMNZ) | 4 |
| New Zealand Artist Albums (RMNZ) | 1 |
| US Top Current Album Sales (Billboard) | 70 |
| US World Albums (Billboard) | 15 |

== Release history ==
Release dates and formats for Te Ao Mārama
| Region | Date | Format | Label | Ref. |
|---|---|---|---|---|
| Various | 9 September 2021 | Digital download; streaming | Universal Music New Zealand | |
| Various | 22 June 2022 | Vinyl | Universal Music New Zealand | |
