= Solar Power (album) =

- Standard cover

Studio album by Lorde
- Released: 20 August 2021
- Recorded: 2019–2021
- Studios: Electric Lady (New York); Conway (Los Angeles); Roundhead (Auckland); Rough Customer (Brooklyn)
- Genres: Indie folk; folk pop; psychedelic pop; psychedelic folk
- Length: 43:09
- Label: Universal New Zealand
- Producers: Lorde; Jack Antonoff; Malay

Lorde chronology
Melodrama (2017)	Solar Power (2021)	Te Ao Mārama (2021)

Singles from Solar Power
- 1. "Solar Power" Released: 11 June 2021; 2. "Stoned at the Nail Salon" Released: 22 July 2021; 3. "Mood Ring" Released: 18 August 2021; 4. "Fallen Fruit" Released: 2 November 2021; 5. "Secrets from a Girl (Who's Seen It All)" Released: 25 March 2022

Solar Power is the third studio album by New Zealand singer-songwriter Lorde. It was released on 20 August 2021 by Universal. Inspired by the death of her Golden Retriever mix dog and her visit to Antarctica in 2019, the album was written with producer Jack Antonoff to capture themes of solipsism and summer escapism. It mainly focuses on Lorde's leisure time in her homeland, New Zealand, while simultaneously expressing her disdain for fame and celebrity culture.

Classified by Lorde as her "weed album", Solar Power is a psychedelic pop and indie folk effort built around acoustic guitar arrangements, marking a departure from the electronic-based music of her previous works. It was met by polarised reviews from music critics, who commended Lorde's matured vocals, but were divided over its songwriting and production. Lorde later described the response to the record as "really confounding" and "painful". The album was led by its lead single and title track, "Solar Power", followed by "Stoned at the Nail Salon", "Mood Ring", and "Fallen Fruit".

Commercially, Solar Power reached number one in Australia and New Zealand, and charted inside the top ten in various countries. Lorde opted against manufacturing CDs for environmental reasons, releasing Solar Power to digital music platforms, streaming services, and as vinyl LPs only. A Māori-language EP, titled Te Ao Mārama, was released on 9 September 2021 as a companion project to Solar Power. It consists of Māori versions of five tracks from the album. To promote the album, Lorde embarked on her third concert tour, the Solar Power Tour.

== Background and recording ==
After concluding the North American leg of the Melodrama World Tour in May 2018, Lorde cleared out all her social media, leaving only three Instagram pictures and two tweets visible on her accounts. In November 2018, Lorde revealed in an email sent to fans via her newsletter subscription that she started learning how to play the piano and was outlining ideas for her forthcoming record. The singer made her first public performance since the conclusion of her tour in April 2019 at a benefit concert for victims of the Christchurch mosque shootings, which had occurred the previous month. Later that year, Lorde disclosed that she was indefinitely postponing work on her album due to the death of her dog Pearl, a retriever mix, after he suffered two cardiac arrests.

The singer expressed having been interested in visiting Antarctica since she was a child. When she was 16, the CEO of government agency Antarctica New Zealand tried to convince Lorde to visit the area. In February 2019, Lorde visited Scott Base, Antarctica for five days with the help of the government agency. To prepare for the harsh weather conditions, the singer was required to receive vaccinations, pass medical exams, and wear ECW gear before boarding an army jet. While visiting, the singer shadowed scientists, observed orcas, surveyed Adélie penguins, and performed weather recordings. She states that the abrupt transition from leaving the "beach and tans" in New Zealand summer to a "hostile, cold environment and back to the beach", provided influence in developing the themes of the album. The title of the album came to her as she returned home to New Zealand.

In March 2020, Australian radio station Triple J revealed the ranking spot of her 2013 song "Royals" on their Hottest 100 of the Decade contest. Lorde called in from the office of her New Zealand record label and revealed that "bits and pieces" of her upcoming album were "starting to take a very exciting shape". Two months later, the singer announced via her subscription newsletter that she was finishing Solar Power, still untitled at the time, and that she kept in communication with American producer Jack Antonoff, who assisted in the songwriting and production of her previous record. In July 2020, American producer Malay, who co-produced three songs on her last album, revealed to Reverb that he flew frequently to New Zealand to work with Lorde before the COVID-19 pandemic. Unlike their production sessions on Melodrama, Malay and the singer "started from zero", which he described as "really unique and fun".

== Writing and production ==
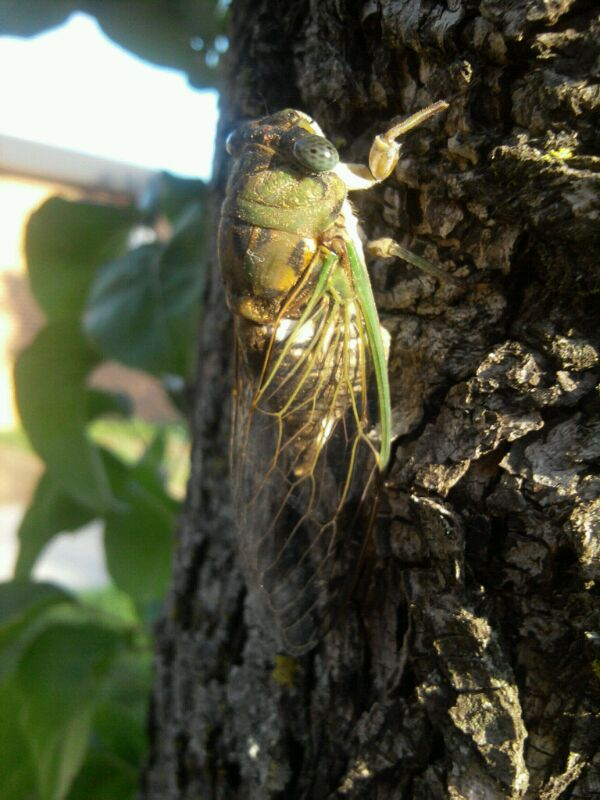
Lorde recorded cicadas on her phone to incorporate nature in the album's production.

During a Beats 1 interview with New Zealand radio DJ Zane Lowe in November 2017, Lorde expressed her desire to improve her production and engineering skills within the following two years, and write and produce an entire record by herself within the next five years. However, after a tumultuous tour schedule and writing an "intense album", Lorde said she "needed to just go and slow down at home". By early 2019, the singer transitioned into domestic life, where she took an interest in cooking, gardening, swimming and walking. Lorde also began to reconnect with her family and friends in New Zealand, who she missed after experiencing homesickness while on tour. This provided her with inspiration for the lyrical content of the album, where she opted to write about the ordinary aspects of her life.

Solar Power was described by Lorde as a "celebration of the natural world." She compared her experience spending time outdoors and in the sun as seeing God, though not a Christian God, but "something higher". Furthermore, in an interview with Sean Evans for Hot Ones, the singer called Solar Power a sun worship album. While writing the album, Lorde visualized a utopia which she dubbed the "Island". This allowed her to take a different songwriting and intellectual perspective which culminated in her searching for "broader and clearer" viewpoints than her own. She named Canadian singer Joni Mitchell as an influence in writing from this approach. In doing so, Lorde began to observe the changing of the seasons, and compared this to the cycle of life and death. Initially conceived as an acid record, the singer decided to use cannabis to write material after a negative experience with the drug.

Lorde cites How to Do Nothing, a 2019 self-help book by American writer Jenny Odell, as a source of inspiration when outlining concepts for Solar Power. She also found interest in the 1960s counterculture movement and flower child movement, comparing the philosophical, political, and environmental similarities between people from that era and her generation. Her interest in disconnecting from social media led her to communicate with a programmer who blocked websites in the "source code of her devices." This included blocking access to social media applications and web browsers on her phone and YouTube on her laptop and setting her phone to grayscale to combat her phone addiction. She also began to reassess her relationship with fame and its consequences.

During production stages, Lorde envisioned creating an album that combined 1960s and 1970s folk and early noughties bubblegum pop music. Her interest in nature translated to the music, which feature sound recordings of cicadas in the majority of the album. She took a liking to the guitar-based music of British group S Club 7, American girl group TLC, Australian-British singer Natalie Imbruglia, British singer Natasha Bedingfield, Canadian singer Nelly Furtado, and British girl group All Saints, as well as the folk rock music of the Mamas and the Papas, Fleetwood Mac, Eagles, and Crosby, Stills, Nash, and Young. In an interview with The Wall Street Journal, Lorde described the album as her summer at home and when assigning a specific time to the mood of the album, she said it was "like 2 to 5 p.m.—it's golden hour." Furthermore, she stated in a separate interview that she associated the color gold with the album. Songs were written on a whiteboard with colour-coded columns for each piece of the album and a long-running note was kept on the singer's phone and notebook to develop the album's ideas further.

== Artwork ==
Digitally altered cover artwork

The artwork for Solar Power was photographed by Lorde's friend Ophelia Mikkelson Jones on the beach, who laid on the sand, while she jumped mid-air over her. The photograph, captured from below with fisheye lens, shows the singer wearing a yellow rash guard and a swimsuit. The singer's body obstructs the sun view. In an interview with Stephen Colbert on his talk show, Lorde described the image as "a little hardcore" and "feral", but remarked that it also expressed joyfulness, innocence, freedom, and playfulness. In some markets, including mainland China, Hong Kong, Japan, Saudi Arabia, and the United Arab Emirates, Lorde's buttocks are censored by a bright sunlight lens flare.

Meagan Fredette of W noted that the artwork expressed her sexuality without succumbing to the male gaze. Similarly, Jenessa Williams, writing for The Forty-Five, wrote that the image posed a "distinct challenge to society", as it tests reactions to "risqué female-made expressions of bodily autonomy." Williams further compared the artwork to other albums, including Night Time, My Time (2013) by American singer Sky Ferreira, The Haunted Man (2012) by English singer Bat for Lashes, Vulnicura (2015) by Icelandic singer Björk, and Island Life (1985) by Jamaican singer Grace Jones as they present nude aspects of the female body but are used to "say something stronger."

== Composition ==
=== Music ===
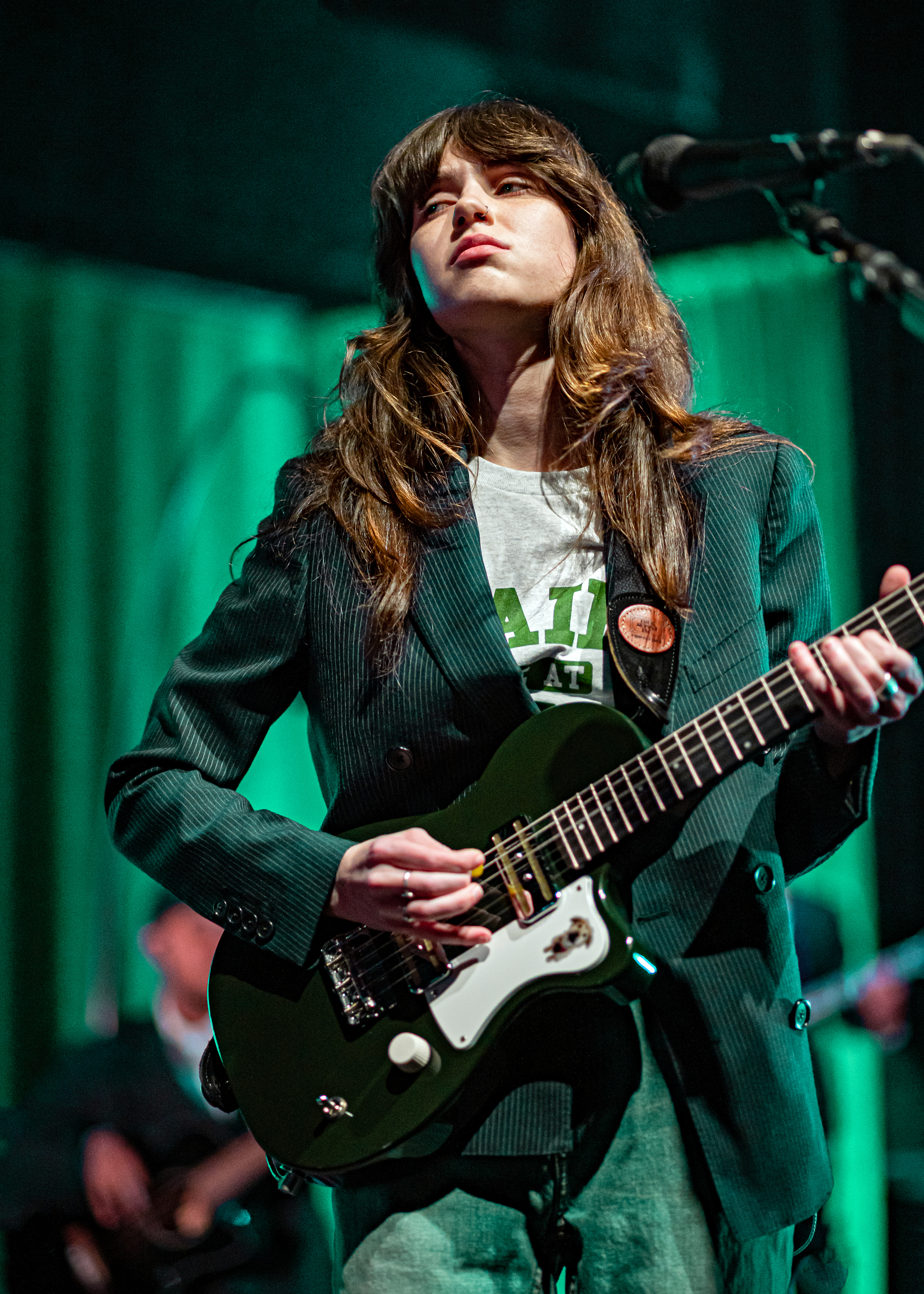
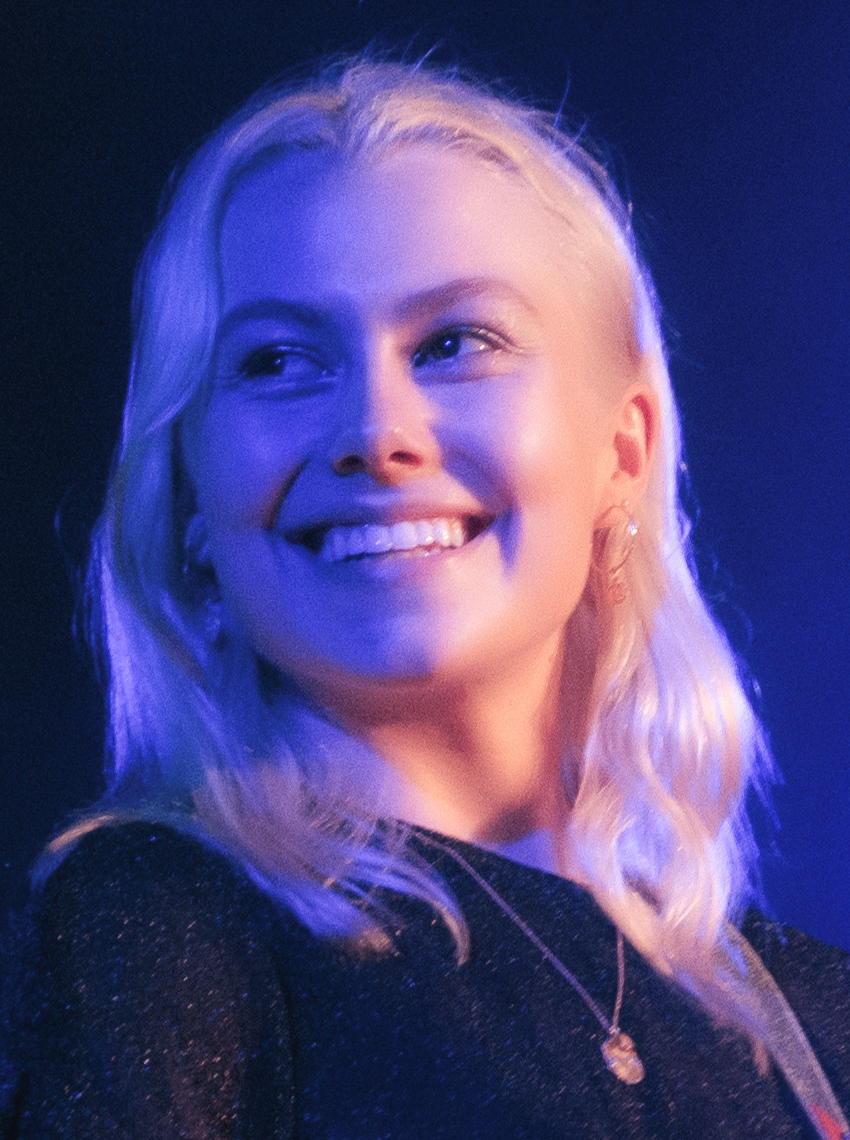
American singers Clairo (left) and Phoebe Bridgers (right) provide background vocals on the majority of the album.

Lorde employed a higher vocal range on Solar Power, a departure from the lower vocal register heard in her previous records. The Washington Post stated that her vocals were placed "more centrally in the mix", while Stereogum described them as "gorgeous", noting that they sounded different from her usual "breathy, heavy intonations" of her previous works. The singer opted for guest vocalists to complement her multitrack vocals on several tracks on the album, which she had previously avoided doing in her music. American singers Clairo and Phoebe Bridgers as well as New Zealand artists Marlon Williams and Lawrence Arabia contribute background vocals on the majority of the album.

Solar Power is built around guitars and drums, eschewing the 808, synthesiser and electronic-based music of Lorde's previous releases. Unlike Melodrama, which sought production from multiple producers, Lorde recruited only two producers to assist her with the production of the album: Antonoff and Malay. The three worked remotely in between sessions in New Zealand and the United States. The song structures on the album are unconventional and unstructured, incorporating guitar-based melodies and sparse percussion work. Despite the album's heavy guitar influences, Lorde remarked that only one 808 was employed during production stages. Several publications noted its minimalist acoustic production; its minimalist approach was compared to her earlier works. Solar Power has been described by critics as an indie folk, folk pop, psychedelic folk, and psychedelic pop record, with soft rock elements.

=== Lyrics ===
The album's lyrics primarily discuss escapism, retrospection, introspection, and solipsism. Lorde credits her dog Pearl and the 1974 non-fiction narrative book Pilgrim at Tinker Creek by American author Annie Dillard for her interest in reconnecting with nature. The book How to Do Nothing influenced the singer to detach from social media. Lorde states that Donald Trump's withdrawal from the Paris Agreement, Swedish activist Greta Thunberg's advocacy for climate action, and the recurring California wildfires also informed the record's climate crisis themes, though she denied that Solar Power was her "big climate change record", telling The Guardian: "I'm not a climate activist, I'm a pop star. I stoke the fire of a giant machine, spitting out emissions as I go. There is a lot I don't know." In an interview with Viva, she stated that she was content with making a "weird, sprawling album" that "admittedly asks more questions than it answers."

=== Songs ===
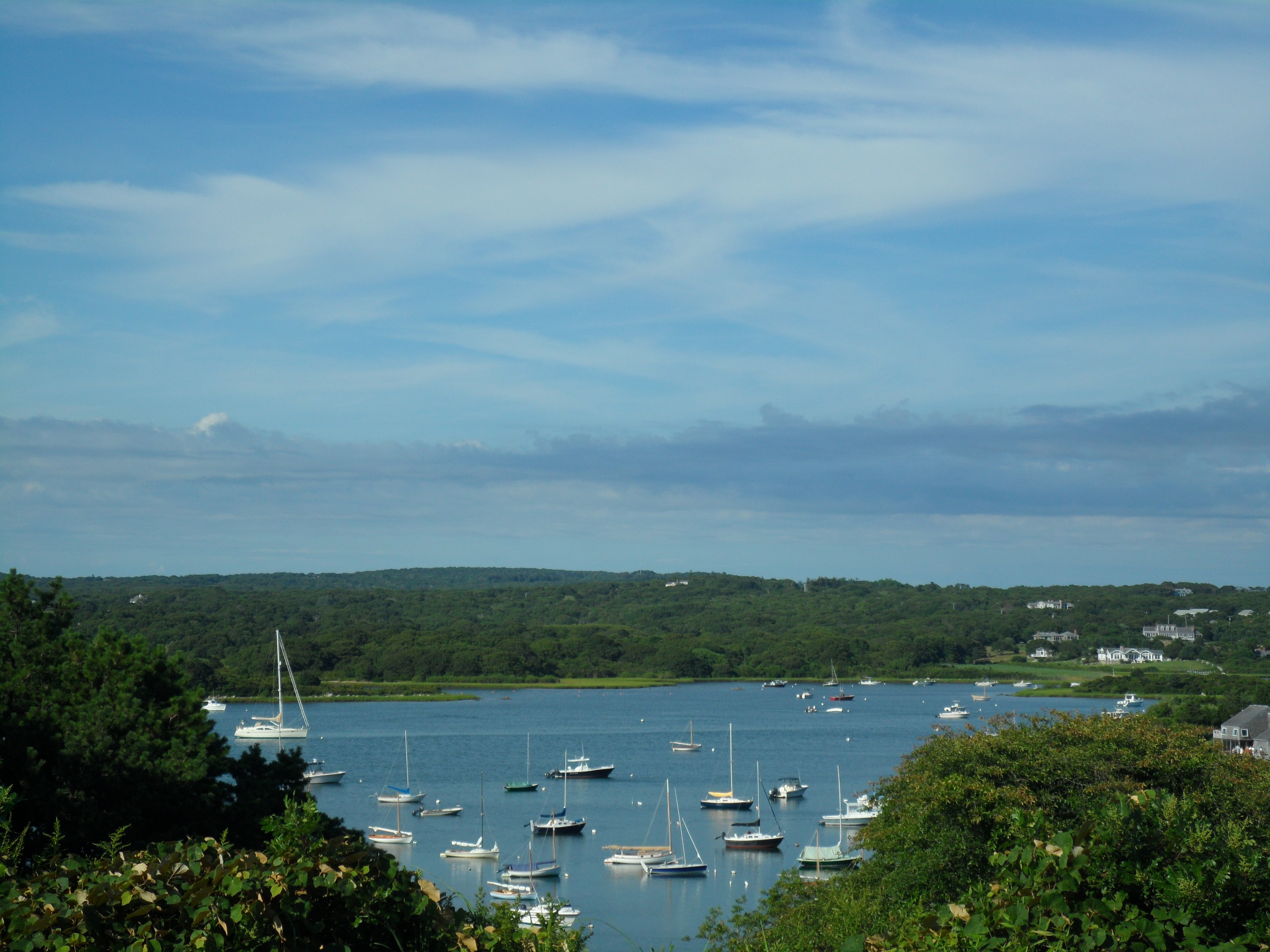
The title track was inspired after Lorde spent time swimming in Martha's Vineyard, Massachusetts.

The album's first track, "The Path", incorporates flute and drums in its production. The song addresses the pressures of fame and references her attendance at the 2016 Met Gala. Lorde wrote the title track after a day swimming with her friend Cazzie David at Larry David's home in Martha's Vineyard, Massachusetts. The track draws influences from the 1990 song "Loaded" by Scottish band Primal Scream and the 2000 song "Rock DJ" by English singer Robbie Williams. The third song, "California", begins with a reference to Lorde's 2013 song "Royals" being awarded the Grammy for Song of the Year by American musician Carole King in 2014. She was inspired to write the track after visiting the United States for the first time.

Lorde began writing the fourth track, "Stoned at the Nail Salon", six months after finishing the Melodrama World Tour, and recorded it in Antonoff's home studio. A contemplative folk ballad, the song was borne out of insecure feelings of fading into irrelevance and becoming out of touch with pop culture." Track five on the album, "Fallen Fruit", was described by critics as a protest song, serving as a condemnation for prior generations over their inaction on climate change. It is also the only song on the album to feature an 808 drum machine in its production. "Secrets from a Girl (Who's Seen It All)" was written as self-advice to a past version of oneself. Lorde considers the track to be a response to her 2013 song "Ribs", with the former reversing the primary chords of the latter's verses and the lyrics containing future wisdom wrought from lived experience. She credits British group Eurythmics and Swedish artist Robyn as influences on the track; the latter contributes a spoken word interlude at the end of the song.

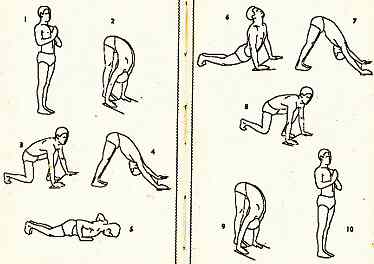
"Mood Ring" mentions practices including Sun Salutations (pictured).

Solar Power's B-side drops significantly in tempo, starting with "The Man with the Axe", a ballad that Lorde initially conceived as a poem. She sampled applause from a YouTube video of her performance at the 2018 Corona Capital in Mexico in the song. The following track, "Dominoes", was recorded at Electric Lady Studios with the doors open, which contributed non-diegetic and unintended sounds from outside to the final production, including audible police sirens. The song has been described as a critique on the tropes of men seeking wellness, gardening, and utopia to hide their misogonistic and toxic nature, with the unnamed man referenced in the lyrics of the song to be one such representation.

"Big Star" is a tribute to Lorde's dog, Pearl, whose death in late 2019 left the singer experiencing grief. Lorde began writing it on the piano with Pearl at her side. The penultimate track, "Mood Ring", is a critique of wellness culture and the contrived methods of spiritual connectivity in the digital world. A satire of material pursuits for emotional clarity, the lyrics contain references to popular New Age pseudoscience practices, including crystal therapy, Sun Salutations, sage-burning, meditation, and astrology. The production of the track was compared to early 2000s music. The final track, "Oceanic Feeling", discusses Lorde's ruminations on her homeland, her loved ones, time perception, and a future family of her own. In the song's concluding lines, Lorde alludes to "The Love Song of J. Alfred Prufrock", a 1915 poem published by writer T.S. Eliot. Its title comes from Romain Rolland's concept of a feeling of oneness with the world.

== Release and promotion ==
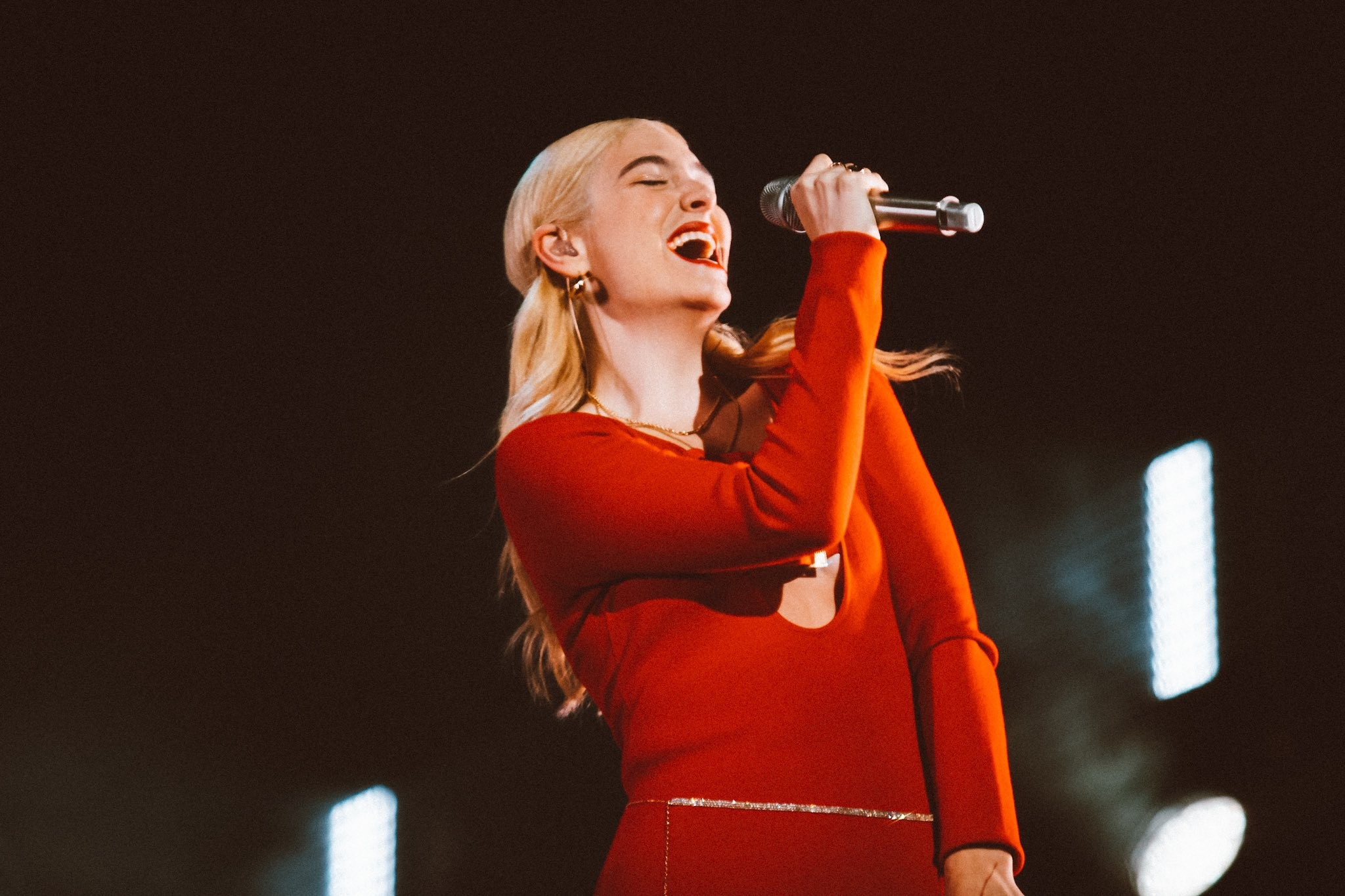
Lorde performing on her Solar Power Tour at the Primavera Sound of São Paulo, November 2022

Lorde teased new music in 2021 as a gift to fans in an October 2020 Instagram Stories post if they voted in New Zealand's general election as well as the cannabis and euthanasia referendums. The following month, she announced the release of Going South (2021), a memoir documenting her visit to Antarctica in early 2019, stating that the book served as a precursor to her upcoming album. On 25 May 2021, Lorde was announced as a headliner for the 2022 Primavera Sound music festival, with the festival's website teasing a new album from the singer.

On 7 June 2021, the artwork and title of the album's title track leaked online. Lorde consequently teased its release on her website alongside a message stating: "Arriving in 2021... Patience is a virtue." Following further leaks and an accidental release on select streaming services earlier than scheduled, Lorde released the song as the album's lead single on 11 June 2021, coinciding with the solar eclipse. Lorde further confirmed that her upcoming third album would also be titled Solar Power in her newsletter. On 21 June 2021, the track listing and release date for the album were revealed. Lorde performed the track for the first time from a rooftop at the Late Show with Stephen Colbert. The following month, Lorde released "Stoned at the Nail Salon" as the second single from Solar Power. She performed the song at Late Night with Seth Meyers and further promoted the album with an interview and Day Drinking segment on the show.

Lorde released "Mood Ring" as the third single from the album on 18 August 2021. To promote the album, the singer was scheduled to perform at the 2021 MTV Video Music Awards; however, due to a "change in production elements", Lorde cancelled her performance. She further explained that the "many-bodied intimate dance performance" she had conceived would not be feasible with current COVID-19 safety protocols in place. "Fallen Fruit" was released as the fourth and final single from the album, coinciding with the official release of the album's bonus tracks, "Helen of Troy" and "Hold No Grudge". To promote Solar Power, Lorde embarked on a world tour, with several opening acts, including Remi Wolf, Williams, Japanese Breakfast, and Muna. The tour began on 3 April 2022 in Nashville, United States and concluded in Hastings, New Zealand on 21 April 2023.

=== Lack of CD release ===
Despite versions of her two previous albums existing for the medium, Lorde did not manufacture jewel case CD releases for Solar Power. Her decision to opt for a disc-less alternative was influenced by her carbon footprint following her last album cycle. She stated that she did not want to manufacture something that would "end up in a landfill in 2 years". Instead, she released an eco-friendly "music box" with handwritten notes, merchandise designs, bonus songs, additional mailing list updates, exclusive photographs, and other content. In addition, a download card was included for those seeking a physical manifestation of the album in addition to the digital release.

Lorde stated that, with the music box, she wanted to create an "environmentally kind, forward-thinking alternative to the CD" that would provide a high-quality download of the music similar to CD quality. Each box was made with no plastic, only paper and cardboard waste and is biodegradable within three months. Music trade publication Hits noted that the traditional CDs and their jewel cases are plastic materials that pollute the world's oceans. Vinyl LPs of the album were pressed, despite some researchers noting that vinyl records are also plastic products, and that although digital audio files appear virtual, they depend on "infrastructures of data storage, processing and transmission" that can lead to "potentially higher greenhouse gas emissions than the petrochemical plastics used in the production of more obviously physical formats".

== Critical reception ==
Professional ratings
Aggregate scores
Source	Rating
AnyDecentMusic?	6.7/10
Metacritic	69/100
Review scores
Source	Rating
AllMusic	3/5 stars
The A.V. Club	C
Clash	9/10
Entertainment Weekly	B
Evening Standard	2/5 stars
The Guardian	4/5 stars
The Independent	2/5 stars
NME	5/5 stars
Pitchfork	6.8/10
Rolling Stone	3.5/5 stars

Solar Power polarised music critics upon release. On Metacritic, which assigns a normalised rating out of 100 based on reviews from several publications, Solar Power received an average score of 69, based on 27 critics, indicating "generally favourable reviews".

Spencer Kornhaber of The Atlantic hailed the album as a "near masterpiece", admiring its social critique and simplistic instrumentation, while NME critic Rhian Daly called it a "dazzling hat-trick from a master of her craft". Mikael Wood of Los Angeles Times described Solar Power as a "low-key" album depicting Lorde's burdens of fame. Rolling Stone critic Brittany Spanos branded it a "smooth and beachy" record that has Lorde search for peace whilst meandering through her quarter-life crisis. Chris Willman of Variety found the album's lyrics compelling and its melodies concise.

Observing influences from the Doors and the Mamas & the Papas, Lucy Harbron of Clash underlined Solar Power was not a "fully sun-soaked album", but rather "sun-stroked", delivering her usual introspection under a "bright and hazy" tone. Lean Greenblatt of Entertainment Weekly said it had a subdued quality, delving into ease and "cool observation". Paste reviewer Matt Mitchell wrote that despite eschewing crossover appeal and hooks, the album is a "necessary record put together by someone hunting for inner peace".

Some reviews were more critical of Solar Power. Music journalist Alexis Petridis, writing for The Guardian, stated Solar Power sounds "undernourished" at its worst moments, but delivers overall. Sal Cinquemani of Slant appreciated its acoustic composition, but felt it lost momentum in the second half. Bobby Olivier of Spin complimented Lorde's deft songwriting, but labelled Solar Power her "least vital project". In her Consequence review, Abby Jones called it "pleasant background music", citing static production and clumsy pop culture references as its flaws, nevertheless.

The Sydney Morning Herald's Giselle Au-Nhien Nguyen noted that although Solar Power is "a perfectly fine record", it is an "anticlimax" that is lacking the "power and passion" of her past work. Stereogum critic James Rettig admired Lorde's voice and certain parts of the album which he thought were catchy, but thought the holistic concept was "muddy", lacking "deeper engagement", and sometimes "too laid back" and indistinct. Evening Standard's David Smyth, The Independent's Helen Brown, and David Cobbald of The Line of Best Fit all gave two star reviews: Smyth felt the songs on Solar Power "seem to take pride in their lack of ambition", Brown dismissed it as a disappointing, tuneless "collection of heat haze hippy noodlings", deficit of memorable hooks, while Cobbald deemed it Lorde's fall from grace.

Select year-end rankings for Solar Power
Critic/Organization	Rank	Published year
The Atlantic	6	2021
DIY	11	2021
Exclaim!	29	2021
Insider	2	2021
Mojo	56	2021
NME	19	2021
The Times	14	2021

== Commercial performance ==
Two weeks before its release on 20 August 2021, Solar Power rose to number one on the Apple Music pre-add chart for the week dated 30 July 2021 to 5 August 2021. In the United States, Solar Power entered the Billboard 200 chart at number five with 56,000 album-equivalent units moved, consisting of 34,000 album sales, and 22,000 units calculated from the 28.38 million on-demand streams the album earned in its opening week. Hits criticised Billboard for not counting the sales of the "Music Box" for the Billboard 200 chart; their own Hits Top 50 chart and the Rolling Stone Top 200 chart included the music box sales and placed Solar Power at number three on their charts. According to Billboard's long-standing rule, a box set must contain a physical copy of the album. It also reached number one on the Billboard Top Alternative Albums chart. Elsewhere, Solar Power debuted at number one on the ARIA Albums Chart and stayed on the chart for six weeks. It also reached number one in New Zealand and the top ten in 14 countries, including Canada and United Kingdom, reaching number two in the latter country's chart.

== Te Ao Mārama ==
On 9 September 2021, Lorde released a five-song companion EP to Solar Power titled Te Ao Mārama, meaning "World of Light" in Māori. The EP features five re-recordings of songs from Solar Power sung in the Māori language. Although Lorde herself is not Māori, she worked with Māori language experts, including Sir Tīmoti Kāretu, and collaborated with Kiwi singers Bic Runga and Marlon Williams to highlight "the long history of injustices that Maori language and culture has suffered and the inequities that persist today, specifically in New Zealand's music industry". Proceeds from the EP were donated to the charities Forest and Bird and Te Hua Kawariki Charitable Trust.

== Track listing ==
All the tracks are produced by Lorde and Jack Antonoff, except where noted

Solar Power – Standard edition
No.	Title	Lyrics	Music	Producer(s)	Length
1.	"The Path"	Ella Yelich-O'Connor	Yelich-O'Connor	Lorde; Jack Antonoff; Malay	3:41
2.	"Solar Power"	Yelich-O'Connor; Antonoff	Yelich-O'Connor; Antonoff	Lorde; Antonoff; Malay^{[a]}	3:13
3.	"California"	Yelich-O'Connor; Antonoff	Yelich-O'Connor; Antonoff		3:11
4.	"Stoned at the Nail Salon"	Yelich-O'Connor; Antonoff	Yelich-O'Connor; Antonoff		4:26
5.	"Fallen Fruit"	Yelich-O'Connor; Antonoff	Yelich-O'Connor; Antonoff		3:58
6.	"Secrets from a Girl (Who's Seen It All)"	Yelich-O'Connor; Antonoff; Robin Carlsson	Yelich-O'Connor; Antonoff		3:38
7.	"The Man with the Axe"	Yelich-O'Connor	Yelich-O'Connor; Malay	Lorde; Antonoff; Malay	4:15
8.	"Dominoes"	Yelich-O'Connor; Antonoff	Yelich-O'Connor; Antonoff		2:03
9.	"Big Star"	Yelich-O'Connor; Antonoff	Yelich-O'Connor; Antonoff		2:47
10.	"Leader of a New Regime"	Yelich-O'Connor	Yelich-O'Connor; Malay	Lorde; Antonoff; Malay	1:33
11.	"Mood Ring"	Yelich-O'Connor; Antonoff	Yelich-O'Connor; Antonoff		3:45
12.	"Oceanic Feeling"	Yelich-O'Connor	Yelich-O'Connor		6:39
Total length:					43:09

Solar Power – Apple Music edition (bonus track)
No.	Title	Director(s)	Length
13.	"Solar Power" (music video)	Lorde; Joel Kefali	3:13
Total length:			46:22

Solar Power – Deluxe edition (bonus tracks)
No.	Title	Lyrics	Music	Producer(s)	Length
13.	"Helen of Troy"	Yelich-O'Connor; Antonoff	Yelich-O'Connor; Antonoff		2:51
14.	"Hold No Grudge"	Yelich-O'Connor	Yelich-O'Connor; Malay	Lorde; Antonoff; Malay	4:28
Total length:					50:28

=== Notes ===
- ^a signifies an additional producer

== Personnel ==
Adapted from Tidal.

=== Musicians ===
- Lorde – vocals
- Jack Antonoff – bass, electric guitar (all tracks); acoustic guitar (1–6, 8, 11–14), drums (1–3, 6, 7, 11, 12), keyboards (1, 5–8, 11, 13), Mellotron (1, 4–6, 10), Farfisa (3, 4, 8, 10, 12), percussion (1, 2, 5, 12), piano (1, 3–5), programming (1, 5–8, 11, 12, 14), Wurlitzer electric piano (1, 5, 6), 12-string acoustic guitar (2, 5, 6)
- Clairo – background vocals (1, 2, 4, 5, 10, 11)
- Lawrence Arabia – background vocals (1, 4, 5, 10, 11)
- Marlon Williams – background vocals (1, 4, 5, 10–12)
- Phoebe Bridgers – background vocals (1, 2, 4, 5, 10, 11)
- Malay – bass (1, 5–7, 10, 13), acoustic guitar (7, 10, 14), programming (7), keyboards (10, 14), piano (14)
- Matt Chamberlain – drums (1–3, 6, 11–14), percussion (2, 12–14), programming (2, 11–14)
- Evan Smith – flute (1, 3, 5, 12–), saxophone (1–3, 5, 12–13), keyboards (13)
- Cole Kamen-Green – trumpet (2)
- Robyn – vocals (6)
- Bobby Hawk – violin (9, 10)

=== Technical ===
- Lorde – production
- Jack Antonoff – production (all tracks), mixing (4, 5, 7–10, 13)
- Malay – production (1, 7, 10, 14)
- Chris Gehringer – mastering
- Mark "Spike" Stent – mixing (1–3, 6, 11, 12, 14)
- Laura Sisk – mixing (4, 5, 7–10, 13)
- Will Quinnell – mastering assistance
- Matt Wolach – mixing assistance (2, 3, 5, 14)

== Charts ==
=== Weekly charts ===
Weekly chart performance for Solar Power
Chart (2021)	Peak position
Australian Albums (ARIA)	1
Austrian Albums (Ö3 Austria)	4
Belgian Albums (Ultratop Flanders)	3
Belgian Albums (Ultratop Wallonia)	7
Canadian Albums (Billboard)	6
Czech Albums (ČNS IFPI)	68
Danish Albums (Hitlisten)	10
Dutch Albums (Album Top 100)	3
Finnish Albums (Suomen virallinen lista)	22
French Albums (SNEP)	16
German Albums (Offizielle Top 100)	4
Greek Albums (IFPI)	72
Irish Albums (Official Charts)	4
Italian Albums (FIMI)	30
Lithuanian Albums (AGATA)	15
New Zealand Albums (RMNZ)	1
Norwegian Albums (VG-lista)	12
Portuguese Albums (AFP)	3
Scottish Albums (Official Charts)	2
Spanish Albums (Promusicae)	6
Swedish Albums (Sverigetopplistan)	18
Swiss Albums (Schweizer Hitparade)	2
UK Albums (Official Charts)	2
US Billboard 200	5
US Top Alternative Albums (Billboard)	1

=== Year-end charts ===
2021 year-end chart performance for Solar Power
Chart (2021)	Position
Australian Albums (ARIA)	95
New Zealand Albums (RMNZ)	34
US Top Current Album Sales (Billboard)	77

== Certifications and sales ==
Region	Certification	Certified units/sales
New Zealand (RMNZ)	Platinum	15,000^{‡}
United Kingdom (BPI)	Silver	60,000^{‡}
^{‡} Sales+streaming figures based on certification alone.

== Release history ==
Release dates and formats for Solar Power
Region	Date	Format(s)	Version	Label	Ref.
Various	20 August 2021	Digital download; streaming; vinyl	Standard	Universal Music New Zealand	
Various	20 August 2021	Box set; vinyl	Deluxe	Universal Music New Zealand	
Various	5 November 2021	Digital download; streaming	Deluxe	Universal Music New Zealand	

== See also ==
- List of 2021 albums (July–December)
- List of number-one albums from the 2020s (New Zealand)
- List of number-one albums of 2021 (Australia)
