= Stoned at the Nail Salon =

2021 single by Lorde

Single by Lorde

from the album Solar Power
- Released: 22 July 2021
- Studio: Sound City Studios (Los Angeles, CA)
- Genre: Psychedelic folk
- Length: 4:26
- Label: Universal
- Songwriters: Ella Yelich-O'Connor; Jack Antonoff
- Producers: Jack Antonoff; Lorde

Lorde singles chronology
"Solar Power" (2021)	"Stoned at the Nail Salon" (2021)	"Mood Ring" (2021)

Music video
- "Stoned at the Nail Salon" (Visualiser) on YouTube

"Stoned at the Nail Salon" is a song by New Zealand singer-songwriter Lorde, released through Universal Music New Zealand on 22 July 2021 as the second single from her third studio album, Solar Power. The song was written and produced by Lorde and Jack Antonoff, and features backing vocals from Phoebe Bridgers, Clairo, Marlon Williams, and Lawrence Arabia.

"Stoned at the Nail Salon" is a folk ballad where Lorde reflects about growing older and the passage of time. Critics were mixed on the song, with some praising what they saw as its "somber", "eloquent" and "graceful" qualities, while others were more negative towards its perceived "dull" and "aimless" nature. Critics also noted the difference between the song and "Solar Power", the single that immediately preceded it, connecting "Stoned at the Nail Salon" to her earlier albums Pure Heroine and Melodrama. Upon its release, "Stoned at the Nail Salon" appeared on record charts in Australia, Ireland, New Zealand, and the United Kingdom.

== Background ==
The tracklist for Lorde's third studio album, Solar Power, was announced on June 21, 2021, with "Stoned at the Nail Salon" as the album's fourth track. Lorde announced the release of "Stoned at the Nail Salon" as the second single from Solar Power on July 20, 2021 via her website, with the release date set for July 22, 2021.

Lorde described "Stoned at the Nail Salon" upon its release as a "rumination on getting older, settling into domesticity, and questioning if you've made the right decisions." In an interview with Zane Lowe of Apple Music, Lorde called the song "one of the quietest, most introspective, and internal moments on the record", explaining that "Stoned at the Nail Salon" was about the passage of time, which she thought was "a weird thing to even think about and be in conversation with".

== Composition ==
"Stoned at the Nail Salon"
The final chorus of "Stoned at the Nail Salon", featuring Lorde's vocals over a guitar accompaniment, and backing vocals from Phoebe Bridgers, Clairo, Marlon Williams, and Lawrence Arabia.

"Stoned at the Nail Salon" has been described as a folk song with an acoustic style. Laura Snapes from The Guardian described the track as a "prismatic folk song", where Lorde sings about how "all the beautiful girls will fade like the roses". The song is written in the key of D major and has a tempo of 60 beats per minute. Lorde's vocals range from D_{3} to B_{4}. Like Lorde's previous single, "Solar Power", "Stoned at the Nail Salon" features backing vocals from indie rock singers Phoebe Bridgers and Clairo, as well as Lawrence Arabia and Marlon Williams, the latter of whom were not on "Solar Power". The song features a "simple guitar accompaniment" courtesy of producer Jack Antonoff, who performed both acoustic and electric 6-string guitars on "Stoned at the Nail Salon".

== Critical reception ==
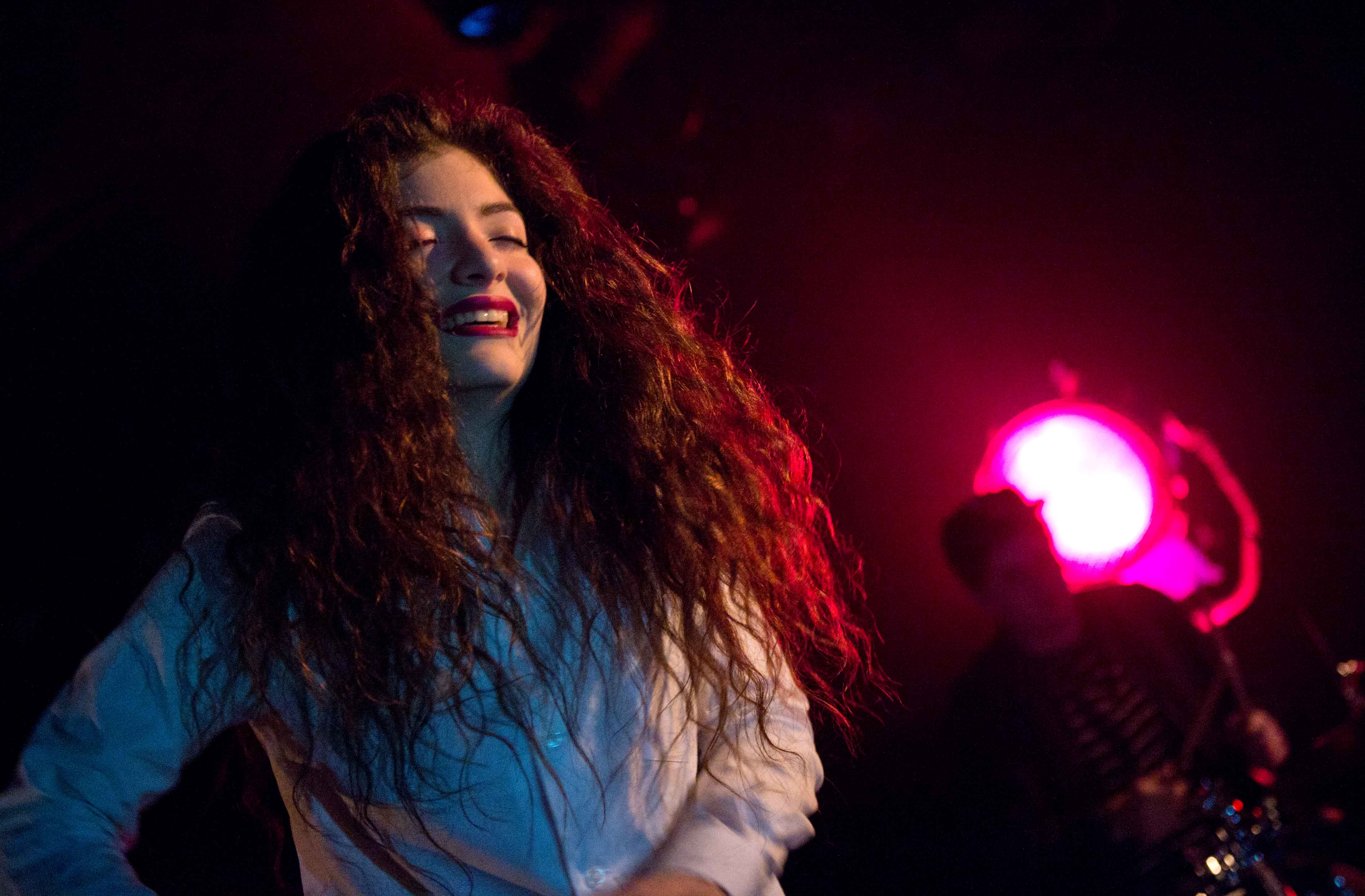
"Stoned at the Nail Salon" drew comparison by critics to Lorde's (pictured) earlier work.

Writing for Rolling Stone, Althea Legaspi and Brittany Spanos called the song "a somber reflection on growing older", labeling it "in opposition" to Lorde's previous single, "Solar Power". Also of Rolling Stone, Angie Martoccio described the song as "wistful, eloquent, and exhilarating", calling "Stoned at the Nail Salon" a "heart-wrenching ballad" in the mould of Lucy Dacus' "Thumbs" and Clairo's "Blouse". Dork's Stephen Ackroyd wrote of "Stoned at the Nail Salon" as a "low-key, delicate cut".

In a Billboard article, Hannah Dailey connected the song to Lorde's previous works, opining that it "channels several themes from Lorde's past work", naming "Ribs" and "Liability" specifically. Vulture writer Justin Curto also contrasted the song with "Solar Power", writing that "Stoned in the Nail Salon" is "more in line with the contemplative Lorde we knew on Melodrama and Pure Heroine than the one we met on "Solar Power"".

In a Pitchfork review, Quinn Moreland compared the song's "understated production" to Lana Del Rey's Chemtrails over the Country Club, saying that the song is "most compelling when Lorde lets her anxieties breathe", but concluding by stating that moments like that in the song are few, and that "Stoned in the Nail Salon" ultimately felt "stuck in a pretty, pedicured bubble". Al Newstead of Triple J branded the song a "meditation on aging", contrasting what he called the "summer-soaked, carefree first taste" of "Solar Power" with the "more sombre track" of "Stoned at the Nail Salon", which he compared to "the bleeding heart balladry of 'Liability'".

A Junkee article written by Joseph Earp called "Stoned at the Nail Salon" the autumn to the "burning summer" of "Solar Power", remarking that the song "works its magic in the background", comparing it to "a haze of pot smoke". In Flood Magazine, Margaret Farrell commented that the song was a "graceful ballad about getting high", where Lorde sings about the passage of time "over a tenderly plucked electric guitar".

Alexis Petridis of The Guardian wrote that "Stoned at the Nail Salon" had "softly yearning power". Writing for The Daily Telegraph, Neil McCormick said that "folky jaunt Stoned at the Nail Salon toys lightly with regret". In The Independent, Helen Brown opined that the production of Jack Antonoff "trickles out aimless arpeggios on "Stoned at the Nail Salon" as Lorde sighs over growing out of the songs she loved at 16 and sounds like she's already bored by the one she's singing", remarking that the song felt "sun-bleached of melody". A Spin article by Bobby Olivier called the track "decidedly dull in its acoustic musings".

== Commercial performance ==
In Lorde's home country of New Zealand, "Stoned at the Nail Salon" debuted at number 33 in the week of 2 August 2021 on Recorded Music NZ's Official Top 40 Singles chart, later re-entering and peaking at number 22 in the week of 30 August 2021 following the album's release. In the same week of its debut, the song also topped the Hot 20 NZ Singles chart, which tracks the 20 "fastest-moving" tracks by New Zealand artists. "Stoned at the Nail Salon" also charted in Australia after its release, appearing at number 74 on the ARIA Singles Chart and later peaking at number 60 following Solar Power's release.

The song charted at number 80 on the Ireland Singles Top 100 chart in the week ending July 30, 2021, and returned and repeaked on the same chart at number 75 after the release of Solar Power. In the United States, the song debuted at number 42 on the Billboard Hot Rock & Alternative Songs chart in the week of July 31, 2021, before moving up to a peak of number 18 the next week. After the release of Solar Power, Stoned at the Nail Salon appeared at number 85 on the Official Charts Company's UK Singles Chart.

== Live performances ==
Lorde performed the song live on Late Night with Seth Meyers on July 22, 2021 with Jack Antonoff. On August 6, 2021, she released a performance of the track alongside Jack Antonoff on the roof of Electric Lady Studios in New York City, where Lorde, according to Claire Shaffer of Rolling Stone, "sings the contemplative track surrounded by lush tropical plants, while Antonoff accompanies her on electric guitar". Billboard writer Hannah Dailey described the performance as "delicate", and called it a "dreamy acoustic version" of "Stoned at the Nail Salon".

== Track listing ==
Streaming

1. "Stoned at the Nail Salon" – 4:26
2. "Solar Power" – 3:12

== Credits and personnel ==
Credits adapted from Tidal.

- Lorde – vocals, songwriting, production
- Jack Antonoff – songwriting, production, bass, acoustic guitar, electric 6-string, Mellotron, piano, mixing
- Phoebe Bridgers – background vocals
- Clairo – background vocals
- Lawrence Arabia – background vocals
- Marlon Williams – background vocals
- Laura Sisk – mixing
- Chris Gehringer – mastering
- Will Quinnell – mastering

== Charts ==
Weekly chart positions for "Stoned at the Nail Salon"
Chart (2021)	Peak position
Australia (ARIA)	60
Ireland (IRMA)	75
New Zealand (Recorded Music NZ)	22
UK Singles (Official Charts)	85
US Hot Rock & Alternative Songs (Billboard)	18

== Certifications ==
Certifications for "Stoned at the Nail Salon"
Region	Certification	Certified units/sales
Australia (ARIA)	Gold	35,000^{‡}
New Zealand (RMNZ)	Gold	15,000^{‡}
^{‡} Sales+streaming figures based on certification alone.

== Release history ==
Release dates and formats for "Stoned at the Nail Salon"
Region	Date	Format(s)	Label	Ref.
Australia	30 July 2021	Contemporary hit radio	Universal Music Australia	

== Mata Kohore / Stoned at the Nail Salon ==
"Mata Kohore / Stoned at the Nail Salon"

Song by Lorde

from the EP Te Ao Mārama
- Language: Māori
- Length: 4:27
- Label: Universal
- Songwriters: Ella Yelich O'Connor; Jack Antonoff
- Producers: Lorde; Jack Antonoff

Lyric video
- "Mata Kohore / Stoned at the Nail Salon" on YouTube

"Mata Kohore / Stoned at the Nail Salon" is a song recorded by New Zealand singer-songwriter Lorde. It is the third track from her Te Ao Mārama EP, and is performed fully in the Māori language. Dx7 contributes vocals to the song, while Marlon Williams and Bic Runga are featured as backing vocalists.

=== Background and lyrics ===
The song was translated into Māori by Hana Mereraiha, who called the English title a "metaphor for over-thinking stuff", and explained the Māori translation of the title as "Mata Kohore means sort of red eyes but also blurry-eyes, so when you're not quite seeing clearly – maybe you're over-thinking, or not seeing things so clearly".

=== Credits and personnel ===
Credits adapted from Tidal.

- Lorde – vocals, songwriting, production
- Jack Antonoff – songwriting, production, bass, acoustic guitar, electric 6-string, Mellotron, piano, mixing
- Dx7 – vocals
- Bic Runga – background vocals
- Marlon Williams – background vocals
- Laura Sisk – mixing
- Chris Gehringer – mastering
- Will Quinnell – mastering

=== Charts ===
Chart performance for "Mata Kohore / Stoned at the Nail Salon"
Chart (2021)	Peak position
New Zealand Te Reo Māori Singles (RMNZ)	10
