= Solar Power (song) =

2021 single by Lorde

Single by Lorde

from the album Solar Power
- Written: 2019–20
- Released: 11 June 2021
- Recorded: 2020
- Studio: Sound City Studios (Los Angeles, CA)
- Genre: Indie folk; psychedelia; sunshine pop
- Length: 3:12
- Label: Universal
- Songwriters: Ella Yelich-O'Connor; Jack Antonoff
- Producers: Lorde; Jack Antonoff

Lorde singles chronology
"Homemade Dynamite (Remix)" (2017)	"Solar Power" (2021)	"Stoned at the Nail Salon" (2021)

Music video
- "Solar Power" on YouTube

"Solar Power" is a song by New Zealand singer-songwriter Lorde, released on 11 June 2021 as the lead single from her third studio album of the same name. The song was written and produced by Lorde and Jack Antonoff and released to radio stations by Universal. Inspired by the 1990 single "Loaded" by Scottish band Primal Scream and early 2000s music, "Solar Power" is an indie folk, psychedelia, and sunshine pop song, marking a departure from Lorde's electronic and melancholia music styles. The lyrics of the song depict summer escapism set on a beach.

The song received positive reviews from music critics, who praised the song's lightweight sound as well as its experimental sound. It earned the NME award for Best Song in the World and a nomination for Single of the Year at the Aotearoa Music Awards. The song peaked inside the top 20 in Australia, New Zealand, and the United Kingdom and received gold certification from the Recorded Music NZ (RMNZ) and silver by the British Phonographic Industry (BPI).

Lorde and Joel Kefali directed the music video for "Solar Power", which shows Lorde on a beach with other beachgoers as a cult leader. Cinematography took place at Waiheke Island in New Zealand. She performed "Solar Power" at the Late Show with Stephen Colbert and at several music festivals. It was included in the set list for the Solar Power Tour (2022–23). The song was translated into the Māori language by Hēmi Kelly, and was performed and released by Lorde as "Te Ao Mārama / Solar Power", the second track from her EP Te Ao Mārama, released on 9 September 2021.

== Background and release ==
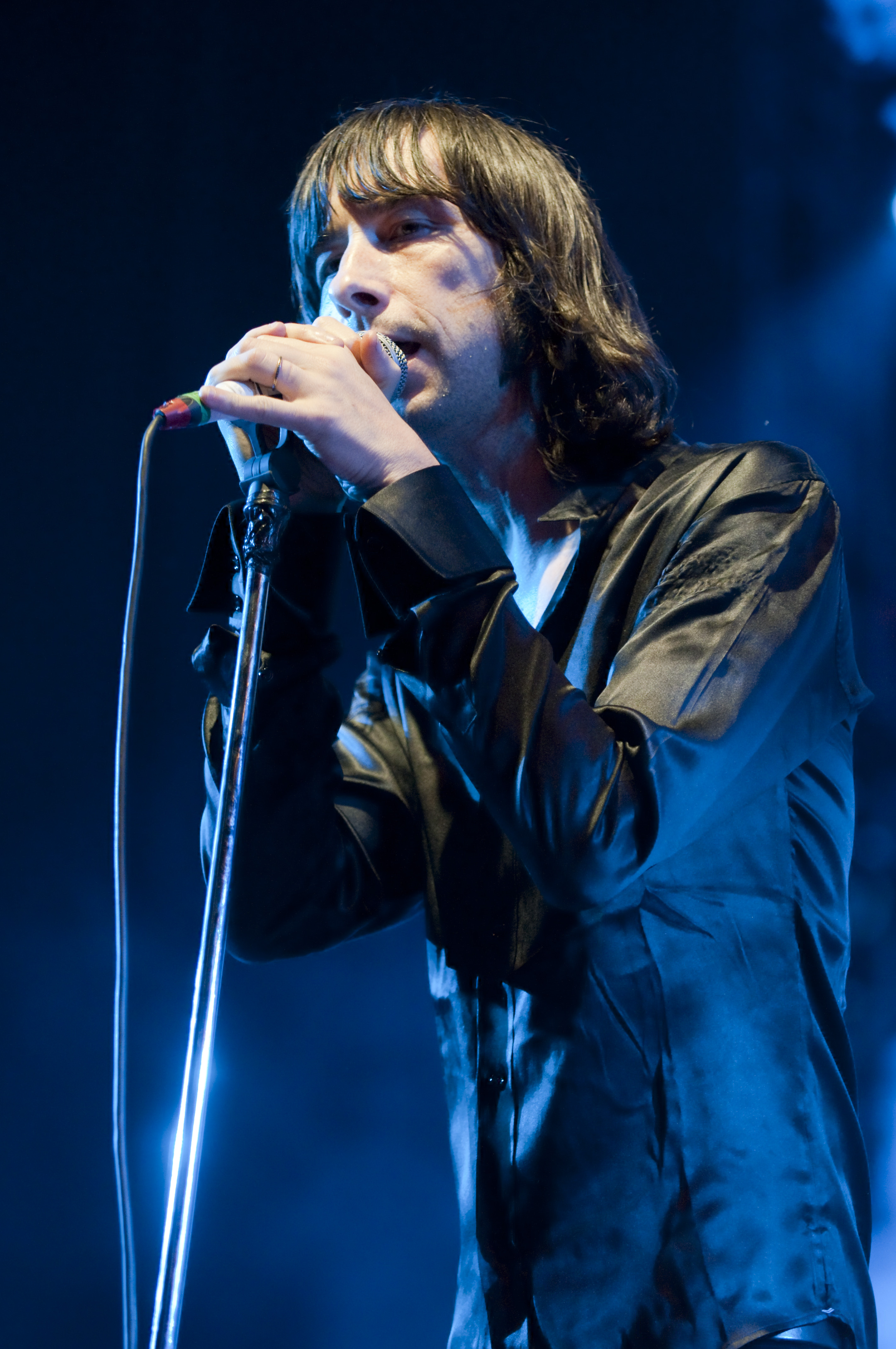
"Solar Power" was inspired by "Loaded", a 1990 song from Scottish band Primal Scream (lead singer Bobby Gillespie pictured)

After concluding the Melodrama World Tour in November 2018, Lorde retreated from the spotlight and began learning how to play the piano for her then upcoming record. The following year, Lorde began spending time with her friend, American scriptwriter Cazzie David, at a vacation home owned by American comedian Larry David in Martha’s Vineyard off the coast in Massachusetts. The song was conceived during a summer day after the singer spent time swimming in the area. She wrote the track on a Yamaha DX keyboard and later brought the demo to American producer Jack Antonoff, who assisted in the writing and production of her previous record, for further development. Lorde would continue work on the song traveling in between New York and New Zealand.

While writing the song, Lorde initially associated the melody of “Solar Power” to the 2000 song “Rock DJ” by British singer Robbie Williams. She later decided to conceptualise the song in a summer setting, which she did so by opening the windows in the studio during summertime. She also incorporated cicadas in the production of the song, in an effort to capture her perception of a New Zealand summer. The singer stated that the 1990 song “Loaded” by Scottish band Primal Scream influenced “Solar Power”. In an interview with New Zealand radio DJ Zane Lowe for Apple Music 1, Lorde stated that she communicated with the band’s frontman, Scottish singer Bobby Gillespie, who cleared the song and told her, “These things happen, you caught a vibe that we caught years ago.”

Lorde was announced as the headliner for Primavera Sound 2022 in May 2021, with an announcement from the festival, stating that the singer would "emerge from her retirement with her third album". On 7 June 2021, Lorde updated her website with the artwork of the single with a message at the bottom of the page, stating: "Arriving in 2021... Patience is a virtue". On 10 June 2021, "Solar Power" was released erroneously on several streaming sites, including Apple Music, Tidal, and YouTube, for hours before being promptly removed. The song was officially released on 11 June 2021 to coincide with the solar eclipse. It was originally scheduled for release on 21 June 2021, during the summer solstice.

== Composition and lyrical interpretation ==
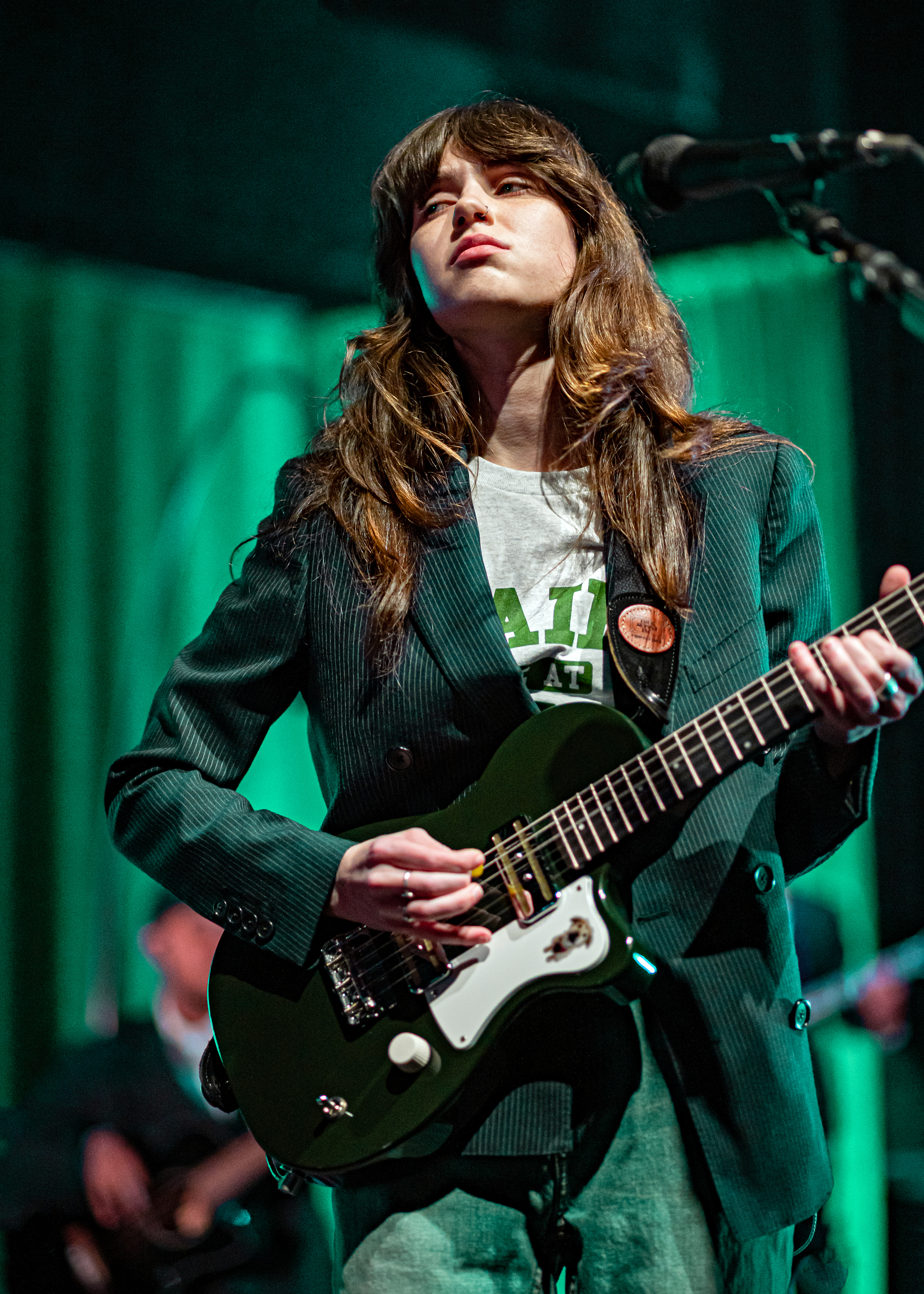
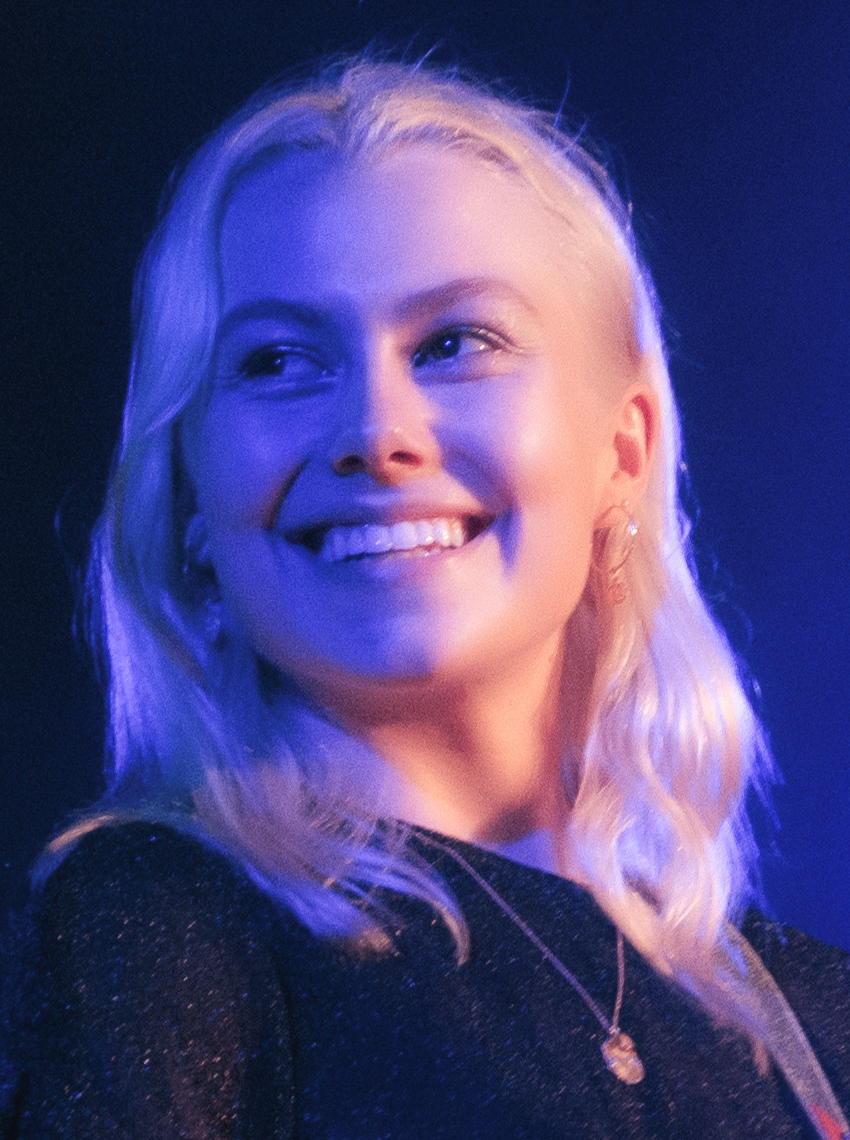
American singers Clairo (left) and Phoebe Bridgers (right) provide background vocals on "Solar Power".

"Solar Power" has been described as an indie folk, psychedelia, and sunshine pop song. The song is led by an acoustic guitar and features trumpet, saxophone, bass, and bongo drums. Lorde wrote and produced "Solar Power" with Antonoff. Antonoff also performed on various instruments: acoustic guitar, electric guitar, twelve-string guitar, percussion, and drums while American producer Malay provided additional production on the track.

American session drummer Matt Chamberlain worked on the programming, percussion, and played the drums. Cole Kamen-Green participated in the trumpet, and Evan Smith with the saxophone. "Solar Power" received vocal production from Tony Berg and was engineered by Will Maclellan at Sound City Studios. It was mixed by Mark Stent at Mixsuit LA/UK, and received assistance by Matt Wolach.

The track includes background vocals from American singers Phoebe Bridgers and Clairo in the choirs. Lorde noted that this was the first time other artists provided vocals on her tracks. When writing "Solar Power", she stated that she had an interest in featuring her "most God-tier female vocalist friends" on the song. The three singers worked remotely; Bridgers stated that one of her favourite moments of recording the track was being "so unconnected" to Lorde that "borders and being in the same town as someone just stopped mattering completely." Clairo revealed that she met Lorde through a FaceTime call she had with Antonoff while drafting ideas for her sophomore album Sling (2021). The idea to feature other vocalists on "Solar Power" was influenced by the Laurel Canyon era where singers provided secret vocals to other artists.

The songwriting process took around six to eight months and ended once the chorus was devised. "Solar Power" was inspired by the 1999 song "Steal My Sunshine" by Canadian alternative rock band Len, American folk rock group the Mamas & the Papas, British group S Club 7, and early 2000s music. The opening line, "I hate the winter / Can't stand the cold" were noted as a response to Lorde's 2019 trip to Antarctica. The line "I'm kinda like a prettier Jesus" was interpreted as Lorde's newfound confidence, while the line "Can you reach me? No, you can't!" was viewed as a reference to her reclusive personality. The line "Can I kick it? Yes I can" is a reference to the 1990 song "Can I Kick It?" by American hip hop group A Tribe Called Quest, the same line was previously quoted by Robbie Williams in his song "Rock DJ" which Lorde cited as an influence on "Solar Power". The lines "Come on and let the bliss begin" and "Blink three times when you feel kickin in" are a reference to the drug LSD.

== Critical reception ==
"Solar Power" received positive reviews from music critics, with many praising its summer sound. Writing for Pitchfork, Anna Gaca called the song a "soft-touch anthem for the simple pleasures of summer". In his five-star review, Rhian Daly of NME labeled it a "quietly but supremely confident", and drew musical comparisons to the 1991 album Screamadelica by Primal Scream, American songwriter Joni Mitchell, and the sound of English rock band Wolf Alice since their 2017 album Visions of a Life. Writers for New Zealand magazine The Spinoff generally praised "Solar Power"; Toby Manhire called the song an "instant classic", and Stewart Sowman-Lund described it as "perfectly summery".

Sal Cinquemani of Slant Magazine stated that while the track lacked the "urgency of her best songs", its "breezy, psychedelic quality" perfectly pairs for "summer drives and beach trips, and an optimistic outlook". Writers for Vulture received the song well, with Craig Jenkins noting that it had a "good heart and good taste". The publication compared its sound to English alternative rock band Happy Mondays, while its guitar rhythm was compared to the 1987 song "Faith" by English singer George Michael. Justin Curto, in another review from the same publication, called it a "beachside babe bop", and compared the song's bridge to Michael's 1990 song "Freedom! '90".

In a Billboard piece, Jason Lipshutz wrote that "Solar Power" was a "playful splash of salt water onto our faces in time for the summer", calling it "deceptively simple", noting the saxophone and trumpet in the mix, and asserted that Lorde "remains one of the best at filling the corners of her songs with personalized knickknacks". In a five star review, Rachel Brodsky of The Independent praised Lorde for "finding a new way to express a universal feeling", comparing it to the 1988 song "Kokomo" by American rock band the Beach Boys. Consequence named it "Song of the Week", describing it as "light, bouncy, and nonchalant", emphasising its departure from Lorde's previous works.

Critical rankings for "Solar Power"
Critic/Organization	Time span	Rank	Published year
NME	Year-end	6	2021
Rolling Stone	Year-end	21	2021

== Music video ==
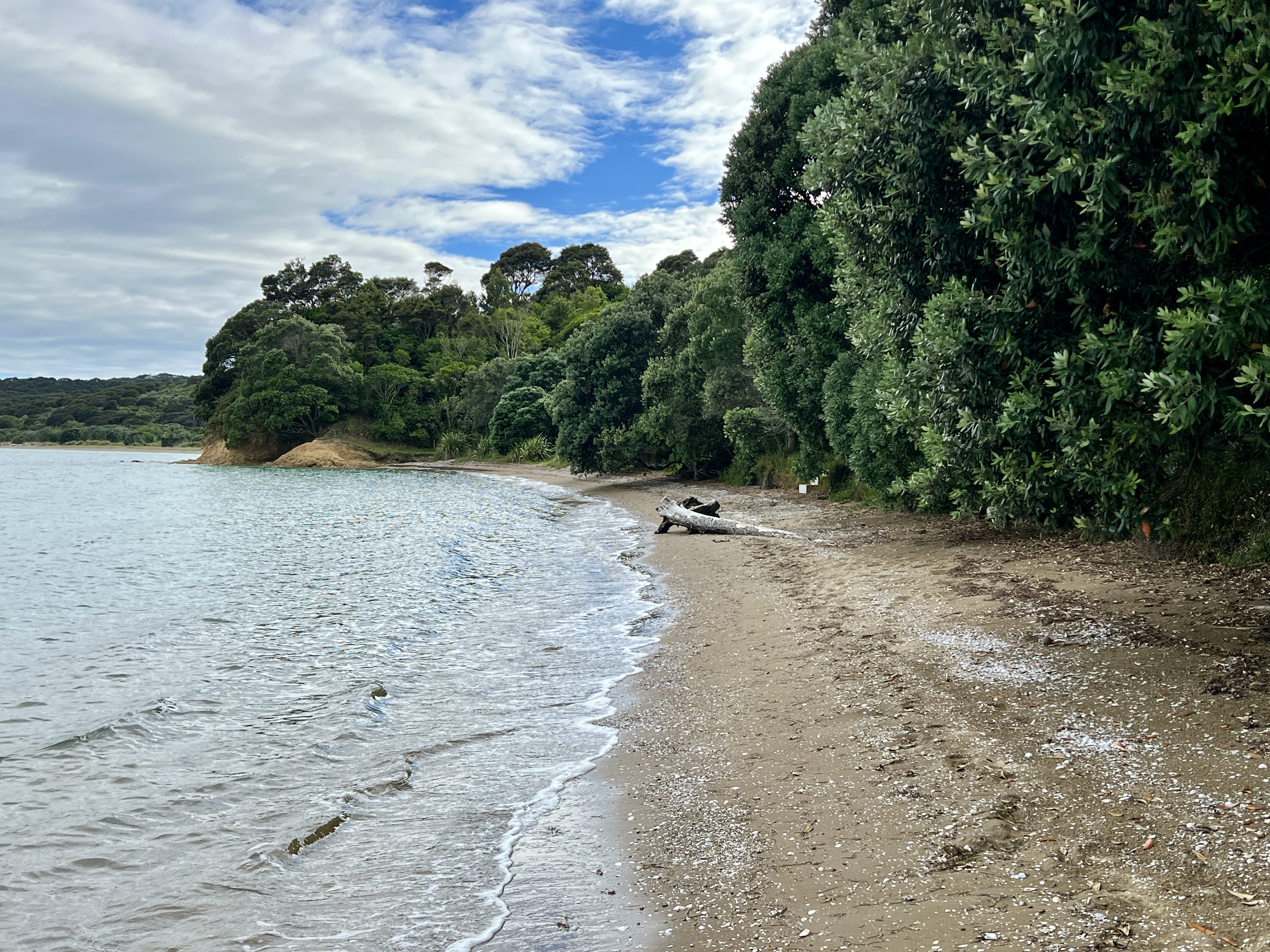
The secrecy of the video's filming location led journalists to speculate it was filmed in Waiheke Island, New Zealand (pictured).

The music video for "Solar Power" was released on 11 June 2021, directed by Lorde and Joel Kefali. It marked Lorde and Kefali's first music video collaboration since "Tennis Court" (2013). She told American actress Hunter Schafer for the A24 podcast Divine Frequency that she wrote all the treatments for the video and assisted with its production. Lorde conceived the video concept to personify a cult leader, taking references from the 2019 folk horror film Midsommar, 1960s Coca-Cola commercials, the series finale episode "Person to Person" from the American period drama series Mad Men (2007–15), the 1978 American romantic period drama film Days of Heaven, and the 1970 American drama film Zabreski Point.

With a presumption that the video was filmed in New Zealand, Newshub claimed that the location of the music video was Cactus Bay on Waiheke Island, arguing that the landmass in the distance was the Coromandel Peninsula, and presuming that a cargo ship in the background placed the video's location north of Auckland. The chair of the Waiheke Local Board, Cath Handley, also claimed that the location of the music video was Cactus Bay and she hoped that the music video did not "hurdle huge numbers of people" towards the island. While not disclosing the location of the beach, in an interview with Jesse Mulligan of The Project, Lorde asked people not to "go and desecrate any beaches with selfie sticks or anything" when asked about where the video was filmed.

The video begins with a close up shot of Lorde, laying in a beach blanket with Karen Walker sunglasses, as the camera extends to reveal other beachgoers next to her. Dressed in a yellow silk Collina Strada two-piece set, Lorde stands up and walks through a wood canopy in the sand and points towards several beachgoers dancing. The camera pans to show Lorde, playing chess, with a male figure. The next scene shows a table gathering in the open air as a gold horn is passed around but Lorde declines its use. The camera momentarily shows Lorde passing through a small pile of garbage in the sand. The singer is then shown smoking from a fennel bulb bong, and makes her way towards a wood raft that four male figures push to the sea. Lorde then dances while multiple beachgoers stand beside her dressed in muted pastel colours as well as other beachgoers performing wild dance routines. The final scene shows Lorde with an umbrella being carried on a chair while beachgoers follow her.

== Live performances and promotion ==
Shortly after releasing the song, Lorde was interviewed virtually for the Late Show with Stephen Colbert where she discussed the album associated with the track and its artwork. The following month, Lorde performed "Solar Power" for the first time at the show from the rooftop of Ed Sullivan Theater. Lorde wore a yellow dress while her band wore muted suits for the performance on top of a mirrored circular stage with overlapping circles. The performance ended with bubbles as the singer looked over the Manhattan skyline. The performance was positively received. Stereogum praised her performance skills, calling it a "cool bit of television theater". She also performed the song, along with four other tracks at Good Morning America in Central Park as part of their Summer Concert series in August 2021. As part of a weeklong residency, Lorde performed "Solar Power" at the Late Late Show with James Corden. The stage was designed to emulate a beech, with a tan floor, a sky backdrop, while her band performed barefoot and the singer wore a bright yellow outfit. She also performed the track sitting on a set of stairs at Global Citizen Live, where she delivered an environmental speech before singing the song.

== Credits and personnel ==
- Lorde – vocals, songwriting, production
- Jack Antonoff – songwriting, production, bass, electric guitar, acoustic guitar, drums, percussion, 12-string acoustic guitar
- Phoebe Bridgers – background vocals
- Clairo – background vocals
- Matt Chamberlain – drums, programming, percussion
- Evan Smith – saxophone
- Cole Kamen-Green – trumpet
- Spike Stent – mixing
- Matt Wolach – assistant mixing
- Chris Gehringer – mastering
- Will Quinnell – mastering

== Charts ==
=== Weekly charts ===
Weekly chart performance for "Solar Power"
Chart (2021)	Peak position
Australia (ARIA)	14
Bolivia Anglo (Monitor Latino)	13
Canada Hot 100 (Billboard)	22
Canada Rock (Billboard)	35
Colombia (National-Report)	72
Czech Republic Singles Digital (ČNS IFPI)	77
Global 200 (Billboard)	26
Ireland (IRMA)	11
Japan Hot Overseas (Billboard Japan)	11
Lithuania (AGATA)	36
Netherlands (Single Top 100)	99
New Zealand (Recorded Music NZ)	2
Portugal (AFP)	48
Singapore (RIAS)	24
Slovakia (Singles Digitál Top 100)	64
Sweden (Sverigetopplistan)	54
Switzerland (Schweizer Hitparade)	95
UK Singles (Official Charts)	17
US Billboard Hot 100	64
US Hot Rock & Alternative Songs (Billboard)	6
US Rock & Alternative Airplay (Billboard)	10
US Rolling Stone Top 100	43

=== Year-end charts ===
Year-end chart performance for "Solar Power"
Chart (2021)	Position
US Hot Rock & Alternative Songs (Billboard)	42

== Certifications ==
Certifications for "Solar Power"
Region	Certification	Certified units/sales
Australia (ARIA)	Platinum	70,000^{‡}
Brazil (Pro-Música Brasil)	Platinum	40,000^{‡}
Canada (Music Canada)	Gold	40,000^{‡}
New Zealand (RMNZ)	Platinum	30,000^{‡}
United Kingdom (BPI)	Silver	200,000^{‡}
^{‡} Sales+streaming figures based on certification alone.

== Release history ==
Release dates and formats for "Solar Power"
Region	Date	Format(s)	Label	Ref.
Various	11 June 2021	Digital download; streaming	Universal Music New Zealand	
Australia	11 June 2021	Contemporary hit radio	Universal Music Australia	
United States	14 June 2021	Triple A radio	Crush Music; Republic	
United States	15 June 2021	Alternative radio	Crush Music; Republic	
Italy	25 June 2021	Contemporary hit radio	Universal	

== Te Ao Mārama / Solar Power ==
"Te Ao Mārama / Solar Power"

Song by Lorde

from the EP Te Ao Mārama
- Language: Māori
- Length: 3:11
- Label: Universal
- Songwriters: Ella Yelich O'Connor; Jack Antonoff
- Producers: Lorde; Jack Antonoff

Lyric video
- "Te Ao Mārama / Solar Power" on YouTube

"Te Ao Mārama / Solar Power" is a song recorded by New Zealand singer-songwriter Lorde. It is the second track from her Te Ao Mārama EP, and is performed fully in the Māori language. "Te Ao Mārama" translates to "world of light" in Māori, which is both a reference to the title of Solar Power, and the phrase "mai te pō ki te ao mārama", which Leonie Hayden of The Spinoff called "the transition from night to the enlightened world that comprises part of the Māori creation narrative (similar to Adam and Eve's apple, but from the point of view that knowledge is a good thing)".

The song was translated into Māori by Hēmi Kelly, who said of the song, "I love the warmth of summer so it was easy for me to connect with the lyrics. It talks about leaving your worries behind and moving into a positive space. That reminded me of the transition in our creation narratives of moving from darkness, te pō, into the world of light, te ao mārama. That’s a transition we continually navigate throughout our lives."

=== Charts ===
Chart performance for "Te Ao Mārama / Solar Power"
Chart (2021)	Peak position
New Zealand Te Reo Māori Singles (RMNZ)	5

=== Year-end charts ===
2021 year-end chart performance for "Te Ao Mārama / Solar Power"
Chart (2021)	Position
New Zealand Te Reo Māori (Recorded Music NZ)	10
