= Universal Music New Zealand =

- Industry: Music, Entertainment
- Founded: 1926
- Headquarters: Auckland, New Zealand
- Key people: Adam Holt (Chairman)
- Parent: Universal Music Group
- Divisions: List of Universal Music Group labels
- Website: universalmusic.co.nz

Universal Music New Zealand (UMNZ) is the New Zealand subsidiary of the Universal Music Group (UMG), the world's largest music company. Universal Music New Zealand's corporate headquarters are located in Auckland, New Zealand.

The company represents all of UMG's international labels within New Zealand and signs, markets, and distributes New Zealand artists and labels within New Zealand and around the world.

== Company history in New Zealand ==
=== His Master's Voice/EMI ===
Universal Music New Zealand's history goes back to 10 May 1926 when His Master's Voice (NZ) Limited was incorporated as a subsidiary of the UK's The Gramophone Co. Ltd. with E J Hyams as its Managing Director and largest shareholder. In 1931, on Hyams' retirement, The Gramophone Co. Ltd. purchased the balance of the shares and appointed Alfred Wyness as the new Managing Director. In 1948 Wyness arranged for a record pressing plant to be imported from England. Over the next three decades, the company dominated the New Zealand music industry selling records, tapes, whiteware, electronics and more, with factories in Masterton and Wellington, where it owned a record pressing plant until 1987. His Master's Voice (NZ) Ltd. was renamed EMI (New Zealand) Ltd. in 1972.

=== Philips/Phonogram/PolyGram ===
The Dutch company Philips introduced a record division into the New Zealand market in 1951 but it wasn't until the mid to late 1960s that the Philips label began to eat into HMV's market dominance. In the 1970s, Philips Records division was renamed Phonogram Ltd. and then PolyGram Records Ltd

=== Pye ===
In 1951 the UK company Pye Ltd. created Pye (N.Z.) Ltd and purchased the Paeroa based interests of Akrad Radio Corporation Ltd. headed by George Wooller which included G.A. Woolller & Co. Ltd. under which it established a record division. By the turn of the 1960s, this was the second-largest record company in New Zealand. In 1961 Wooller acquired Allied International Records, and, then, in 1964 the Radio Corporation Of NZ. This succession of acquisitions brought the catalogues of Prestige Records, TANZA, and Allied International into the company

In 1966, Pye UK was purchased by Philips but Pye/Allied retained autonomy in New Zealand until 1976 when it was folded into PolyGram.

=== Universal Music ===
Universal Records opened a New Zealand office, as MCA Records, in Auckland in 1996, and in January 1999 took over the operations of PolyGram New Zealand as part of the global merging of the two companies with George Ash as the first Managing Director of the larger company. He was succeeded in 2001 by Adam Holt who currently heads the company.

Following the 2012 takeover of EMI by Universal worldwide and regulatory approval in NZ, EMI New Zealand was absorbed into Universal Music New Zealand in September of that year, thus bringing much of New Zealand's recorded past including TANZA, EMI, HMV, PolyGram/Phonogram/Philips, Pye, Prestige, Allied International and other labels under one ownership umbrella.

Since 2000, Universal Music New Zealand successfully launched the careers of, amongst others, Lorde, Sol3 Mio, Gin Wigmore, Hayley Westenra, Elemeno P and Zed.

== The New Zealand reissue programme ==
In 2012, given the breadth of the Universal New Zealand catalogue, the company embarked on an extensive reissue programme. The scope was ambitious: to reissue everything the company owned which was recorded in New Zealand or by New Zealanders, even catalogue that was now in the public domain in New Zealand, digitally, remastered where possible from the original master tapes. The company appointed former EMI NZ Managing Director Chris Caddick to undertake this task. Caddick was in the midst of an earlier reissue programme, under the wing of Recorded Music New Zealand, the New Zealand Music Industry body of which he was the Board Chair, called Tied To The Tracks.

The relatively small size of New Zealand and the fact that most recordings done by New Zealanders in New Zealand have been made after 1949 helped make the programme achievable. That, coupled with the fact that Universal NZ owned the rights to the vast bulk of these recordings up to the 1980s, also gave this historic importance. More than that, it would likely be the first time globally that much of a nation's musical past was available online. That it was driven by the local operating company of a multi-national media corporation made the process even more unique.

The programme in New Zealand was supported by, George Ash, President of Universal Music, Australia and New Zealand. Ash, a New Zealander based in Sydney, Australia, also gave Universal NZ access to works recorded in Australia by New Zealanders. A major part of the process was the establishment of a clear chain of ownership especially to the smaller independent labels acquired by Universal NZ's predecessor. This was done by an independent researcher using resources from local government records, private archives and Archives New Zealand. The bulk of the catalogue, this being the albums, was sourced, remastered and digitised by the end of 2019, with new artist contracts signed at contemporary rates and singles not found on the original albums added as bonus tracks. This numbered 393 albums. That left the stray tracks by artists who had never recorded an album. In 2020 Caddick compiled a list of some 19 collections of between 30 and 40 tracks, gathered thematically and began the slow process of clearing and collating these.

== The New Zealand labels ==
(with the dates they issued NZ artist catalogue)

- His Master's Voice (1949–73)
- Tanza (1949–59)
- Pye (1965–75)
- Top Rank (1959–61)
- Prestige (1957–60)
- RCA (1965–70)
- Nixa (1960)
- Allied International (1961–68)
- Philips (1961–90)
- Polydor (1967–98)
- Parlophone (1927–30, 1956, 1960, 1964–65)
- Columbia (1930, 1958, 1968–70)
- Regal (1968–72)
- Harvest (1970–73)
- EMI (1973-2012)
- World Record Club (1964–80)
- AIR (1970–73)
- Karussell (1972–75)
- Vertigo (1970–83)
- Mercury (1991–94)
- Family (1972–75)
- Marble Arch (1969)
- MCA (1968–70)
- Universal (1996-)
- Shoestring (1973–74)

== Current New Zealand artists & labels represented by Universal Music New Zealand ==
- Beastwars
- Benee
- Broods
- Crowded House
- David Dallas
- Drax Project
- Katchafire
- Ladi6
- Lorde
- The Naked and Famous
- The Phoenix Foundation
- Shapeshifter
- Six60
- SJD
- Sol3 Mio
- SWIDT
- Niko Walters
- Marlon Williams

== Catalogue New Zealand artists represented by Universal Music New Zealand ==
- OMC
- The Exponents
- Elemeno P
- Graham Brazier
- Dave McArtney & The Pink Flamingoes
- Zed
- Hayley Westenra
- Anika Moa
- Nathan Haines
- Jamie McDell
- Adeaze
