= Songs for the Philippines =

Compilation album by Various Artists
- Released: 2013
- Genre: Rock, pop
- Label: Universal

Songs for the Philippines is a benefit album released in 2013. The album was produced as a fundraiser benefiting those affected by the 2013 Supertyphoon Haiyan in the Philippines, in which more than 6,300 people lost their lives. The artists, labels and managers all agreed to donate its proceeds to the Philippine Red Cross.

== Track listing ==
| No. | Title | Performer | Length |
|---|---|---|---|
| 1. | "Across the Universe" | The Beatles | 3:49 |
| 2. | "Shelter from the Storm" | Bob Dylan | 5:01 |
| 3. | "Have I Told You Lately That I Love You" | Michael Bublé and Naturally 7 | 3:26 |
| 4. | "In a Little While" | U2 | 3:40 |
| 5. | "Count on Me" | Bruno Mars | 3:17 |
| 6. | "I Was Here" | Beyoncé | 3:59 |
| 7. | "Stan (live at BBC Radio 1)" | Eminem | 3:47 |
| 8. | "Sirens" | Cher | 5:03 |
| 9. | "Make You Feel My Love" | Adele | 3:32 |
| 10. | "Unconditionally (Johnson Somerset remix)" | Katy Perry | 4:14 |
| 11. | "Best Song Ever" | One Direction | 3:20 |
| 12. | "Carry On" | fun. | 4:38 |
| 13. | "Born This Way (The Country Road version)" | Lady Gaga | 4:21 |
| 14. | "Mirrors" | Justin Timberlake | 8:04 |
| 15. | "I Would" | Justin Bieber | 3:47 |
| 16. | "New Day" | Alicia Keys | 4:02 |
| 17. | "30 Lives (original demo version)" | Imagine Dragons | 3:35 |
| 18. | "Like a Prayer" | Madonna | 5:51 |
| 19. | "Sober" | Pink | 4:11 |
| 20. | "I Believe in You" | Kylie Minogue | 3:20 |
| 21. | "Hero" | Enrique Iglesias | 4:24 |
| 22. | "Factory of Faith" | Red Hot Chili Peppers | 4:19 |
| 23. | "Roads Untraveled" | Linkin Park | 3:49 |
| 24. | "Use Somebody" | Kings of Leon | 3:50 |
| 25. | "Explorers" | Muse | 5:46 |
| 26. | "The Love Club" | Lorde | 3:21 |
| 27. | "Brave" | Josh Groban | 3:59 |
| 28. | "Stronger (What Doesn't Kill You)" | Kelly Clarkson | 3:41 |
| 29. | "Simple Things" | Paolo Nutini | 2:33 |
| 30. | "I Know You Care" | Ellie Goulding | 3:26 |
| 31. | "Carry You Home" | James Blunt | 3:54 |
| 32. | "Feel This Moment" | Pitbull and Christina Aguilera | 3:49 |
| 33. | "Sign On" | Earth, Wind & Fire | 4:17 |
| 34. | "Going Out" | apl.de.ap and Damien Leroy | 2:51 |
| 35. | "Brave" | Sara Bareilles | 3:40 |
| 36. | "Lead Me Home" | Jessica Sanchez | 4:38 |
| 37. | "Smile" | Lily Allen | 3:17 |
| 38. | "Love Don't Die" | The Fray | 3:03 |
| 39. | "Let It Be" | The Beatles | 4:03 |
