= List of awards and nominations received by Lorde =

Lorde awards and nominations
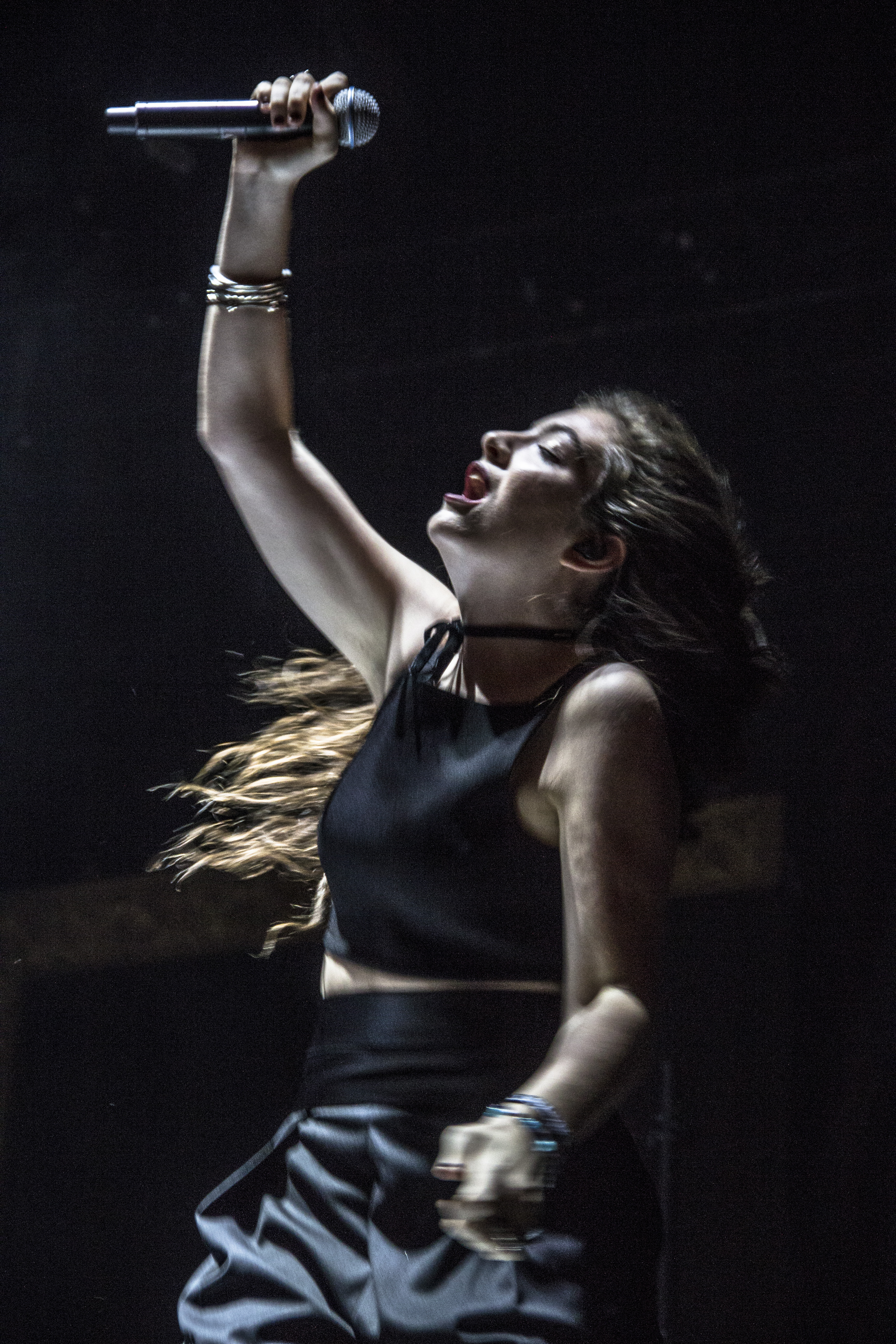
- Lorde at the Boston Calling festival in 2014
Awards and nominations
| Award | Wins | Nominations |
| American Music Awards | 0 | 4 |
| Aotearoa Music Awards | 22 | 33 |
| APRA Awards (Australia) | 1 | 1 |
| ARIA Music Awards | 0 | 2 |
| Billboard Music Awards | 2 | 13 |
| Brit Awards | 2 | 2 |
| Echo Awards | 0 | 1 |
| Glamour Awards | 0 | 1 |
| Golden Globe Awards | 0 | 1 |
| Grammy Awards | 2 | 5 |
| iHeartRadio Music Awards | 1 | 2 |
| MTV Europe Music Awards | 2 | 6 |
| MTV Video Music Awards | 1 | 5 |
| MTV Video Music Awards Japan | 0 | 1 |
| MTV Millennial Awards | 0 | 1 |
| Much Music Video Awards | 2 | 5 |
| Myx Music Awards | 0 | 1 |
| Nickelodeon Australian Kids' Choice Awards | 0 | 2 |
| NME Awards | 2 | 6 |
| People's Choice Awards | 0 | 1 |
| Q Awards | 0 | 2 |
| RTHK International Pop Poll Awards | 2 | 2 |
| Teen Choice Awards | 0 | 4 |
| World Music Awards | 3 | 15 |

Totals (Note: Certain award groups do not simply award one winner. They acknowledge several different recipients, have runners-up, and have third place. Since this is a specific recognition and is different from losing an award, runner-up mentions are considered wins in this award tally. For simplification and to avoid errors, each award in this list has been presumed to have had a prior nomination.)
- Wins: 47
- Nominations: 91

Lorde (born 1996) is a New Zealand singer-songwriter. She released her debut EP, The Love Club, and her debut studio album, Pure Heroine, in 2013. Lorde won a New Zealand Music Award for the former in 2013 and a Taite Music Prize for the latter in 2014. Her debut single "Royals" earned multiple awards and nominations from 2013 to 2014, including one APRA Award, one Billboard Music Award and one MTV Video Music Award. The single won Song of the Year and Best Pop Solo Performance at the 2014 Grammy Awards. At age 17, Lorde is the youngest artist to ever win a Grammy Award for Song of the Year.

Lorde contributed four songs to the soundtrack for The Hunger Games: Mockingjay, Part 1, including the single "Yellow Flicker Beat". With the latter track, the singer earned nominations for Best Original Song at the Golden Globe Awards and Best Song at the Critics' Choice Awards in 2015. Her second album Melodrama, released in 2017, won a New Zealand Music Award and earned a nomination for Album of the Year at the 2018 Grammy Awards ceremony. Overall, she has received 45 awards and 86 nominations as of July 2018.

== Awards and nominations ==
| Award | Year (Note: Indicates the year of ceremony. Each year is linked to the article about the awards held that year, wherever possible.) | Recipient(s) and nominee(s) | Category | Result | Ref. |
|---|---|---|---|---|---|
| American Music Awards | 2014 | Lorde | Favorite Pop/Rock Female Artist | Nominated | |
| American Music Awards | 2014 | Lorde | Favorite Alternative Artist | Nominated | |
| American Music Awards | 2014 | Pure Heroine | Favorite Pop/Rock Album | Nominated | |
Aotearoa Music Awards
| Aotearoa Music Awards | 2013 | "Royals" | Single of the Year | Won | |
| Aotearoa Music Awards | 2013 | The Love Club EP | Breakthrough Artist of the Year | Won | |
| Aotearoa Music Awards | 2013 | Lorde | People's Choice Award | Won | |
| Aotearoa Music Awards | 2013 | Lorde | International Achievement Award (Note: No nominees were announced for this award.) | Won | |
| Aotearoa Music Awards | 2014 | "Team" | Single of the Year | Won | |
| Aotearoa Music Awards | 2014 | "Royals" | Highest Selling New Zealand Single | Won | |
| Aotearoa Music Awards | 2014 | Pure Heroine | Album of the Year | Won | |
| Aotearoa Music Awards | 2014 | Pure Heroine | Best Female Solo Artist | Won | |
| Aotearoa Music Awards | 2014 | Pure Heroine | Best Pop Album | Won | |
| Aotearoa Music Awards | 2014 | Lorde | People's Choice Award | Nominated | |
| Aotearoa Music Awards | 2014 | Lorde | International Achievement Award | Won | |
| Aotearoa Music Awards | 2015 | "Yellow Flicker Beat" | Single of the Year | Won | |
| Aotearoa Music Awards | 2015 | "Yellow Flicker Beat" | Highest Selling New Zealand Single | Nominated | |
| Aotearoa Music Awards | 2015 | "Yellow Flicker Beat" | Radio Airplay Record of the Year | Nominated | |
| Aotearoa Music Awards | 2015 | Pure Heroine | Highest Selling New Zealand Album | Nominated | |
| Aotearoa Music Awards | 2015 | Lorde | International Achievement Award | Won | |
| Aotearoa Music Awards | 2017 | Melodrama | Album of the Year | Won | |
| Aotearoa Music Awards | 2017 | "Green Light" | Single of the Year | Won | |
| Aotearoa Music Awards | 2017 | Lorde | Best Solo Artist | Won | |
| Aotearoa Music Awards | 2017 | Lorde | Best Pop Artist | Won | |
| Aotearoa Music Awards | 2017 | Lorde | People Choice Awards | Won | |
| Aotearoa Music Awards | 2017 | Lorde | International Achievement Award | Won | |
| Aotearoa Music Awards | 2021 | "Solar Power" | Single of the Year | Nominated | |
| Aotearoa Music Awards | 2022 | Solar Power | Album of the Year | Nominated | |
| Aotearoa Music Awards | 2022 | Lorde | Best Solo Artist | Nominated | |
| Aotearoa Music Awards | 2022 | Lorde | Best Pop Artist | Nominated | |
| Aotearoa Music Awards | 2022 | "Secrets from a Girl (Who's Seen It All)" | Best Music Video Content | Won | |
| Aotearoa Music Awards | 2025 | "Girl, So Confusing featuring Lorde" (with Charli XCX) | Single of the Year | Won | |
| Aotearoa Music Awards | 2026 | Virgin | Album of the Year | Nominated | |
| Aotearoa Music Awards | 2026 | Virgin | Best Pop Artist | Won | |
| Aotearoa Music Awards | 2026 | "What Was That" | Single of the Year | Nominated | |
| Aotearoa Music Awards | 2026 | Lorde | Best Solo Artist | Nominated | |
| Aotearoa Music Awards | 2026 | Lorde | International Achievement | Won | |
| Australian APRA Awards | 2014 | Lorde | Outstanding International Achievement Award | Won | |
| ARIA Music Awards | 2014 | Pure Heroine | Best International Artist | Nominated | |
| ARIA Music Awards | 2017 | Melodrama | Best International Artist | Nominated | |
| ASCAP Pop Music Awards | 2014 | "Royals" | Most Performed Songs | Won | |
| BBC Music Awards | 2014 | Lorde | Best International Artist | Nominated | |
| BBC Music Awards | 2014 | "Royals" | Song of the Year | Nominated | |
| BBC Music Awards | 2017 | Lorde | Artist of the Year | Nominated | |
Billboard Music Awards
| Billboard Music Awards | 2014 | Lorde | New Artist of the Year | Won | |
| Billboard Music Awards | 2014 | Lorde | Top Female Artist | Nominated | |
| Billboard Music Awards | 2014 | Lorde | Top Hot 100 Artist | Nominated | |
| Billboard Music Awards | 2014 | Lorde | Top Digital Songs Artist | Nominated | |
| Billboard Music Awards | 2014 | Lorde | Top Radio Songs Artist | Nominated | |
| Billboard Music Awards | 2014 | Lorde | Top Rock Artist | Nominated | |
| Billboard Music Awards | 2014 | "Royals" | Top Hot 100 Song | Nominated | |
| Billboard Music Awards | 2014 | "Royals" | Top Digital Song | Nominated | |
| Billboard Music Awards | 2014 | "Royals" | Top Radio Song | Nominated | |
| Billboard Music Awards | 2014 | "Royals" | Top Streaming Song (Audio) | Nominated | |
| Billboard Music Awards | 2014 | "Royals" | Top Rock Song | Won | |
| Billboard Music Awards | 2014 | Pure Heroine | Top Rock Album | Nominated | |
| Billboard Music Awards | 2015 | Pure Heroine | Top Rock Album | Nominated | |
| Billboard Music Awards | 2015 | Lorde | Top Rock Artist | Nominated | |
| Brit Awards | 2014 | Lorde | International Female Solo Artist | Won | |
| Brit Awards | 2018 | Lorde | International Female Solo Artist | Won | |
| Critics' Choice Movie Awards | 2015 | "Yellow Flicker Beat" | Best Song | Nominated | |
| Echo Music Awards | 2014 | Lorde | Best International Female | Nominated | |
| Echo Music Awards | 2015 | Lorde | Best International Newcomer | Nominated | |
| GAFFA Awards (Sweden) | 2018 | Lorde | Best Foreign Solo Act | Nominated | |
| Glamour Awards | 2014 | Pure Heroine | Next Breakthrough | Nominated | |
| Golden Globe Awards | 2015 | "Yellow Flicker Beat" | Best Original Song | Nominated | |
| Grammy Awards | 2014 | "Royals" | Record of the Year | Nominated | |
| Grammy Awards | 2014 | "Royals" | Song of the Year | Won | |
| Grammy Awards | 2014 | "Royals" | Best Pop Solo Performance | Won | |
| Grammy Awards | 2014 | Pure Heroine | Best Pop Vocal Album | Nominated | |
| Grammy Awards | 2018 | Melodrama | Album of the Year | Nominated | |
| iHeartRadio Music Awards | 2014 | Lorde | Best New Artist | Won | |
| iHeartRadio Music Awards | 2014 | "Royals" | Alternative Rock Song of the Year | Nominated | |
| iHeartRadio Music Awards | 2018 | "Homemade Dynamite" | Best Remix | Nominated | |
| iHeartRadio Music Awards | 2022 | Solar Power | Best Comeback Album | Nominated | |
International Dance Music Award
| International Dance Music Award | 2014 | Lorde | Best Breakthrough Artist (Solo) | Nominated | |
| International Dance Music Award | 2014 | "Royals" | Best Commercial / Pop Dance Track | Nominated | |
| MPG Awards | 2018 | Lorde | International Producer of the Year | Nominated | |
| MTV Europe Music Awards | 2013 | Lorde | Best New Zealand Act | Won | |
| MTV Europe Music Awards | 2013 | Lorde | Artist on the Rise | Nominated | |
| MTV Europe Music Awards | 2014 | Lorde | Best Push Act | Nominated | |
| MTV Europe Music Awards | 2014 | Lorde | Best New Zealand Act | Won | |
| MTV Europe Music Awards | 2014 | Lorde | Best Alternative | Nominated | |
| MTV Europe Music Awards | 2015 | Lorde | Best Alternative | Nominated | |
| MTV Europe Music Awards | 2017 | Lorde | Best Alternative | Nominated | |
| MTV Europe Music Awards | 2017 | Lorde | Best New Zealand Act | Nominated | |
| MTV Europe Music Awards | 2021 | Lorde | Best Alternative | Nominated | |
| MTV Europe Music Awards | 2022 | Lorde | Best New Zealand Act | Won | |
| MTV Millennial Awards | 2017 | "Green Light" | International Hit of the Year | Nominated | |
| MTV Video Music Awards | 2014 | "Royals" | Best Female Video | Nominated | |
| MTV Video Music Awards | 2014 | "Royals" | Best Rock Video | Won | |
| MTV Video Music Awards | 2017 | Lorde | Artist of the Year | Nominated | |
| MTV Video Music Awards | 2017 | "Green Light" | Best Editing | Nominated | |
| MTV Video Music Awards | 2021 | "Solar Power" | Best Cinematography | Nominated | |
| MTV Video Music Awards | 2025 | "What Was That" | Song of the Year | Nominated | |
| MTV Video Music Awards | 2025 | Lorde | Best Pop Artist | Nominated | |
| MTV Video Music Awards | 2025 | "Man of the Year" | Best Art Direction | Nominated | |
| MTV Video Music Awards Japan | 2014 | "Royals" | Best New Artist Video | Nominated | |
| mtvU Woodie Awards | 2014 | Lorde | Woodie of the Year | Nominated | |
| mtvU Woodie Awards | 2015 | "Don't Tell 'Em" | Cover Woodie | Nominated | |
| Myx Music Awards | 2014 | "Royals" | Favorite International Video | Nominated | |
| Much Music Video Awards | 2014 | Lorde | Favorite International Artist/Group | Nominated | |
| Much Music Video Awards | 2014 | "Royals" | Best International Artist Video | Won | |
| Much Music Video Awards | 2017 | Lorde | Most Buzzworthy International Artist or Group | Nominated | |
| Much Music Video Awards | 2017 | Lorde | International Artist of the Year | Won | |
| Much Music Video Awards | 2017 | Lorde | Fan Fave International Artist or Group | Nominated | |
| New Zealand APRA Awards | 2013 | "Royals" | Silver Scroll Award | Won | |
| New Zealand APRA Awards | 2014 | "Royals" | Most Performed Work Overseas | Won | |
| New Zealand APRA Awards | 2014 | "Team" | Most Performed Work in New Zealand | Won | |
| New Zealand APRA Awards | 2015 | "Yellow Flicker Beat" | Silver Scroll Award | Nominated | |
| New Zealand APRA Awards | 2017 | "Green Light" | Silver Scroll Award | Won | |
| New Zealand Radio Awards | 2018 | Lorde: The Babysitter | Best Video | Won | |
| Nickelodeon Australian Kids' Choice Awards | 2014 | Lorde | Hot New Talent | Nominated | |
| Nickelodeon Australian Kids' Choice Awards | 2015 | Lorde | Favourite Aussie/Kiwi Music Act | Nominated | |
| NME Awards | 2014 | Lorde | Best Solo Artist | Nominated | |
| NME Awards | 2018 | Lorde | Best International Solo Artist | Won | |
| NME Awards | 2018 | Lorde | Best Live Artist | Nominated | |
| NME Awards | 2018 | Melodrama | Best Album | Nominated | |
| NME Awards | 2018 | "Green Light" | Best Track | Nominated | |
| NME Awards | 2022 | "Solar Power" | Best Song in the World | Won | |
| People's Choice Awards | 2014 | Lorde | Favorite Breakout Artist | Nominated | |
| Premios 40 Principales | 2014 | Lorde | Best International New Artist | Nominated | |
| Q Awards | 2014 | "Royals" | Best Track | Nominated | |
| Q Awards | 2017 | "Green Light" | Best Track | Nominated | |
| Q Awards | 2017 | Lorde | Best Live Act | Nominated | |
| Rolling Stone Australia Awards | 2014 | Pure Heroine | Album of the Year | Won | |
| Rolling Stone Australia Awards | 2014 | Lorde | Best New Talent | Won | |
| Rolling Stone New Zealand Awards | 2022 | "Solar Power" | Best Single | Nominated | |
| Rolling Stone New Zealand Awards | 2022 | Lorde | Rolling Stone Global Award | Won | |
| RTHK International Pop Poll Awards | 2014 | "Royals" | Top Ten International Songs | Won | |
| RTHK International Pop Poll Awards | 2014 | Lorde | Top New Act | Gold | |
| Taite Music Prize | 2014 | Pure Heroine | Taite Music Prize | Won | |
| Teen Choice Awards | 2014 | Lorde | Choice Female Artist | Nominated | |
| Teen Choice Awards | 2014 | "Team" | Choice Single by a Female Artist | Nominated | |
| Teen Choice Awards | 2017 | "Green Light" | Choice Music: Rock/Alternative Song | Nominated | |
| Teen Choice Awards | 2017 | Lorde | Choice Summer Female Artist | Nominated | |
| UK Music Video Awards | 2016 | "Magnets" (with Disclosure) | Best Dance Video – UK | Nominated | |
| UK Music Video Awards | 2017 | "Green Light" | Best Pop Video – International | Nominated | |
| UK Music Video Awards | 2025 | "Hammer" | Best Alternative Video – International | Nominated | |
| Variety's Power of Women | 2021 | Lorde | Power of Women Award | Won | |
| World Music Awards | 2014 | Lorde | Best Female Artist | Nominated | |
| World Music Awards | 2014 | Lorde | Best New Artist | Won | |
| World Music Awards | 2014 | Lorde | Best Live Act | Nominated | |
| World Music Awards | 2014 | Lorde | Entertainer of the Year | Nominated | |
| World Music Awards | 2014 | Lorde | Best Alternative Act | Won | |
| World Music Awards | 2014 | Lorde | Best-selling Australasian Artist | Won | |
| World Music Awards | 2014 | "Royals" | Best Song | Nominated | |
| World Music Awards | 2014 | "Team" | Best Song | Nominated | |
| World Music Awards | 2014 | "Tennis Court" | Best Song | Nominated | |
| World Music Awards | 2014 | "The Love Club" | Best Song | Nominated | |
| World Music Awards | 2014 | The Love Club EP | Best Album | Nominated | |
| World Music Awards | 2014 | Pure Heroine | Best Album | Nominated | |
| World Music Awards | 2014 | "Royals" | Best Video | Nominated | |
| World Music Awards | 2014 | "Team" | Best Video | Nominated | |
| World Music Awards | 2014 | "Tennis Court" | Best Video | Nominated | |
| Žebřík Music Awards | 2013 | Lorde | Best International Discovery | Won | |
| Žebřík Music Awards | 2017 | Lorde | Best International Female | Nominated | |
| Žebřík Music Awards | 2017 | Melodrama | Best International Album | Nominated | |
