= Swingin Party =

1985 song by The Replacements

Song by The Replacements

from the album Tim
- Published: 1985
- Genre: Jangle pop
- Length: 3:53
- Label: Sire
- Songwriter: Paul Westerberg
- Producer: Tommy Ramone

"Swingin Party" is a song written by Paul Westerberg and recorded by his band The Replacements for their fourth studio album Tim (1985). The song is an indie rock and rock and roll ballad with influences from jazz, country and new wave. Lyrically, it portrays the protagonist's "feigned nonchalance". It was well received by music critics, who praised Westerberg's songwriting talent. The song has been covered by other artists, notably Kindness in 2009 and Lorde in 2013.

== Composition ==
"Swingin Party"
Instrumented by electric guitar, the indie rock and rock and roll song is influenced by jazz, country and new wave music.

"Swingin Party" was written by Paul Westerberg and produced by Tommy Ramone, and was recorded by The Replacements. It is an indie rock and rock and roll ballad with influences from jazz, country and new wave. It features staccato chords instrumented by electric guitar. Paul Westerberg was inspired to write the song after listening to a live bootleg of Buffalo Springfield's "Flying on the Ground is Wrong" (1966) on a communal Walkman. According to Bill Janovitz from AllMusic, the song climbs scales in a way reminiscent of "Somethin' Stupid" (1967) by Frank Sinatra and Nancy Sinatra. The lyrics are introspective, and portray the protagonist's "feigned nonchalance".

Writing for Spin, editor J.D. opined that the song's theme is "literary reflections" as Westerberg sings, "Quittin' school and goin' to work and never goin' fishin'". According to Tim Holmes of Rolling Stone, the song's theme is that "life is a lilting series of ultimately empty, but nonetheless compulsory, soirees", while Robert Hilburn from the Los Angeles Times wrote that the song is "about loneliness and youthful insecurity". In an interview for the Los Angeles Times, Westerberg said: "One of the reasons we used to drink so much is that it was scary going up on stage. That's one of the things 'Swingin' Party' is all about on the album ... how it is a little frightening to put yourself on display all the time."

== Critical reception ==
"Swingin Party" received positive reviews from music critics, most of whom praised Westerberg's songwriting credits for the track. PopMatters' Michael Keefe lauded Westerberg's songwriting ability on "Swingin Party". Craig Rosen writing for Billboard opined that the song showcased Westerberg's "capable" songwriting for the band. In a separate journal for the same publication, Braoley Bambarger named "Swingin Party" a "bittersweet" ballad that "won the hearts of a generation of college radio fans". Craig Marks from Spin shared that the song's line "Bring your own lampshade/ Somewhere there's a party" is the third best lyric written by Westerberg for The Replacements. Tim Nelson from BBC Music selected "Swingin Party" as one of the outstanding tracks from Tim.

== Other versions ==
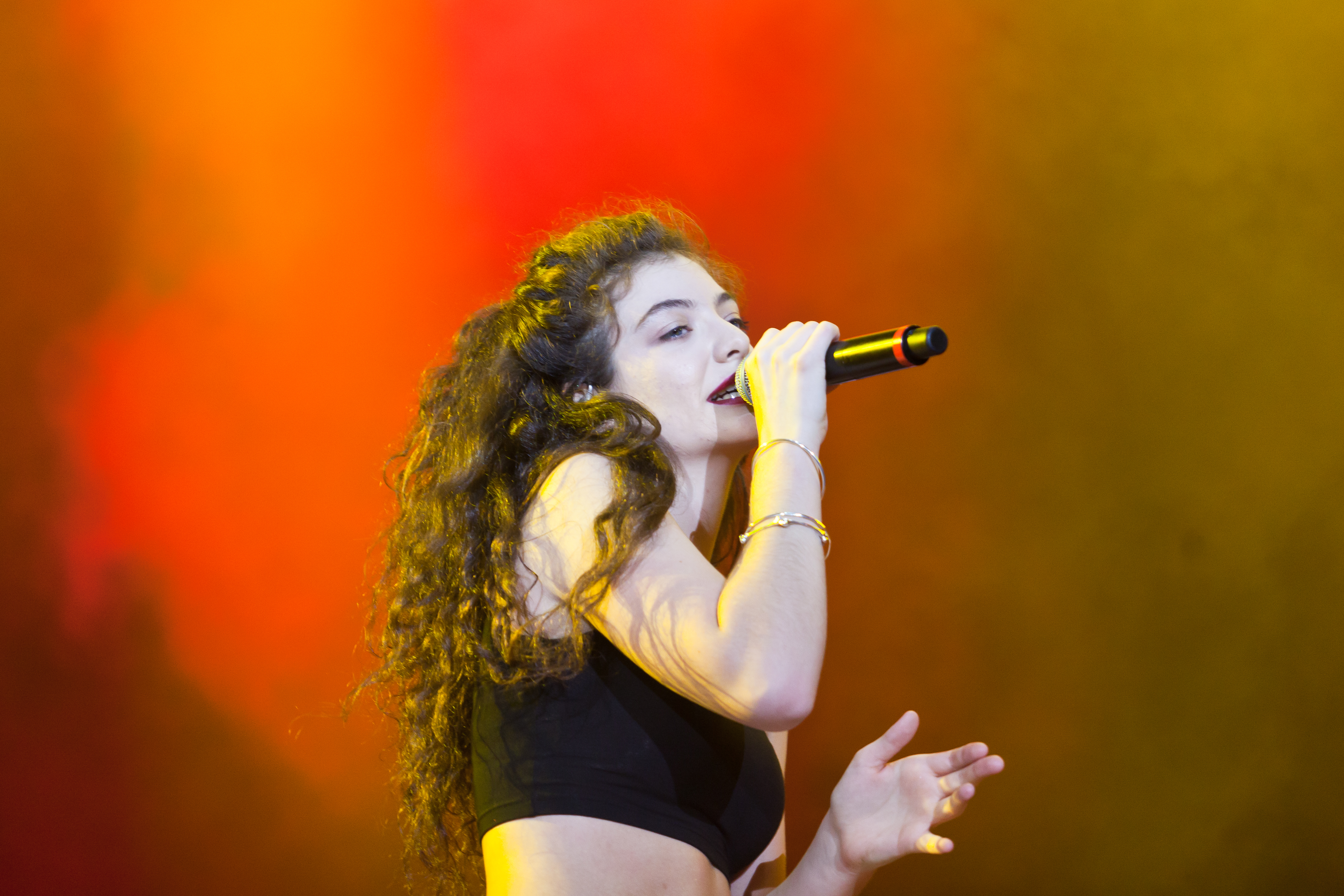
New Zealand singer Lorde (pictured) covered "Swingin Party" in 2013.

=== Popland version ===
In 2000, Singaporean power pop band Popland covered "Swingin Party" for the tribute album Left of the Dial: A Pop Tribute to The Replacements.

=== The Weakerthans version ===
Canadian band The Weakerthans performed "Swingin Party" at the 2005 Winnipeg Folk Festival. American musician Annie Hayden included a cover on her 2005 album, The Enemy of Love. British musician Kindness released a house rendition of "Swingin Party" as his first single in 2009, which was later used for the soundtrack of the 2015 drama film Paper Towns. It was released as a 7-inch vinyl via Moshi Moshi Records, with an original song "Gee Up" as the B-side. It was included on his debut studio album World, You Need a Change of Mind (2012). A music video comprising clips from educational films and travel videos was released in August 2009.

=== Lorde version ===
New Zealand singer Lorde covered "Swingin Party" as the B-side to her second single, "Tennis Court" (2013). It was also included on Tennis Court EP and later on the US iTunes Store version of The Love Club EP (2013). Lorde's cover of "Swingin Party" entered the New Zealand Singles Chart on June 17, 2013, at number ten, and dropped off the chart the following week. A live rendition was included on her EP Live in Concert. In December 2013, the cover was included in Lorde's extended edition of her debut studio album Pure Heroine. Brittany Spanos from The Village Voice praised the cover and wrote that it helps Lorde express her "rich voice in all its glory".
