= Going South =

Going South or variants may refer to:

- Going South (1992 film) (Italian 'Verso Sud') Italian drama film
- Going South (2009 film) (French 'Plein Sud')
- Goin' South, 1978 Western Jack Nicholson film
- "Goin' South" (song), song by The Beach Boys
- Goin' Southbound song by Stan Ridgway 1989
- Going South (book), a 2021 memoir by Lorde

== See also ==
- Heading South (Vers le sud), 2005 French-Canadian drama film
- Gone South, music festival
