= Annie Hayden =

American singer-songwriter

Annie Hayden was one of four members of the 1990s indie rock band Spent. She later embarked on a solo career, releasing "The Rub" in 2001 and "The Enemy of Love" in 2005, both on Merge Records.

== Track listings ==
=== The Rub (2001) ===
1. "Start a Little Late" (2:49)
2. "Slip is Showing" (3:12)
3. "The Land of Nod" (1:39)
4. "Alone" (2:25)
5. "Wood and Glue" (3:51)
6. "Albatross" (3:05)
7. "Red Lines" (2:15)
8. "Guitar Lesson" (2:02)
9. "Sign of Your Love" (2:38)
10. "Pistol and Glasses" (2:15)
11. "Lovely to See" (7:51)
12. "untitled"

=== The Enemy of Love (2005) ===
1. "Cara Mia" (2:52)
2. "Hip Hurray" (3:40)
3. "Anytime" (1:14)
4. "Your Carnival" (3:09)
5. "Boos" (1:39)
6. "Weather" (2:54)
7. "Money Trouble" (2:49)
8. "Gray" (2:01)
9. "Swingin' Party" (3:36)
10. "Piano" (1:14)
11. "Wait For Returns" (3:37)
12. "Starring in the Movies" (3:02)
13. "Willie's Fortune" (4:12)
