= Spent (band) =

American indie rock band

- Origin: Jersey City, New Jersey, US
- Genre: Indie rock
- Years active: 1994–1997, 1999
- Label: Merge
- Past members: John King; Annie Hayden; Joe Weston; Ed Radich
- Website: AllMusic.com - Spent

Spent was an American Indie Rock band from Jersey City, New Jersey consisting of singer/guitarist John King, guitarist/singer/keyboardist Annie Hayden, bassist/occasional vocalist Joe Weston and drummer Ed Radich.

== History ==
Spent formed in the early 1990s in Jersey City, New Jersey. After releasing several EPs under various independent labels the band released their first full album. Songs of Drinking and Rebellion was released in March 1995 on Merge Records, an indie label formed by Mac McCaughan and Laura Ballance of Superchunk, a band that Spent toured with extensively throughout their career. In September 1996 the band released an EP entitled Umbrella Wars, which included a cover of Joe Walsh's "A Life of Illusion". Umbrella Wars served as a teaser for their next album released a month later in October 1996 entitled A Seat Beneath the Chairs. In 1997 John King joined Superchunk lead guitarist Jim Wilbur in a side project called Humidifier releasing the album Nothing Changes on Link Records. On July 21, 1997 the band officially split. In 1999 their last song "(I'll Clean Up) The Mess That You Are" appeared on the 10 year anniversary album of Merge Records called Oh, Merge. They did reform briefly to perform at XX Merge, the 20th anniversary celebration of the label. The band never received much attention outside of the 90's indie rock world.

== Discography ==
=== Albums ===
- Sorry About The Deformed Heart (split with Crop Circle Hoax and Lambchop) (Traumatone, 1993)
- Songs of Drinking and Rebellion (Merge, 1995)
- A Seat Beneath the Chairs (Merge, 1996)

=== EPs ===
- Keeping Secrets (Lactate Records, 1995)
- Sinking In (spinART Records, 1995)
- Umbrella Wars (Merge, 1996)
