= Songs of Drinking and Rebellion =

Studio album by Spent
- Released: March 6, 1995
- Recorded: December 1990, September–October 1994
- Genre: Indie rock
- Label: Merge Records
- Producer: Paul DiBenedetto

Spent chronology
Songs of Drinking and Rebellion (1995)	A Seat Beneath The Stairs (1996)

Professional ratings
Review scores
Source	Rating
AllMusic	link

Songs of Drinking and Rebellion is the first studio album released by the indie rock band Spent in 1995. The album was released on Merge Records and was followed by a tour with labelmates Superchunk. The album had no singles; however, a video for the song "View from a Staircase" was made.

== Track listing ==
1. Brewster Station – 3:03
2. Excuse Me While I Drink Myself to Death – 3:47
3. West – 2:35
4. Minty Ballad – 2:52
5. Sense of Decay – 4:27
6. Bottled Mouth – 2:53
7. Open Wide – 3:01
8. Landscaper – 1:51
9. Santa Claus to the Rescue – 1:36
10. View from a Staircase – 4:19
11. Halfshirt – 5:33
12. Ready OK – 3:59
13. Brighter Than Day – 3:18
