= Sonja Yelich =

New Zealand poet (born 1965)

- Born: 1965 (age 60–61); Auckland, New Zealand
- Education: University of Auckland
- Occupation: Poet
- Spouse: Vic O'Connor (m. 2017)
- Children: 4, including Ella and India
- Writing career
- Language: English

Sonja Yelich (Croatian: Jelić; born 1965) is a New Zealand poet. She is the mother of singer Lorde.

== Early life ==
Sonja Yelich (Croatian: Jelić) was born in Auckland, New Zealand in 1965, to an immigrant family from the region of Dalmatia. She studied literature at the University of Auckland and became a trained teacher.

== Career ==
Yelich's early poetry was included in AUP Poets 2 (2002). Her first collection of poems, Clung (Auckland University Press, 2004), won the 2005 Jessie Mackay Award for 'Best First Book of Poetry' at the New Zealand Book Awards. Her poems were chosen for the Best New Zealand Poems series in 2002, 2004, 2005 and 2008. She was also included in New New Zealand Poets in Performance (AUP, July 2008), a book that was released with an accompanying CD.

Yelich's second collection of poetry, Get Some (AUP, 2008) was a finalist in the New Zealand Post Book Awards. Get Some focuses on an American marine named "Edgar" who is serving in Iraq.

In 2010 Yelich received a Buddle Findlay Sargeson Fellowship (with Sarah Laing) that allowed her to write full-time in residence at the Sargeson Centre. The Centre is adjacent to the University of Auckland and recipients receive an annual stipend of NZ$40,000.

== Personal life ==
Yelich lives in Auckland with her husband Vic O'Connor. They have four children, including Ella (better known as Lorde) and India (known as Indy). In June 2014, the couple became engaged, and they married on 6 May 2017.

== Poetry collections ==
- AUP New Poets 2 (2002)
- Clung (2004)
- Get Some (2008)
