= Indy (musician) =

New Zealand singer and songwriter

- Born: India Rose Yelich-O'Connor; 1998 (age 27–28); Auckland, New Zealand
- Other names: Indy Yelich; India Yelich
- Occupations: Singer; songwriter; poet
- Mother: Sonja Yelich
- Relatives: Lorde (sister)
- Musical career
- Genres: Electropop; indie pop
- Instruments: Vocals; acoustic guitar
- Label: Mom + Pop Music

India Rose Yelich-O’Connor (born 1998), known professionally as Indy, is a New Zealand singer-songwriter and poet.

Indy has published two poetry collections, sticky notes (2018) and Dudette (2022). In September 2022, she began her music career as Indy with the single "Threads". She has released several singles which charted in New Zealand, as well as two EPs: Threads (2023) and Fame Is A Bedroom (2025).

== Early life ==
India Rose Yelich-O’Connor was born in Auckland in late 1998. She grew up with her family in the suburb of Devonport. She is the daughter of poet Sonja Yelich and sister of singer Lorde. At school, she performed in plays, and took an interest in English and Greek mythology. She describes her childhood as one spent outdoors, spending time at the beach and sneaking out at night.

From the age of 7 until 18, she pursued acting, but also had a love of music. She began writing music at age 6. Around the age of 18, Indy moved to Los Angeles to study acting, where she realised she was more interested in the writing and storytelling aspects of the craft. Within a year, Indy moved to New York to pursue music, and lived in East Village for several years.

== Career ==
=== 2018–2022: Early career ===
Indy spent her teens involved in acting and writing. She posted poetry online via Instagram, performed in a cover band, and also began learning acoustic guitar, exploring her musical interests. On 24 February 2018, Indy published sticky notes, a collection of poems and her first written work. She also appeared in #poetry (2018), a documentary film by Ariel Bissett. That same year, Indy relocated to Los Angeles to continue pursuing acting, where she worked with Creative Artists Agency. However, she found it difficult to connect with scripts written by other writers and lacked a sense of passion, realising her interest was in storytelling. While attending a UMG afterparty in New York, following the 2018 Grammys, Indy met Max Movish who would later become her manager. She then relocated to New York to pursue a career as a singer-songwriter and continue her written work instead of acting.

In 2022, Indy published Dudette, her second collection of poetry, and had performed pieces at the Bowery Poetry Club. Indy had previously uploaded tracks onto Soundcloud for fun around 2018, but declined she was interested in a music career at the time. Her official debut as Indy was in September 2022, when she released the single "Threads" in advance of her first EP, followed shortly after by the single "Killer". "Threads" spent 2 weeks peaking at 11 on the NZ Hot 40 charts and 3 weeks peaking at 2 on the Hot 20 Aotearoa Singles charts, while "Killer" spent 1 week peaking at 19 on the latter chart.

=== 2023–present: Threads and Fame Is A Bedroom EPs ===
In January 2023, Indy released the single "Hometown", written at the house of Ryan Tedder, which charted on the Hot 20 Aotearoa Singles charts. It was Indy's first single after Movish became her manager, and the result of a session he had arranged with producers and writers. In February, she released the Threads EP. It was a culmination of four years of work and experimentation, and was inspired by her life experiences in her early 20s. She had worked with producer Phil Scully and musicians including Diplo, Trackside, and David Longstreth, to find her voice and develop her music.

From 2024 through to 2025, Indy released three more singles: "Savior", "East Coast", and "Sail Away". The latter two singles appeared on Hot 20 Aotearoa Singles charts for 1 week, at positions 4 and 13, respectively. In March 2025, Indy joined the label Mom + Pop. In July 2025, Indy released another single "Up In Flames (The Wayland)", in anticipation of the release of her second EP. On 1 August 2025, Indy released the Fame Is a Bedroom EP, which draws on themes from her interpersonal relationships, homesickness, and sense of self.

In 2026, Indy performed her first festival set at BottleRock Napa Valley Music Festival.

== Personal life ==
Indy plays acoustic guitar. She cites Bon Iver, James Taylor and Annie Lennox as artists whose music she is drawn to, and is inspired by Alex Dimitrov in her lyric writing. She was inspired to write through her mother, Sonja Yelich, and is also interested in the works of Enid Blyton and Jane Austen. She especially enjoys the poetry of Frank O'Hara, and also Elizabeth Bishop, May Swenson, and Morgan Parker, among others.

Indy spent several years living in New York after moving to the US aged 18. She states her favourite place in the city is MacDougal Street, and describes herself as a huge fan of the New York Knicks. In 2026, Indy relocated to Los Angeles.

In 2018, Indy said she had dealt with anxiety and panic attacks in her teens that caused her to wake up at night. She used these experiences to inform some of her poetry, and it has also inspired her songwriting, including the lyrics for the single "Killer". In various interviews, Indy has expressed trepidation about finding her own creative identity and the pressures of accomplishment, given the creative success of her family, particularly that of her sister Lorde. In 2022, she claimed it took her some time before she showed her family her music, and that it was important for her to "forge her own path". However, she has stated her relationship with Lorde is mutually supportive, and she has no issue with the public association.

In 2018, Indy came out as bisexual in a post on Instagram. The 2025 EP Fame Is A Bedroom explored this aspect of her identity, particularly the single "Sail Away".

== Written works ==
- Sticky Notes (2018) ISBN 978-1388639075
- Dudette (2022) ISBN 979-8210177292

== Discography ==
=== EPs ===
- Threads (2023)
- Fame Is A Bedroom (2025)

=== Singles ===
- "Threads" (2022)
- "Killer" (2022)
- "Hometown" (2023)
- "East Coast" (2024)
- "Savior" (2025)
- "Sail Away" (2025)
- "Up In Flames (The Wayland)" (2025)

== Concert tours ==
=== Opening act ===
- Love Hyperbole Live Tour (Alessia Cara) (2025)
