= Going South (book) =

2021 memoir and photobook by Lorde

- Authors: Ella Yelich-O'Connor; Harriet Were
- Language: English
- Genre: Memoir; photo-book
- Published: 4 June 2021
- Publication place: New Zealand
- Pages: 104

Going South is a 2021 memoir and photo-book by New Zealand singer and songwriter Lorde, published under her personal name, Ella Yelich-O'Connor. The book documents her experience visiting the continent of Antarctica for a week in January 2019, with accompanying photos taken by New Zealand photographer Harriet Were.

All proceeds from the book were used to fund a postgraduate scholarship created by Antarctica New Zealand, a government agency.

== Background and release ==
Yelich-O'Connor expressed an interest in exploring the region of Antarctica from an early age, noting an excursion to an aquarium as a child and learning about the Terra Nova Expedition as particularly sparking her interest. In January 2019, she was invited to visit Antarctica's Scott Base and McMurdo Station, travelling as an Antarctic Ambassador with Antarctica New Zealand. During her stay, she explored the Antarctic terrain, observed microscopic species in environmental laboratories and spoke with scientists.

Announced in November 2020 through her newsletter, Yelich-O'Connor described the book as a precursor to her then unreleased third studio album, describing the trip as "this great white palette cleanser, a sort of celestial foyer I had to move through in order to start making the next thing." The book is split into two parts; an opening 10-page essay written originally for Metro, followed by pages of photographs by Ware and footnotes from Yelich-O'Connor. On the inside of the book's back cover, the phrase "blink 3 times when you feel it kicking in" is printed, alluding to a line from "Solar Power", which was released less than two weeks after the book.
