= Lorde =

New Zealand singer-songwriter (born 1996)

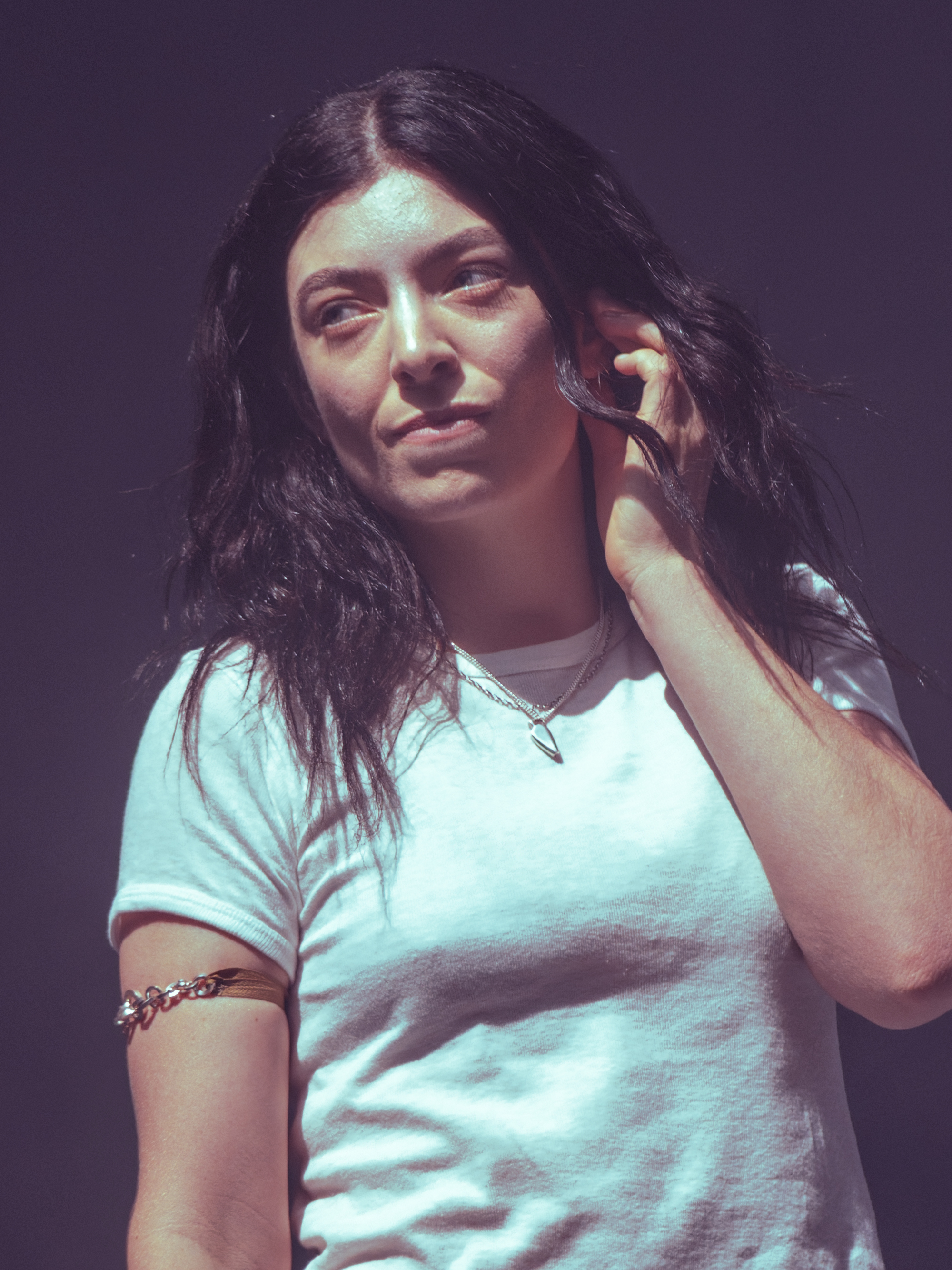
- Lorde in 2025
- Born: Ella Marija Lani Yelich-O'Connor; 7 November 1996 (age 30); Takapuna, Auckland, New Zealand
- Citizenship: New Zealand; Croatia
- Occupation: Singer-songwriter
- Years active: 2009–present
- Works: Discography; songs
- Mother: Sonja Yelich
- Relatives: Indy (sister)
- Awards: Full list
- Musical career
- Genres: Alternative pop; electropop; indie pop; synth-pop
- Instrument: Vocals
- Labels: UMG; Lava; Republic
- Website: www.lorde.co.nz

Ella Marija Lani Yelich-O'Connor (born 7 November 1996), known professionally as Lorde (/lɔːrd/ LORD), is a New Zealand singer-songwriter. An influential figure in alternative pop music, she is known for her unconventional production style and introspective songwriting.

Lorde first gained recognition as a teenager during a talent show performance. After signing with Universal Music Group (UMG), she began working with producer Joel Little and released the extended play (EP) The Love Club EP (2012). Her debut single, "Royals", topped the Billboard Hot 100, won two Grammy Awards, and became one of the best-selling singles of all time. Her debut studio album, Pure Heroine (2013), achieved further critical acclaim and commercial success. The following year, Lorde curated the soundtrack for the 2014 film The Hunger Games: Mockingjay – Part 1.

Lorde collaborated with producer Jack Antonoff on her next album, Melodrama (2017), which debuted atop the US Billboard 200 and has since been ranked among of the "500 Greatest Albums of All Time" by Rolling Stone. She explored indie folk and psychedelic styles on her third studio album, Solar Power (2021), before returning to an electronic-oriented sound for her fourth studio album, Virgin (2025).

Lorde's accolades include 20 Aotearoa Music Awards, two Grammy Awards, two Brit Awards, a Taite Music Prize and a nomination for a Golden Globe Award. She appeared in Time's list of the most influential teenagers in 2013 and 2014, and the 2014 edition of Forbes 30 Under 30. In addition to her solo work, she has co-written songs for other artists, including Broods and Bleachers.

== Life and career ==
=== 1996–2008: Early life ===
Ella Marija Lani Yelich-O'Connor was born on 7 November 1996 in Takapuna, a suburb of Auckland, New Zealand, to poet Sonja Yelich (Croatian: Jelić) and civil engineer Vic O'Connor. Her mother was born to Croatian immigrants from the region of Dalmatia, while her father is of Irish descent. They announced their engagement in 2014, after a 30-year relationship, and they married in a 2017 private ceremony on Cheltenham Beach. Lorde holds dual New Zealand and Croatian citizenship.

Lorde is the second of four children: she has an elder sister Jerry, a younger sister India, and a younger brother Angelo. They were raised in Auckland's North Shore suburbs of Devonport and Bayswater. At age five, she joined a drama group and developed public speaking skills. Her mother encouraged her to read a range of genres, which Lorde cited as a lyrical influence. More specifically, she cites the young adult dystopian novel Feed (2002) by M. T. Anderson as well as authors J. D. Salinger, Raymond Carver and Janet Frame for influencing her songwriting.

After a suggestion from a teacher at her school, her mother had her take the Woodcock–Johnson Tests of Cognitive Abilities to determine her intelligence. The results concluded that Lorde, age six, was a gifted child. She was briefly enrolled at George Parkyn Centre, a gifted education organisation. Sonja unenrolled her, however, citing social development concerns. As a child, Lorde attended Vauxhall School and then Belmont Intermediate School. While attending Vauxhall, she placed third and first respectively in the North Shore Primary Schools' Speech competition, a national contest, in 2006 and 2007.

=== 2009–2012: Career beginnings ===
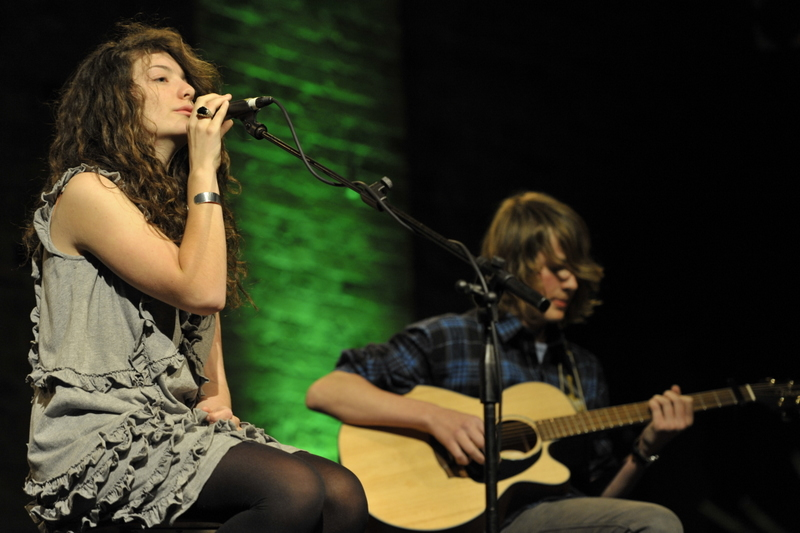
Lorde performing at the Victoria Theatre in 2010

Lorde and her Belmont team were named the runner-up in the 2009 Kids' Lit Quiz World Finals, a global literature competition for students aged 10 to 14. In May 2009, Lorde and her friend Louis McDonald won the Belmont Intermediate School annual talent show as a duo. In August that year, Lorde and McDonald made a guest appearance on Jim Mora's Afternoons show on Radio New Zealand. There, they performed covers of Pixie Lott's "Mama Do (Uh Oh, Uh Oh)" and Kings of Leon's "Use Somebody". McDonald's father then sent his recordings of the duo covering "Mama Do" and Duffy's "Warwick Avenue" to Universal Music Group (UMG)'s A&R executive Scott Maclachlan. Maclachlan subsequently signed her to UMG for development.

Lorde was also part of the Belmont Intermediate School band Extreme; the band placed third in the North Shore Battle of the Bands finals at the Bruce Mason Centre, Takapuna, Auckland on 18 November 2009. In 2010, Lorde and McDonald formed a duet called "Ella & Louis" and performed covers live on a regular basis at local venues, including cafés in Auckland and the Victoria Theatre in Devonport. In 2011, UMG hired vocal coach Frances Dickinson to give her singing lessons twice a week for a year. During this time, Maclachlan attempted to partner Lorde with several different producers and songwriters, but without success. As she began writing songs, she learned how to "put words together" by reading short fiction.

Lorde performed her original songs for the first time at the Victoria Theatre in November 2011. In December, Maclachlan paired Lorde with Joel Little, a songwriter, record producer, and former Goodnight Nurse lead singer. The pair recorded five songs for an extended play (EP) at Little's Golden Age Studios in Morningside, Auckland, and finished within three weeks. While working on her music career, she attended Takapuna Grammar School from 2010 to 2013, completing Year 12. She later chose not to return in 2014 to attend Year 13.

=== 2013–2015: Pure Heroine ===
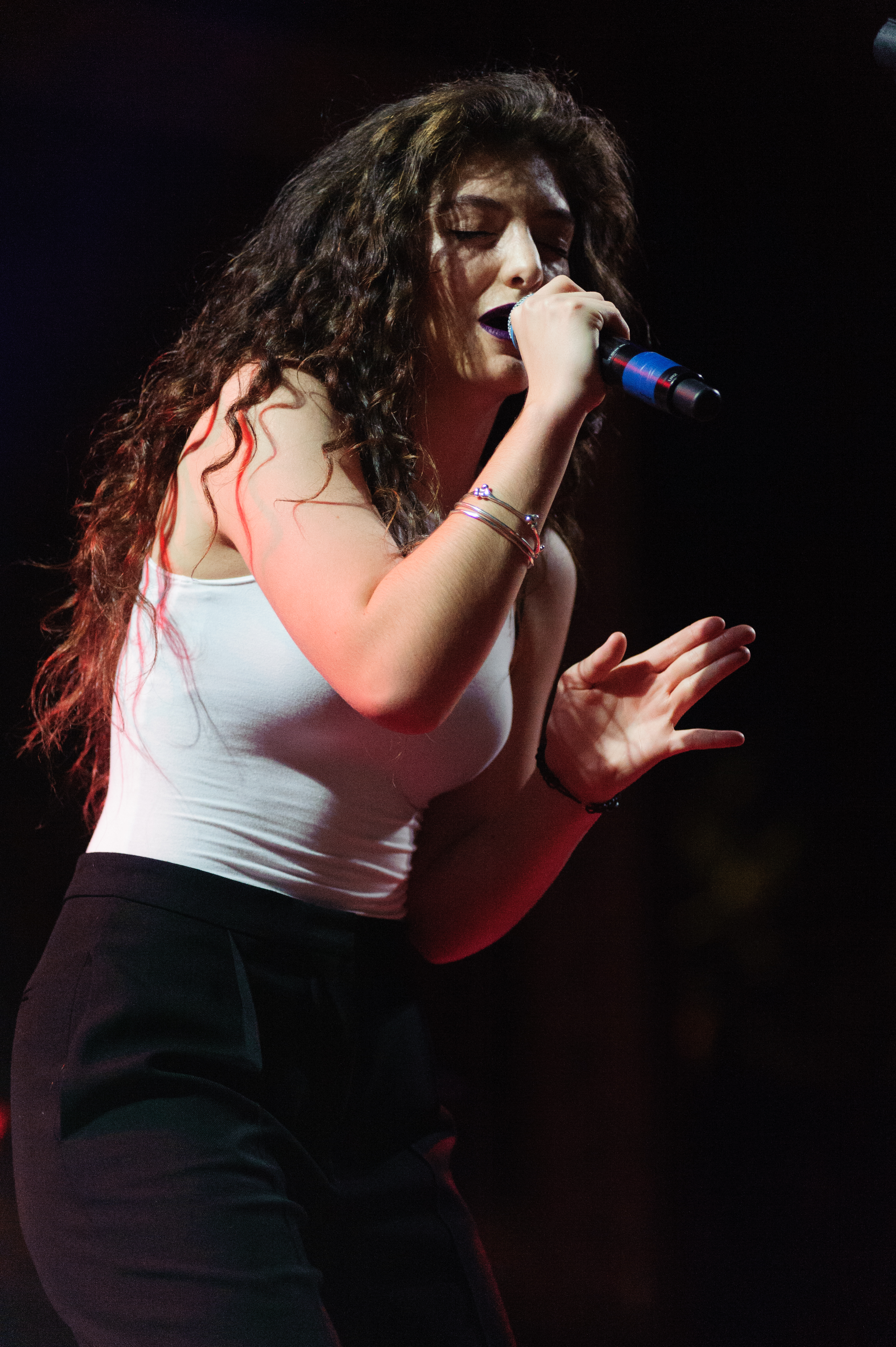
Lorde performing at Coachella in 2014

When Lorde and Little had finished their first collaborative effort, The Love Club EP, Maclachlan applauded it as a "strong piece of music", but worried if the EP could profit because Lorde was obscure at the time. In November 2012, the singer self-released the EP through her SoundCloud account for free download. UMG commercially released The Love Club in March 2013 after it had been downloaded 60,000 times, signalling that Lorde had attracted a broad audience. It peaked at number two in New Zealand and Australia. "Royals", the EP's lead single, helped Lorde rise to prominence after it became a critical and commercial success, selling more than 10 million units worldwide. It peaked at number one on the Billboard Hot 100, making Lorde, then 16 years old, the youngest artist to earn a number-one single in the United States since Tiffany in 1987. As of June 2026, the track has been certified 15-times platinum (i.e. 1 diamond and 5 platinum certifications) in the US by the Recording Industry Association of America. It won two Grammy Awards for Best Pop Solo Performance and Song of the Year at the 56th ceremony, and was named Single of the Year at the 2013 New Zealand Music Awards. From late 2013 to early 2016, Lorde was in a relationship with New Zealand photographer James Lowe.

Lorde's debut studio album Pure Heroine, which contained the single "Royals", was released in September 2013 to critical acclaim; it appeared on several year-end best album lists. The album received considerable attention for its portrayal of suburban teenage disillusionment and critiques of mainstream culture. In the United States, the album sold more than one million copies by February 2014, becoming the first debut album by a female artist since Adele's 19 (2008) to achieve the feat. Pure Heroine earned a Grammy nomination for Best Pop Vocal Album and won the 2014 Taite Music Prize for the best New Zealand album of 2013; it had sold six million copies worldwide as of June 2021. Three other singles were released from the album: "Tennis Court" reached number one in New Zealand, while "Team" charted at number six in the United States, and "Glory and Gore" was released exclusively to US radio. At the 2014 New Zealand Music Awards, Lorde won six awards: Album of the Year and Best Pop Album for Pure Heroine, Single of the Year for "Team", Highest Selling New Zealand Single for "Royals", Best Female Solo Artist, and the International Achievement Award.

In November 2013, Lorde signed a publishing deal with Songs Music Publishing, worth a reported US$2.5 million, after a bidding war between companies including Sony Music Entertainment and her label UMG. The agreement gave the publisher the right to license Lorde's music for films and advertising. Later that month, Lorde was featured on the soundtrack for the 2013 film The Hunger Games: Catching Fire, performing a cover of Tears for Fears' 1985 song "Everybody Wants to Rule the World". Time included her on their lists of the most influential teenagers in the world in 2013 and 2014. Forbes also placed her on their 2014 edition of 30 Under 30; she was the youngest individual to be featured. Billboard featured her on their 21 Under 21 list in 2013, 2014, and 2015.

In the first half of 2014, Lorde performed at several music festivals, including the Laneway Festival in Sydney, the three South American editions of Lollapalooza—Chile, Argentina, Brazil—and the Coachella Festival in California. She subsequently embarked on an international concert tour, commencing in North America in early 2014. Amidst her solo activities, Lorde joined the surviving members of Nirvana to perform "All Apologies" during the band's induction ceremony at the Rock and Roll Hall of Fame in April 2014. Band members Krist Novoselic and Dave Grohl explained that they selected Lorde because her songs represented "Nirvana aesthetics" through their perceptive lyrics. Lorde also curated the accompanying soundtrack for the 2014 film The Hunger Games: Mockingjay – Part 1, overseeing the selection of the album's content as well as recording four tracks, including its lead single "Yellow Flicker Beat". In 2015, the track earned Lorde a Golden Globe nomination for Best Original Song, and won Single of the Year at the 2015 New Zealand Music Awards, marking her third consecutive win in the category. Later that year, she was featured on British electronic duo Disclosure's song "Magnets" from their 2015 album Caracal.

=== 2016–2019: Melodrama ===
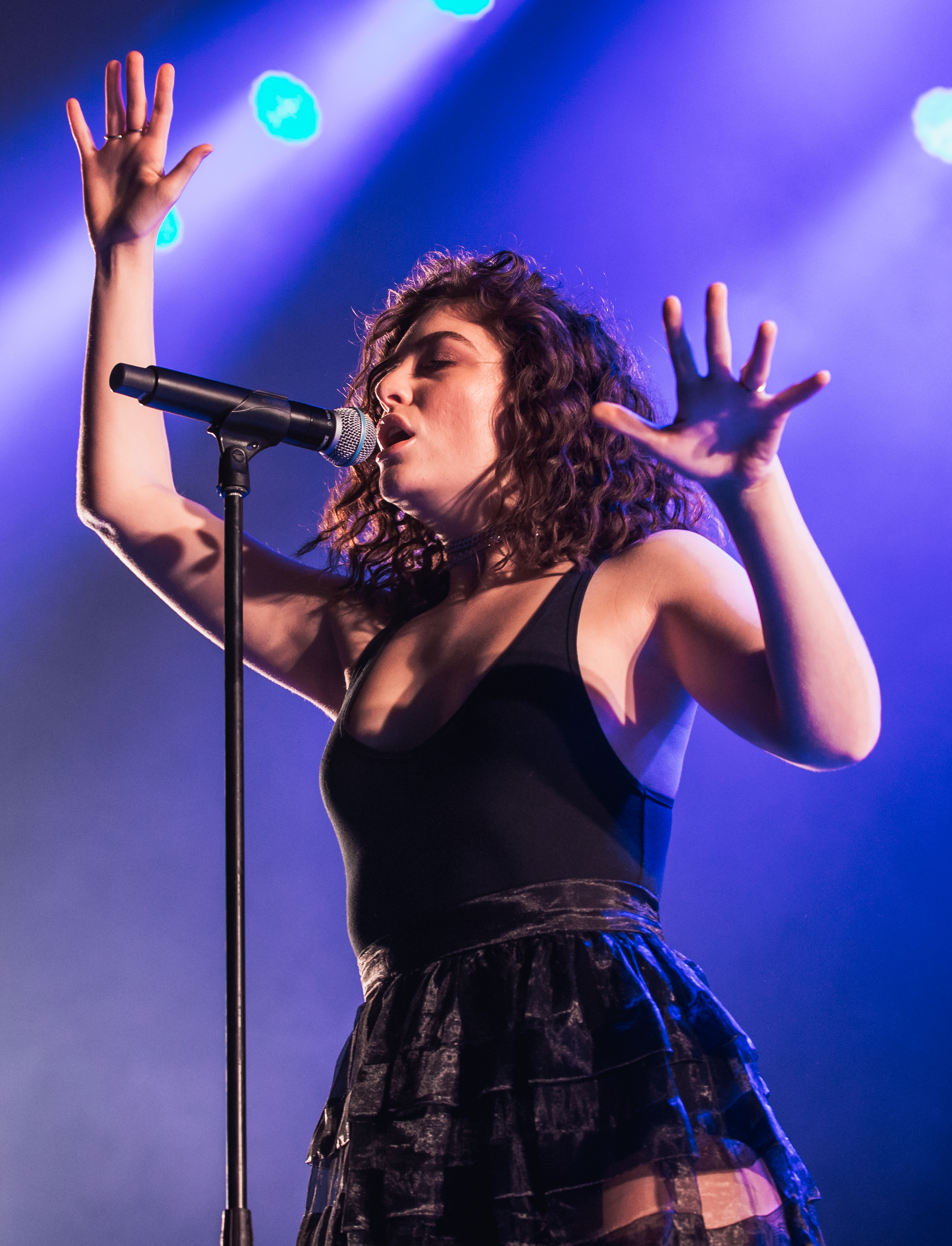
Lorde performing in 2017

In January 2016, Lorde relocated to Ponsonby, an inner-city suburb of Auckland. At the 2016 Brit Awards in February, Lorde and David Bowie's final touring band gave a tribute performance of his 1971 song "Life on Mars". Pianist Mike Garson, a frequent band member for Bowie, explained that Bowie's family and management selected Lorde because he admired her and felt she was "the future of music". Her cover was widely acknowledged as one of the finest performances in tribute to Bowie. Later that year, Lorde co-wrote "Heartlines", a song by New Zealand music duo Broods from their 2016 album Conscious.

The lead single from her second studio album Melodrama, "Green Light", was released in March 2017 to critical acclaim; it was ranked as the best song of the year by NME and The Guardian. The single reached number one in New Zealand, number four in Australia, number nine in Canada, and number nineteen in the United States. The album was supported by two other singles: "Perfect Places" and a remix of "Homemade Dynamite" featuring Khalid, Post Malone and SZA. Produced mainly by Lorde and Jack Antonoff, Melodrama was released on 16 June 2017. Debuting atop the US Billboard 200 chart, the album became Lorde's first US chart topper; it also reached number one in Australia, Canada and New Zealand.

Melodrama explores heartbreak and messy feelings of late adolescence, evoked by a breakup. It received widespread critical acclaim for the emotional weight of Lorde's songwriting and Antonoff's pop production styles; Metacritic placed it second on their list of the best albums of 2017 based on publications' year-end lists, behind Kendrick Lamar's Damn. Melodrama was nominated for Album of the Year at the 60th Annual Grammy Awards. At the 2017 New Zealand Music Awards, the album won Album of the Year, "Green Light" won Single of the Year, and Lorde won Best Solo Artist, Best Pop Artist, the People's Choice Award and the International Achievement Award.

Lorde co-wrote and provided background vocals for American indie pop band Bleachers's song "Don't Take the Money", released in March 2017. To promote Melodrama, she embarked on the Melodrama World Tour (2017–2018), with Khalid, Run the Jewels, Mitski, and Tove Styrke as opening acts. In December 2017, Lorde cancelled her scheduled June 2018 concert in Israel, following an online campaign by Palestinian solidarity activists supporting the Boycott, Divestment and Sanctions campaign. While Lorde did not explicitly indicate her reasons for the cancellation, she said that she had been unaware of the political turmoil there. The decision was welcomed by pro-Palestine groups and criticised by pro-Israel groups. Billboard included Lorde on their 2017 edition of 21 Under 21, while Forbes included her in their 30 Under 30 Asia list.

=== 2020–2023: Solar Power ===
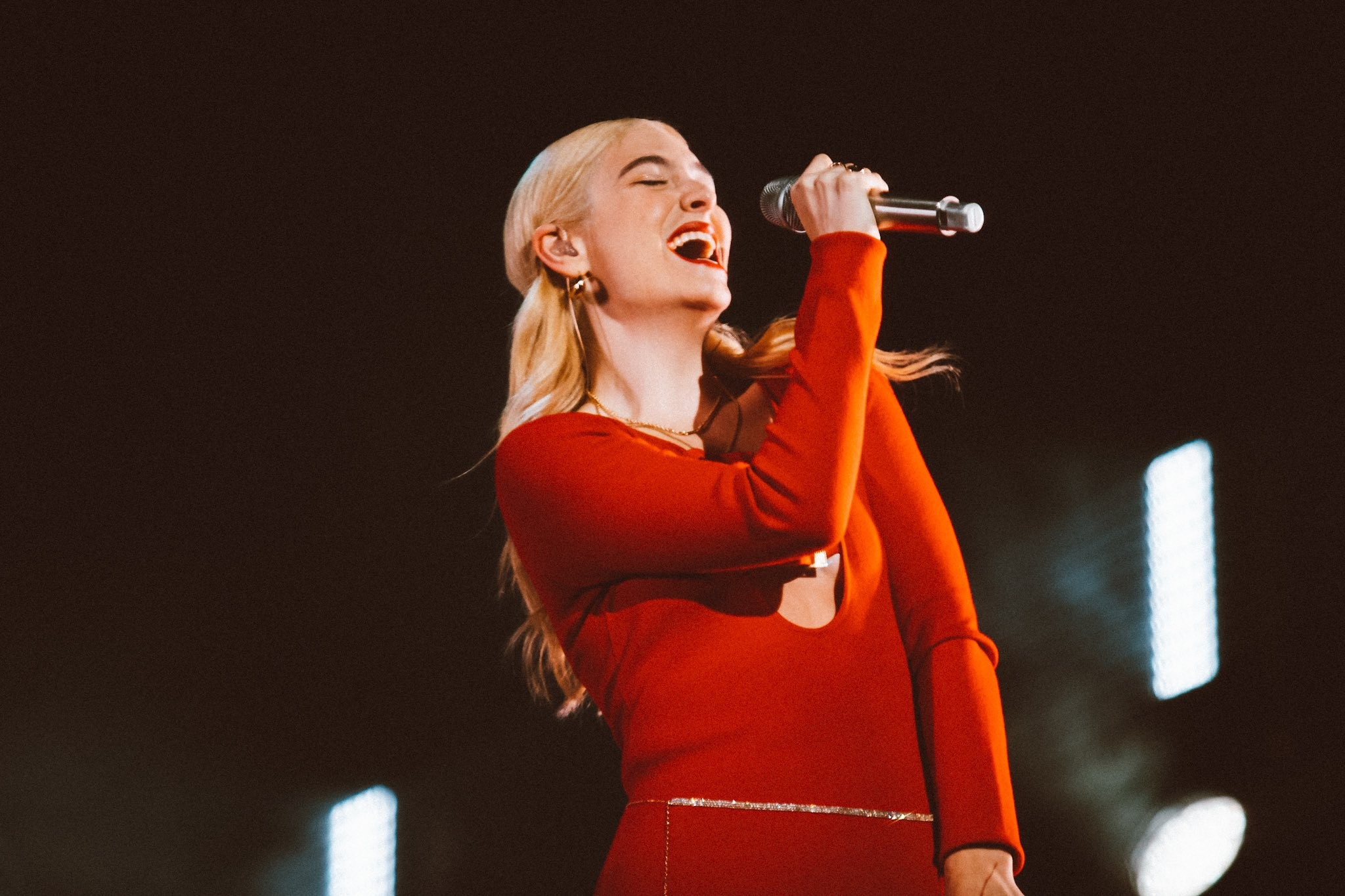
Lorde performing on her Solar Power Tour at the Primavera Sound of São Paulo, November 2022

Lorde revealed on 20 May 2020 that she started working on her third studio album with Antonoff following the death of her dog. In November 2020, she announced the release of Going South, a book documenting her January 2019 visit to Antarctica with photos taken by photographer Harriet Were.

Lorde's third studio album, Solar Power, was released on 20 August 2021. Its acoustic, indie folk-inspired sound was a departure from her previous electropop albums, which polarised critics. One year after the album's release, she reflected that the reaction to Solar Power was "really confounding" and "painful". The album peaked at number one in Australia and New Zealand. It was supported by three singles: "Solar Power", which reached number two in New Zealand, "Stoned at the Nail Salon", and "Mood Ring". Lorde promoted the album on the Solar Power Tour (2022–2023). She headlined Primavera Sound 2022 in Spain in June, as well as the festival's Brazil edition in November 2022.

Lorde released Te Ao Mārama on 9 September 2021, as a companion piece to Solar Power. The EP is sung entirely in Te Reo Māori, and was translated by Hana Mereraiha. Other translators included Sir Tīmoti Kāretu and Hēmi Kelly. The project was led by Dame Hinewehi Mohi. All proceeds from the album are going towards two New Zealand-based charities: Forest & Bird and Te Hua Kawariki. In August 2023, Lorde debuted the songs "Silver Moon" and "Invisible Ink" during her concert at the Boardmasters Festival in Cornwall, England. She continued her festival run with performances throughout the month at Øyafestivalen, Sziget Festival and Flow Festival.

=== 2024–present: Virgin ===
In 2024, Lorde released a cover of Talking Heads' "Take Me to the River" as the third single from the A24 Music tribute album Everyone's Getting Involved: A Tribute to Talking Heads' Stop Making Sense. Later that year, Jennifer Knoepfle, executive vice-president and co-head of A&R at Universal Music Publishing Group (UMPG) in the US, confirmed that Lorde had signed with the company earlier in the year. The remix of Charli XCX's "Girl, So Confusing" marked her first release as a songwriter for the label. The two performed the track live at Madison Square Garden in New York and at Coachella in April 2025. The release won the Aotearoa Music Award for Single of the Year.

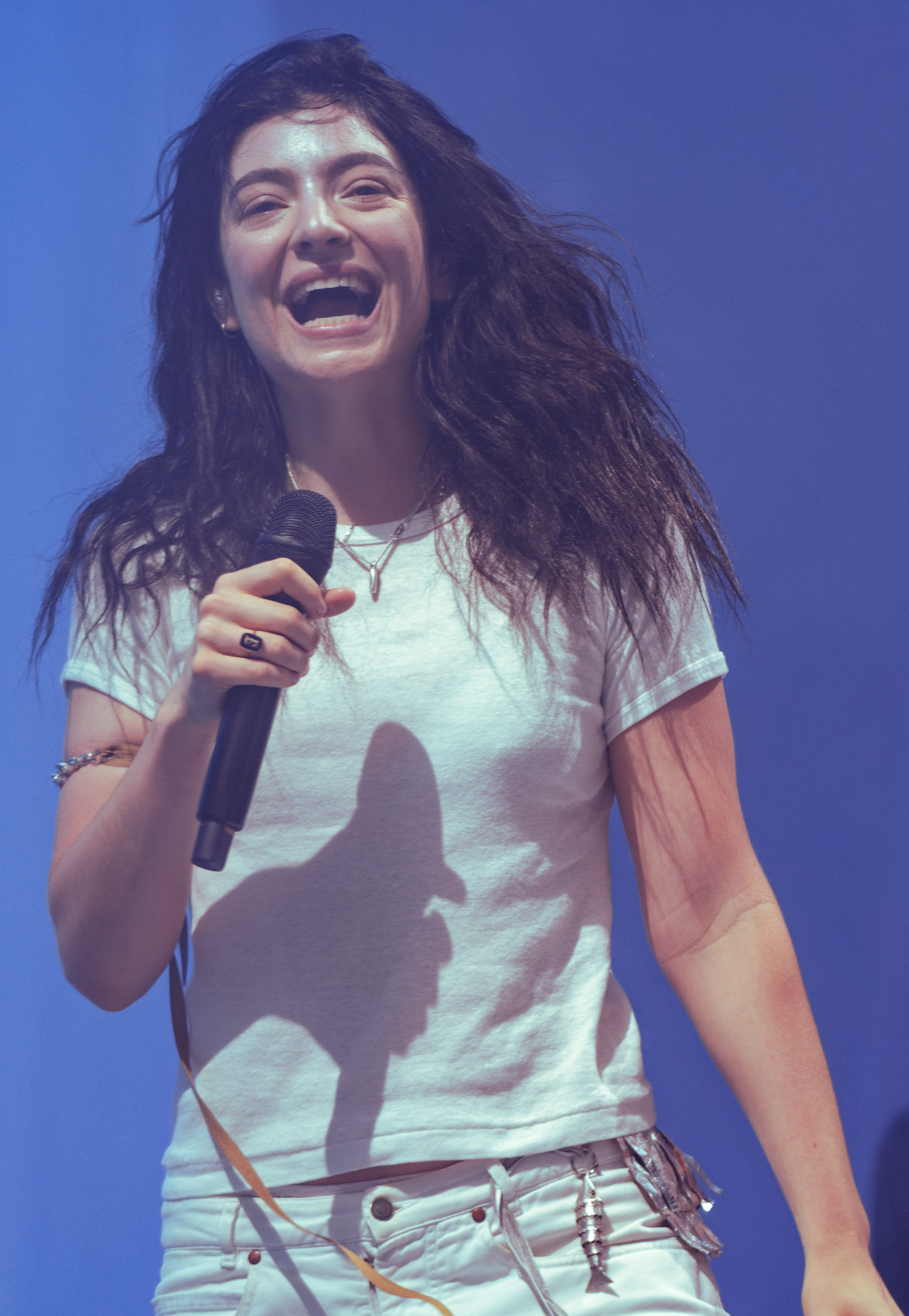
Lorde performing at the Glastonbury Festival (2025)

The lead single from Lorde's fourth studio album Virgin, titled "What Was That", was released in April 2025. The song reached number one in New Zealand and became her first top 10 in Australia and top 40 on the US Billboard Hot 100 since 2017. The album was released in June 2025 and spawned two further singles: "Man of the Year" and "Hammer". Virgin debuted at number one on the charts in New Zealand, Australia and the United Kingdom, and at number two on the US Billboard 200. With the release, Lorde became the first New Zealand artist to place six tracks simultaneously on the Aotearoa Music Charts. Co-produced with Jim-E Stack, the album returned to the electropop and synth-pop elements of her early work and received generally positive reviews, with particular praise for its emotional songwriting. On the day of release, Lorde performed the album in full during a surprise set at the Glastonbury Festival. At the 2026 Aotearoa Music Awards, Virgin earned four nominations, including Album of the Year, and won Best Pop Artist and International Achievement.

Reflecting on the personal transformation involved in the project, Lorde said the album had broken her apart and "forged a new creature". The album was promoted by the Ultrasound World Tour, with performances in arenas and festivals across North America, South America, Europe and Oceania. During a performance in New York, Lorde exclaimed "free fucking Palestine" in solidarity with Palestinians. Later, she removed her entire discography from Apple Music in Israel as part of the No Music for Genocide movement, in protest against the Israeli genocide in Gaza. Lorde's contract with UMG expired in December 2025. In voice messages sent to fans, she indicated that she might sign a new recording contract, possibly with her former label, but that she first wanted to experience working as an independent artist.

== Artistry ==
=== Influences ===
Lorde grew up listening to American jazz and soul musicians Billie Holiday, Sam Cooke, Etta James, and Otis Redding, whose music she admires for "harvesting their suffering". She also listened to her parents' favourite records by musicians including Cat Stevens, Neil Young, and Fleetwood Mac in her early years. During production of Pure Heroine, Lorde cited influences from electronic music producers, including SBTRKT, Grimes, and Sleigh Bells, impressed by "their vocals in a really interesting way, whether it might be chopping up a vocal part or really lash or layering a vocal." She also stated that she was inspired by the initially hidden identities of Burial and the Weeknd, explaining, "I feel like mystery is more interesting." Other inspirations include Katy Perry, Grace Jones, James Blake, Yeasayer, Animal Collective, Bon Iver, the Smiths, Arcade Fire, Laurie Anderson, Kanye West, Prince, and David Bowie.

Lyrically, Lorde cited her mother, a poet, as the primary influence for her songwriting. She also named several authors and poets, including Kurt Vonnegut, Raymond Carver, Wells Tower, Tobias Wolff, Claire Vaye Watkins, Sylvia Plath, Walt Whitman, and T. S. Eliot as lyrical inspirations, particularly noting their sentence structures.

When writing her second album, Melodrama, Lorde took inspiration from the melodic styles of a variety of musicians, including the 1975–especially their song "Somebody Else", Phil Collins, Don Henley, Rihanna, Florence and the Machine, Tom Petty, Joni Mitchell, Leonard Cohen, and Robyn. During the recording process, she stated that Frank Ocean's 2016 album Blonde inspired her to eschew "traditional song structures". She frequently listened to Paul Simon's 1986 album Graceland while riding subways in New York City and on taxi rides on the way home from parties in her hometown of Auckland. She cited the 1950 science fiction short story "There Will Come Soft Rains" by Ray Bradbury as inspiration for much of Melodrama's story, relating it to her own realities she faced.

=== Musical styles and songwriting ===
"Royals" (2013)
Lorde's debut studio album Pure Heroine is characterized by a minimalist production, exemplified by the art pop and electropop single "Royals".

Music critics highlighted Lorde's pop sound as unconventional and her songwriting as introspective. In a 2017 interview with NME, she said, "I don't think about staying in my genre lane." Her music primarily incorporates electropop, alternative pop, synth-pop, and indie pop.

Pure Heroine explores minimalist electropop, art pop, dream pop, and indie-electro, with influences of hip-hop. Melodrama was a departure from the hip-hop-oriented minimalist style of its predecessor, incorporating synth-pop sounds composed of piano-based arrangements, maximalist synths and drum machine beats. Solar Power again abandoned maximalism for a minimalist sound, this time incorporating acoustic guitars and mellow melodies. Virgin returned to the synth-pop sound that had defined her early career, featuring synth-based arrangements with drum machine patterns, distorted synths, and electronic pulses.

Lorde possesses a contralto vocal range. Before Melodrama, Lorde only sang and did not play musical instruments on her records or onstage, saying, "[My] voice needs to have the focus. My vocal-scape is really important". PopMatters described Lorde's vocals as "unique and powerfully intriguing", while Billboard characterised her voice as "dynamic, smoky and restrained". For the Melodrama World Tour, however, she played a drum pad sampler, and xylophone onstage in some performances. Shortly after finishing her tour, Lorde said she had started learning to play the piano. Vice noted that her songs incorporated the mixolydian mode, a melodic structure used in "blues-based and alternative rock" music, which set her songs apart from those in pop music for not fitting a common major or minor chord.

Regarding her songwriting process, Lorde explained that the foundation to her songs began with the lyrics, which could sometimes stem from a singular word meant to summarise a specific idea she had tried to identify. For "Tennis Court", Lorde wrote the music before lyrics. She stated that the songwriting on Pure Heroine developed from the perspective of an observer. Similarly, in an interview with NME, Lorde acknowledged that she used words of inclusion throughout her debut album, while her follow-up Melodrama presented a shift to first-person narrative, employing more introspective lyrics inspired by Lorde's personal struggles post-breakup and viewpoints on post-teenage maturity. Lorde's neurological condition chromesthesia influenced her songwriting on the album; it led her to arrange colours according to each song's theme and emotion.

== Public image and impact ==
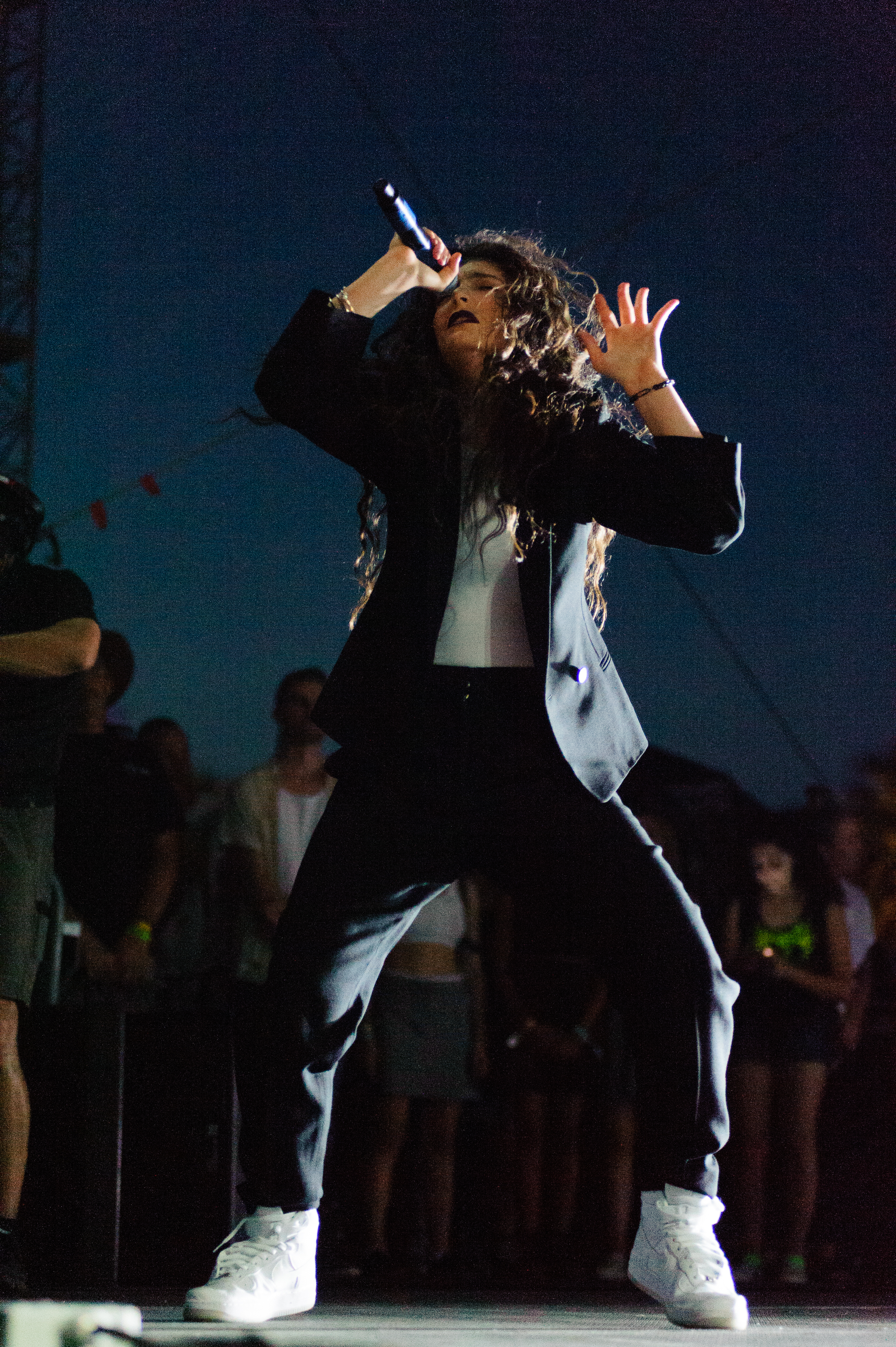
Lorde is known for her unchoreographed dancing onstage.

Lorde's stage name illustrates her fascination with "royals and aristocracy"; she added an "e" after the name Lord, which she felt was too masculine, to make it more feminine. She described her public image as something that "naturally" came to her and was identical to her real-life personality. Lorde identifies as a feminist. The New Zealand Herald opined that her feminist ideology was different from her contemporaries due to Lorde's lack of interest in sexualised performances. She proclaimed herself in an interview with V magazine as a "hugely sex-positive person", saying, "I have nothing against anyone getting naked. ... I just don't think it really would complement my music in any way or help me tell a story any better".

Critical reception of Lorde is generally positive, with praise concentrated on her maturity both musically and lyrically. The New York Times called her "the pop prodigy" who was not conformed to boundaries and always sought experimentation. Billboard recognised Lorde as a spokesperson for a "female rock resurgence" by introducing her works to rock and alternative radio, which had seen a traditional male dominance. The publication also named her the "New Queen of Alternative" in a 2013 cover story. Journalist Robert Christgau was less enthusiastic towards Lorde's styles, labelling the singer as "a pop property" that was indistinguishable from other mainstream artists.

Lorde's critiques of mainstream culture on Pure Heroine earned her the title "the voice of her generation", a label she dismissed, saying that "young people have never needed a specialised spokesperson". Jon Caramanica, writing for The New York Times, credited Lorde for bringing forth a "wave of female rebellion" to mainstream audiences that embraced an "anti-pop" sentiment. Sharing a similar viewpoint, Rolling Stone and NPR credited her debut studio album Pure Heroine as the foundation of that transformation. Several analysts also noted Lorde's influence on the music trends of the 2010s, and have credited the singer with paving the way for the current generation of alternative-leaning pop artists. She placed at number 12 on NPR's 2018 readers poll of the most influential female musicians of the 21st century. Billboard ranked her number 44 on its list of the "Top 100 Women Artists of the 21st Century" in 2025. Her work has influenced various artists, including Billie Eilish, Olivia Rodrigo, Sabrina Carpenter, Conan Gray, Chappell Roan, and Troye Sivan.

Her onstage persona, particularly her signature unchoreographed dancing, has polarised audiences. Her detractors have described her dance moves as "awkward" in comparison to other stage performers. The Fader said she should be celebrated for her dancing as it is "more freeform and spontaneous" than structured choreography and "speaks an entirely different expressive language". The publication further elaborated that her "stage presence [is] more impactful than the average pop performance". Lorde was parodied in the South Park episodes "The Cissy" and "Rehash", broadcast in October and December 2014, respectively.

During the buildup to, and during the rollout of Lorde's fourth album Virgin, her gender identity was speculated on, following a shifting in her dress sense, as well as posts on social media. Lorde later told Emma Chamberlain in an interview at the 2025 Met Gala that she felt "like a man and a woman", and later revealed to Rolling Stone that she identifies as "in the middle, gender-wise." In the same interview, she described herself as a "wealthy, cis, white woman" while discussing trans rights and the privilege her identity confers.

== Philanthropy ==
Lorde has been involved in several philanthropic causes. "The Love Club" was included in the 2013 charity album Songs for the Philippines to support the people in the Philippines who suffered from Typhoon Haiyan. In 2015, Lorde recorded "Team Ball Player Thing", a charity single, as part of the supergroup Kiwis Cure Batten. All sales from the song went towards research for the cure of Batten disease, a fatal neurodegenerative disorder. Later that year, the singer was featured in the compilation album The Art of Peace: Songs for Tibet II to raise funds for the preservation of the Tibetan culture. The following year, Lorde made a NZ$20,000 donation to Fuel the Need, a New Zealand charity that provides lunches for underprivileged schoolchildren. In 2018, she donated NZ$5,000 to Starship Hospital to fund the purchase of "five new portable neurology monitors". Lorde became a patron of MusicHelps, formerly the New Zealand Music Foundation, a musical charity helping New Zealanders who are vulnerable to or experiencing serious health issues, in November 2018. In January 2026, she donated $204,000 to the Minnesota Immigration Rights Action Committee and Immigrant Defense Network.

== Achievements ==
After her breakthrough, Lorde won four New Zealand Music Awards at the 2013 ceremony. The single "Royals" earned the APRA Silver Scroll Award, and two Grammy Awards for Best Pop Solo Performance and Song of the Year. In 2015, she received a Golden Globe nomination for Best Original Song as a songwriter for "Yellow Flicker Beat". Her second studio album Melodrama received a Grammy nomination for Album of the Year at the 60th ceremony. Lorde has received two Brit Awards for International Female Solo Artist. The singer has also won two Billboard Music Awards, one MTV Video Music Award and three World Music Awards. She had sold over five million albums worldwide as of June 2017 and 37 million certified single units in the United States.

== Discography ==
- Pure Heroine (2013)
- Melodrama (2017)
- Solar Power (2021)
- Virgin (2025)

== Written works ==
- Going South (2021)

== Filmography ==
List of television appearances
Year	Title	Role	Notes
2017	Saturday Night Live	Herself	Episode: "Scarlett Johansson / Lorde" (Note: Lorde makes a cameo appearance as herself on the skit "A Sketch for Women".)

== Tours ==
- Pure Heroine Tour (2013–2014)
- Melodrama World Tour (2017–2018)
- Solar Power Tour (2022–2023)
- Ultrasound World Tour (2025–2026)

== See also ==
- List of New Zealand Grammy Award winners and nominees
- List of New Zealand musicians
