= The Love Club EP =

- Digital cover (Note: Physical editions feature a smaller picture and the artist's name along the record's title in the upper corners of the image.)

EP by Lorde
- Released: 21 November 2012 (Note: The Love Club EP was self-released as an independent project on 21 November 2012 through Lorde's SoundCloud account.)
- Studios: Golden Age (Auckland, New Zealand)
- Genres: Electronica; electropop
- Length: 16:03
- Labels: Self-released; Universal; Virgin
- Producer: Joel Little

Lorde chronology
The Love Club EP (2012)	Pure Heroine (2013)

Singles from The Love Club EP
- 1. "Royals" Released: 3 June 2013

The Love Club EP is the debut extended play (EP) by New Zealand singer-songwriter Lorde. At the age of 12, she was discovered by Universal Music Group scout Scott MacLachlan, and began writing songs. In December 2011, MacLachlan paired Lorde with producer Joel Little, and within three weeks, the pair had co-written and produced all five songs on the EP. In November 2012, Lorde self-released the EP for free download via SoundCloud. On 8 March 2013 the record was commercially released by Universal Music Group and Virgin Records.

An indie rock-influenced electronica and electropop album, The Love Club EP was well received by music critics, who praised its production and compared its style to works by Sky Ferreira, Florence and the Machine and Lana Del Rey. The release peaked at number two in New Zealand and Australia and was certified platinum and 9 times platinum in those two countries respectively. In the US, the record charted at number 23 on the Billboard 200 chart and has sold 60,000 copies as of August 2013. To promote The Love Club EP, Lorde performed during various concerts, and "Royals" was released as a single.

== Background and production ==
Lorde was discovered by A&R representative Scott MacLachlan of Universal Music Group (UMG) at the age of 12, when MacLachlan saw footage of Lorde performing at a school talent show in Auckland, New Zealand. At the age of 13, Lorde started writing songs herself. MacLachlan unsuccessfully tried to set up Lorde with several songwriters and producers to help her with production. Ultimately, he paired Lorde with Joel Little in December 2011, when she had just turned 15. Little was impressed by Lorde's vocal performance and songwriting abilities, and he built songs with musical structures based on Lorde's lyrics.

The pair recorded songs at Little's Golden Age Studios in Morningside, Auckland. Lorde took inspiration from hip hop-influenced music artists, such as Lana Del Rey, during the writing process, yet criticised their "bullshit" references to "expensive alcohol, beautiful clothes and beautiful cars". Within a week, Lorde had finished recording the tracks "Royals", "Bravado" and "Biting Down" during a school break. The pair also recorded two other songs for the EP: "Million Dollar Bills" and "The Love Club". Lorde wrote the lyrics, while Little composed the melodies and played all the instruments, including drums, guitars and synthesisers. In total, the pair took three weeks to finish The Love Club EP.

== Composition ==
"Biting Down"
A 21-second sample of "Biting Down", a trip hop-influenced drum and bass track

The Love Club EP consists of five songs, written by Lorde (credited to her birth-name Ella Yelich-O'Connor) and Little. The Nelson Mail's Nick Ward described the EP as "indie-flavoured electronica" and detailed Lorde's voice as "smoky", while an editor of AllMusic regarded it as "five evocative, electro-pop meditations on life, love, and the eternal joys and pains of youth, providing a sultry, sinewy soundtrack to summer". Meanwhile, Chris Schulz from The New Zealand Herald said Lorde's voice "seems to come from someone twice her age". Critics compared the EP's musical style to works by Sky Ferreira, Florence and the Machine, and Lana Del Rey. Editor Jim Pinckney from New Zealand Listener opined that Lorde's songs are structured like short stories.

The Love Club EP opens with the chamber pop song "Bravado". Inspired by Kanye West's song "Dark Fantasy", it talks about Lorde's feigned confidence as she prepared to enter the music industry. "Royals" and "Million Dollar Bills" are two tracks that criticise the glamorous lifestyle of the rich; the former combines subgenres of pop, including art pop and electropop, and also incorporates R&B, while the latter is a hybrid of pop and alternative rock with hip hop influences. The title track of the EP, "The Love Club", discusses the befriending of "a bad crowd". The Love Club EP concludes with the trip hop-influenced drum and bass number "Biting Down", featuring "futuristic war drum thump". For the US iTunes Store September 2013 edition of The Love Club EP, "Royals" was replaced by "Swingin Party", a cover version of The Replacements' song.

== Release and promotion ==
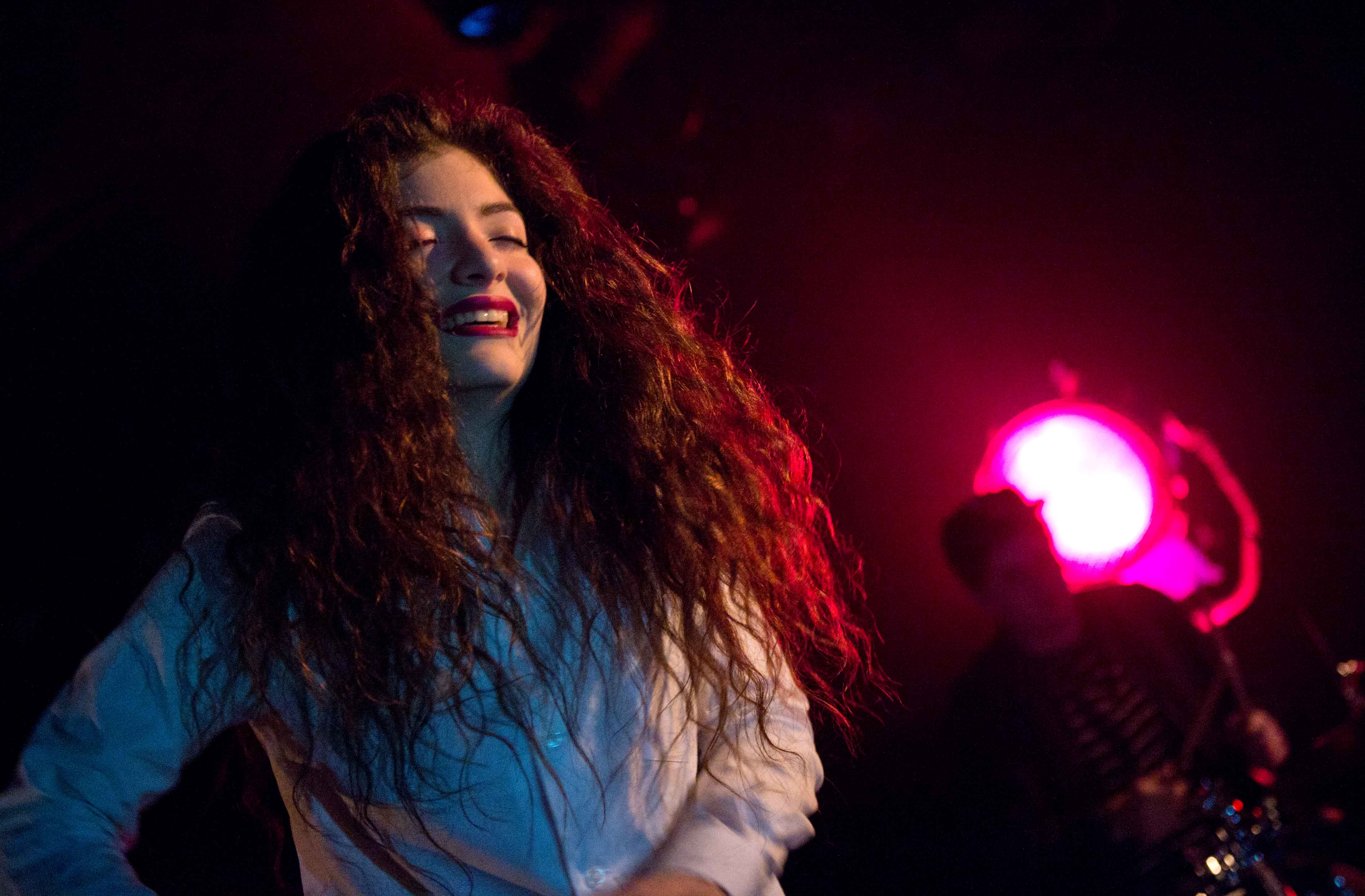
Lorde at the Decibel Festival in 2013

In November 2012, Lorde self-released The Love Club EP through her SoundCloud account for free download. After 60,000 downloads, UMG decided to commercially release the EP. On 8 March 2013, The Love Club EP was released digitally in Australia, New Zealand, the Netherlands, and the United States. The CD edition of the record was released in New Zealand on 10 May, in Australia a week later, and in the United States on 9 July. In the United Kingdom, Virgin Records released a 10-inch vinyl edition on 10 June 2013.

On 30 September 2013, the track listing of the US iTunes Store version of The Love Club EP changed, with "Royals" replaced by "Swingin Party". "Royals" was released as the only single from the EP. On 3 June 2013, Lava and Republic Records sent the track to US adult album alternative (AAA) radio. The single was made available for digital download worldwide in August 2013. All songs from The Love Club EP, including "Royals", were featured on an extended version of Lorde's first studio album Pure Heroine, released in 2013.

On 27 July 2013, Lorde replaced Frank Ocean at the Splendour in the Grass festival in Byron Bay, Australia. On 6 August 2013, she held a concert at Le Poisson Rouge in New York—her first US show. Two days later, she performed "The Love Club" and "Royals" on Santa Monican radio station KCRW. In September 2013, she headlined the Decibel Festival in Seattle, Washington, and held a concert at Webster Hall and Warsaw Venue in New York City to promote The Love Club EP and her debut studio album Pure Heroine. On 13 November 2013, she performed six songs on Live on Letterman, including "Bravado" and "Royals". In early 2014, Lorde embarked on a concert tour in North America to promote The Love Club EP and Pure Heroine.

== Critical reception ==
Professional ratings
Review scores
Source	Rating
AllMusic	3/5 stars
Manawatu Standard	4/5 stars
mX	4/5 stars
The Nelson Mail	5/5 stars
The New Zealand Herald	5/5 stars

An editor of AllMusic called the album "evocative" and praised its "sultry, sinewy" sound. Writing for The New Zealand Herald, Chris Schulz labelled the EP "the start of something very special" and applauded Lorde's vocals. Nick Ward from The Nelson Mail praised the extended play's lyrical content and characterised Lorde as "definitely one to watch". In an article for New Zealand Listener, Jim Pinckney opined that the music "may not yet quite match the individuality of [Lorde's] vocals and lyrics", but praised her songwriting ability, "which combines unmistakably teenage confusion, curiosity and confidence with word skills beyond her years".

On behalf of Manawatu Standard, a reviewer complimented on the EP's production, songwriting and "the right edge to appeal to a mainstream audience", saying the EP was "[what] a good pop debut should be". In a review of The Love Club EP for The Dominion Post, Tom Cardy deemed the songs on the record as "sharp, refreshing and smart". Additionally, he viewed the EP as the best album he had heard by a New Zealand artist that year and lauded Lorde's lyrics and performance as "simply incredible". As a music reviewer for mX, Nick Mason lauded the EP as a "strong" debut release for displaying Lorde's maturity beyond her years, as well as impressive and inventive musical style. By the end of 2013, Allan Raible from ABC News ranked The Love Club EP as well as Pure Heroine as the third best records of the year.

At the 2013 New Zealand Music Awards, Lorde won Breakthrough Artist of the Year for the EP and Single of the Year for "Royals". With "Royals", Lorde and Joel Little won the APRA Silver Scroll award in 2013. At the 56th Annual Grammy Awards (2014), "Royals" was nominated for Record of the Year, and won Song of the Year and Best Pop Solo Performance. The song won Top Rock Song at the 2014 Billboard Music Awards. At the 2014 World Music Awards, the EP was nominated for Best Album, which went to Coup d'Etat by G-Dragon.

== Commercial performance ==
The Love Club EP debuted and peaked on the New Zealand Albums Chart at number two on 18 March 2013. It stayed on the chart for a total of 41 weeks. The EP became the fifth best-selling album of the year in New Zealand was certified platinum by the Recorded Music NZ (RMNZ) for shipping more than 15,000 units in the country. In Australia, the record appeared on the ARIA Singles Chart at number two. The Australian Recording Industry Association (ARIA) certified The Love Club EP 16× platinum in Australia. In the US, the record peaked at number 23 on the Billboard 200 and had sold 60,000 copies by August 2013; it became the 182nd best-selling album of the year in the US.

== Track listing ==
All songs written and composed by Joel Little and Ella Yelich-O'Connor, except "Swingin Party", written by Paul Westerberg.

No.	Title	Length
1.	"Bravado"	3:41
2.	"Royals"	3:10
3.	"Million Dollar Bills"	2:18
4.	"The Love Club"	3:21
5.	"Biting Down"	3:33
Total length:		16:03

iTunes Store bonus track
No.	Title	Length
6.	"Bravado" (Fffrrannno remix)	3:42
Total length:		19:45

US iTunes Store September 2013 edition
No.	Title	Length
1.	"Bravado"	3:41
2.	"Swingin Party"	3:42
3.	"Million Dollar Bills"	2:18
4.	"The Love Club"	3:21
5.	"Biting Down"	3:33
Total length:		16:35

== Charts ==
=== Weekly charts ===
Chart (2013)	Peak; position
Australia (ARIA)	2
Canadian Albums (Billboard)	22
New Zealand Albums (RMNZ)	2
US Billboard 200	23
US Top Rock Albums	6

=== Year-end charts ===
Chart (2013)	Position
Australia (ARIA)	5
New Zealand Albums (RMNZ)	5
US Billboard 200	182

Chart (2014)	Position
Australia (ARIA)	83

=== Decade-end charts ===
Chart (2010–2019)	Position
Australia (ARIA)	29

== Certifications and sales ==
Region	Certification	Certified units/sales
Australia (ARIA)	16× Platinum	1,120,000^{‡}
Canada (Music Canada)	Platinum	80,000^{‡}
New Zealand (RMNZ)	3× Platinum	45,000^{‡}
United States	—	60,000
^{‡} Sales+streaming figures based on certification alone.

== Release history ==
Region	Date	Format	Label(s)	Catalogue no.	Ref.
Australia	8 March 2013	Digital download	Universal	None	
Netherlands	8 March 2013	Digital download	Universal	None	
New Zealand	8 March 2013	Digital download	Universal	None	
United States	8 March 2013	Digital download	Universal	None	
New Zealand	10 May 2013	Compact disc (CD)	Universal	226576	
Australia	17 May 2013	Compact disc (CD)	Universal	3738955	
United Kingdom	10 June 2013	Vinyl	Virgin	3735531	

== See also ==
- List of highest-certified singles in Australia
