= NOS Primavera Sound 2018 =

2018 Festival in Porto, Portugal

The NOS Primavera Sound 2018 was held on 7 to 9 June 2018 at the Parque da Cidade, Porto, Portugal. The festival was headlined by Nick Cave and the Bad Seeds, Lorde, and A$AP Rocky.

== Lineup ==
Headline performers are listed in boldface. Artists listed from latest to earliest set times.

=== NOS ===
Thursday, 7 June	Friday, 8 June	Saturday, 9 June
Jamie xx; **Lorde**; Rhye; Waxahatchee	A$AP Rocky; Vince Staples; The Breeders; Idles	Mogwai; **Nick Cave and the Bad Seeds**; Metá Metá; Belako

NOS headlining set lists
Lorde
1. "Sober"
2. "Homemade Dynamite"
3. "Tennis Court"
4. "Magnets"
5. "Buzzcut Season"
6. "400 Lux"
7. "Ribs"
8. "The Louvre"
9. "Liability"
10. "Sober II (Melodrama)"
11. "Supercut"
12. "Royals"
13. "Perfect Places"
14. "Team"
15. "Green Light"
A$AP Rocky
1. "Distorted Records"
2. "ASAP Forever"
3. "Kids Turned Out Fine"
4. "LSD"
5. "Angels"
6. "Tony Tone"
7. "No Limit"
8. "Praise the Lord (Da Shine)"
9. "Raf"
10. "Fuckin' Problems"
11. "Telephone Calls"
12. "Everyday"
13. "Wild for the Night"
14. "Yamborghini High"
Nick Cave & the Bad Seeds
1. "Jesus Alone"
2. "Magneto"
3. "Do You Love Me?"
4. "From Her to Eternity"
5. "Loverman"
6. "Red Right Hand"
7. "Into My Arms"
8. "Girl in Amber"
9. "Tupelo"
10. "Jubilee Street"
11. "The Weeping Song"
12. "Stagger Lee"
13. "Push the Sky Away"

=== Seat ===
Thursday, 7 June	Friday, 8 June	Saturday, 9 June
Tyler, the Creator; Father John Misty; The Twilight Sad; Fogo Fogo	Fever Ray; Mavi Phoenix; Grizzly Bear; Mattiel; Amen Dunes; Solar Corona	The War on Drugs; Wolf Parade; Public Service Broadcasting; Flat Worms; Rolling Blackouts Coastal Fever; Luís Severo

=== Super Bock ===
Thursday, 7 June	Friday, 8 June	Saturday, 9 June
Moullinex; Ezra Furman; Starcrawler; Foreign Poetry	Four Tet (Live); Shellac; Zeal & Ardor; Black Bombaim	Nils Frahm; Joe Goddard; Kelela; Oso Leone

=== Pitchfork ===
Friday, 8 June	Saturday, 9 June
Floating Points (Solo Live); Unknown Mortal Orchestra; Thundercat; Superorganism; Ibeyi; Yellow Days	Arca; Bad Gyal; Abra; Jay Som; Kelsey Lu; Vagabon; 99Plajo

=== Primavera Bits ===
Thursday, 7 June	Friday, 8 June	Saturday, 9 June
Motor City Drum Ensemble; Gerd Janson; Mall Grab; Tiago	Marcel Dettmann; Levon Vincent; Helena Hauff; Shanti Celeste; DJ Lycox; Liminal Soundbath with Jónsi, Alex Somers and Paul Corley	Talaboman; Avalon Emerson; Denis Sulta; OR:LA; Caroline Lethô; Liminal Soundbath with Jónsi, Alex Somers and Paul Corley

=== Radio Primavera Sound ===
Thursday, 7 June	Friday, 8 June	Saturday, 9 June
DJ Coco	Indiespot DJ	DJ Kitten
