= Writer in the Dark =

2017 song by Lorde

Song by Lorde

from the album Melodrama
- Recorded: January 2017
- Studio: Electric Lady (New York)
- Length: 3:36
- Label: Lava; Republic
- Songwriters: Ella Yelich-O'Connor; Jack Antonoff
- Producers: Lorde; Antonoff

"Writer in the Dark" is a song recorded by New Zealand singer-songwriter Lorde for her second album Melodrama (2017). She co-wrote and co-produced the track with Jack Antonoff. It is a piano ballad with sparse production and an outro. Its lyrics are Lorde's lament to an ex-lover, in which she says she will always love him but she also needs to move her life forwards. The song received acclaim from music critics, many of whom commended its songwriting. Lorde performed "Writer in the Dark" and five other songs as part of a re-imagined Vevo song series at Electric Lady Studios, and was included on the set list of her Melodrama World Tour (2017–2018).

== Background and development ==
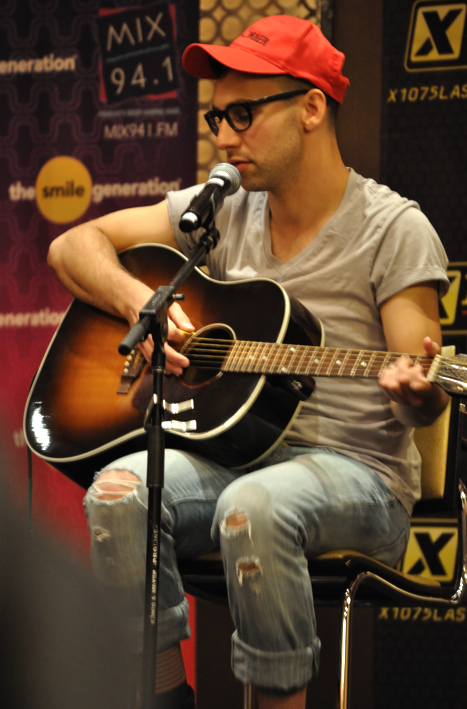
Jack Antonoff co-wrote and co-produced the song.

In an exclusive podcast interview with The Spinoff, Lorde stated that she wrote "Writer in the Dark" from the perspective of "something being finished, but still feeling like I had something I wanted to say". The singer said about the songwriting process, "It's interesting when you're female and you write this confessional, painfully honest music about your life. There's a lot of guilt associated with that." In a separate interview with NME, the singer said she was inspired to write the lyric, "Bet you rue the day you kissed a writer in the dark" after she woke late one night in a bed she was sharing with a stranger.

According to Lorde, the song is her way of saying, "It's what I've always been. It's what I was when you met me. It's what I will continue to be after you leave. That's exactly what was going to happen when you kissed a writer in the dark." She also said the songwriting process felt therapeutic and complex. When asked about writing from a traditionalist perspective, the singer said she felt she made the song unique by implementing words such as "pseudoephedrine", the name of a sympathomimetic drug, which she said would work better in a hip hop song; she enjoyed taking standard forms and putting "spiky bits on them". The singer also compared "Writer in the Dark" and her 2017 song "Liability" to a rap cadence.

== Composition and lyrical interpretation ==
"Writer in the Dark" was co-written and co-produced by Lorde (credited under her birth-name Ella Yelich-O'Connor) and Jack Antonoff. It was recorded at Electric Lady Studios in Greenwich Village, New York City. The song is composed in the key of G major with a walking pace tempo of 72 beats per minute while Lorde's vocals span a range of D_{3} to D_{5}. It is a piano ballad with sparse instrumentation in its production. Its lyrics are Lorde's lament to an ex-lover, whom she tells she will always love but she also needs to move forward. Paste writer Emily Reily said the song "combines Lorde’s defiance with her most desperate and exposed moments."

The song drew comments on Lorde's vocals, which several publications compared to those of English singer Kate Bush. According to Colin Groundwater from Pretty Much Amazing, Lorde vocals on the line "I love you til you call the cops on me" stretch to a "painfully human falsetto", while Chicago Tribune editor Greg Kot said the singer delivers a "resonant line about obsession" as she finds a "way to tunnel out from the wreckage". Drowned in Sound noted a shift in Lorde's vocals from her "usual semi-growl of a delivery to a much more high-pitched warble", while Rolling Stone compared the track to a B-side from Bush's 1985 album Hounds of Love. Entertainment Weekly stated that Lorde acknowledges the "trope of the scorned lover" in the song, while No Ripcord said her vocals turn to grief in the lines, "I am my mother's child, I'll love you 'til my breathing stops".

== Critical reception ==
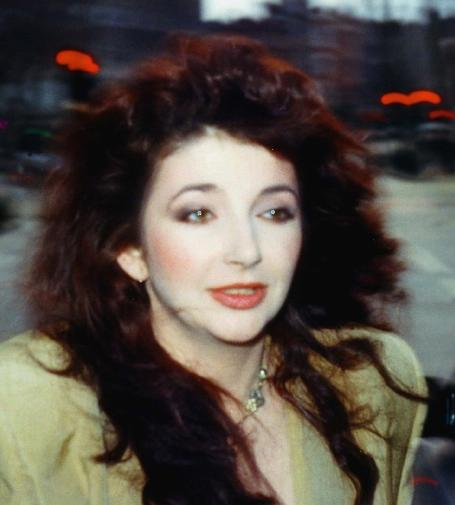
Lorde's vocals on "Writer in the Dark" were compared to those of Kate Bush (pictured in 1986).

"Writer in the Dark" received critical acclaim from music critics; several publications compared its songwriting to the works of American singer-songwriter Taylor Swift. Stuff.co.nz editor Graeme Tuckett called it one of the highlights from the album, saying, "Lorde giving her toughest and least inflected vocal performance in the service of the album's strongest set of lyrics". Alexis Petridis from The Guardian stated that while the song was not the first attempt from a modern female singer to channel Kate Bush, "it may well be the first one that doesn't make you want to die of embarrassment on their behalf".

Sharing similar sentiments, Spencer Kornhaber from The Atlantic called the song a "wonderful nightmare of a piano piece" and concludes by stating that Lorde is saying "something that's been said many times before in song, but she's still saying it more interestingly than most people". DIY writer Will Richards called the song "flooring, showing her to be one of the most emotionally intelligent pop songwriters around", while NME's Dan Stubbs described it as "deliciously bitter". Jon Pareles from The New York Times compared its lyrics to Swift and its aesthetic to American singer Lana Del Rey, saying it is "sometimes sparse and transparent enough to accompany Lorde's voice with just a piano note or two".

"Writer in the Dark" was ranked by Entertainment Weekly 8th on their list of the Most Emotionally Devastating Songs of the 2010s. Eve Barlow, writing for the publication, called it "triumphant".

== Live performances ==
An acapella version "Writer in the Dark" was included in the set list for the Melodrama World Tour. In 2022, video compilations of Lorde shushing her crowd while performing the song went viral on TikTok. Lorde responded by sending a video to a fan site to share, in which she defended the "dramatic ass move", saying that she wanted to "try something different" and that it was "literally from an album called Melodrama".

The track was also played on a number of dates of the Ultrasound World Tour, replacing "Liability".

== Credits and personnel ==
Credits adapted from the liner notes of Melodrama.

Recording and management

- Published by Songs Music Publishing, Sony/ATV Songs, LLC, and Ducky Donath Music (BMI)
- Recorded at Electric Lady Studios (New York City)
- Mixed at Electric Lady Studios
- Mastered at Sterling Sound Studios (New York City)

Personnel

- Lorde – vocals, songwriting, production
- Jack Antonoff – production, songwriting
- Brandon Bost – mixing assistance
- Tom Elmhirst – mixing
- Randy Merrill – mastering
- Barry McCready – engineering assistance
- Seth Paris – engineering assistance
- Greg Eliason – engineering assistance
- Laura Sisk – engineering

== Charts ==
Chart (2017)	Peak position
New Zealand Artist Singles (RMNZ)	7
New Zealand Heatseekers (RMNZ)	2

== Certifications ==
Region	Certification	Certified units/sales
Australia (ARIA)	Gold	35,000^{‡}
Canada (Music Canada)	Gold	40,000^{‡}
New Zealand (RMNZ)	Gold	15,000^{‡}
^{‡} Sales+streaming figures based on certification alone.
