= Hard Feelings/Loveless =

2017 song by Lorde

Song by Lorde

from the album Melodrama
- Studio: Electric Lady (New York); Rough Customer (Brooklyn Heights); Westlake (Los Angeles); Conway (Los Angeles); Jungle City (New York)
- Genre: Electropop
- Length: 6:07
- Label: Lava; Republic
- Songwriters: Ella Yelich-O'Connor; Jack Antonoff
- Producers: Lorde; Antonoff

"Hard Feelings/Loveless" is a medley song recorded by New Zealand singer-songwriter Lorde for her second album, Melodrama (2017). She wrote and co-produced the track with Jack Antonoff, with additional production from Frank Dukes. It draws influences from genres such as industrial music and noise music, and uses a distorted synthesizer. "Loveless" includes two samples: a voice sample taken from a documentary about Paul Simon's 1986 album Graceland, and a drum solo from Phil Collins' 1981 song "In the Air Tonight". The lyrics detail the emotions of falling out of love while mocking the current generation's lengths to pretend to be unaffected by love.

The song received positive reviews from music critics. "Hard Feelings" was praised for its songwriting and experimental production; her vocal delivery, however, was criticised on "Loveless". The lyrics were compared to the 1987 psychological thriller film Fatal Attraction, while its production was likened to Kanye West's work on his 2013 album Yeezus. The track's themes center on the effects of heartbreak and social issues around love. Lorde performed "Hard Feelings/Loveless", with five other songs, as part of a re-imagined Vevo series at the Electric Lady Studios where she recorded most of her album. It was also part of the set list of her Melodrama World Tour (2017–18).

== Background and development ==
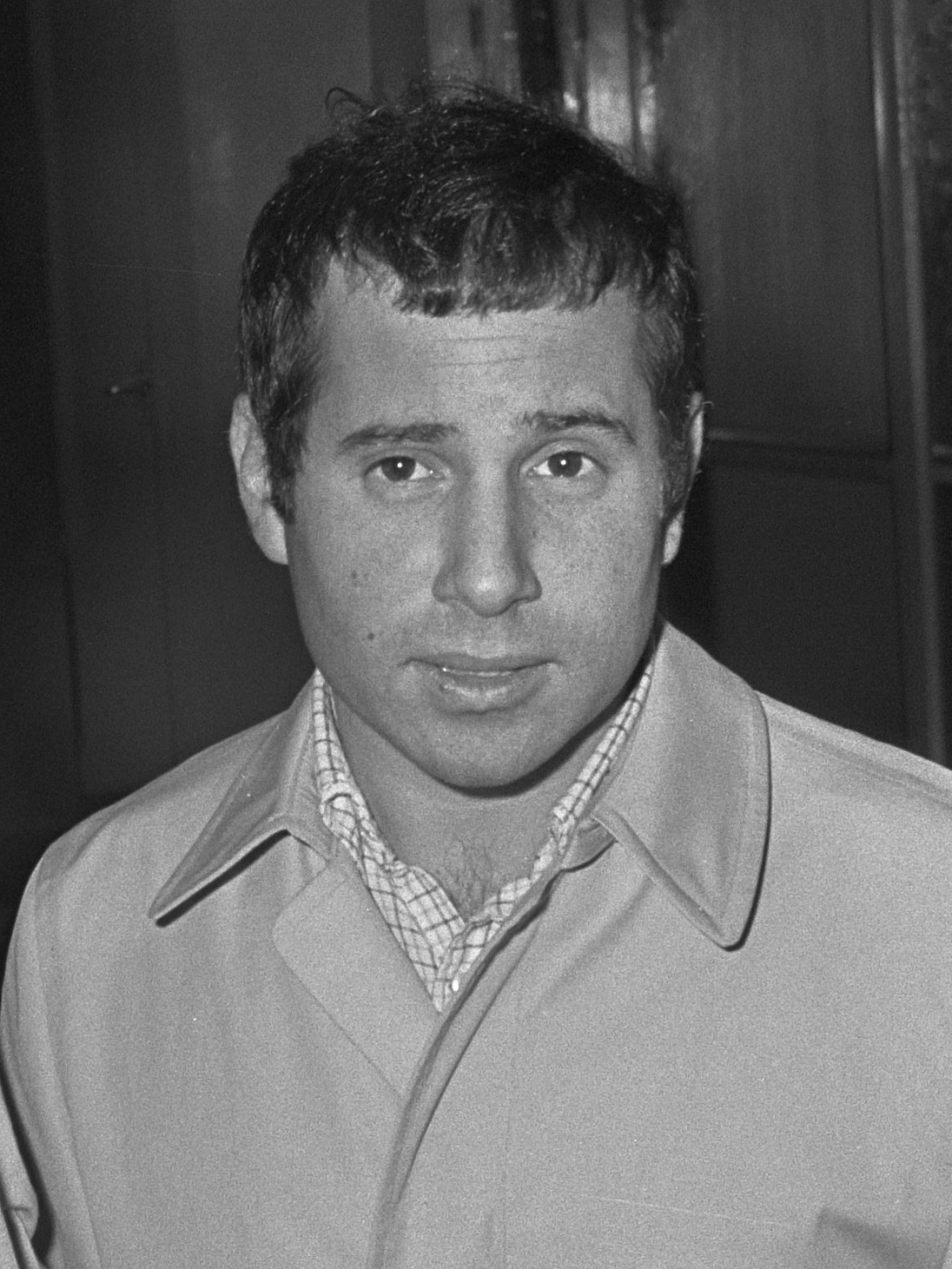
"Loveless" contains a sample from Paul Simon (pictured in 1966) on his documentary about his 1986 album Graceland.

Lorde revealed in an interview with The Spinoff that the first two lines from "Loveless", "What is this tape? / This is my favorite tape" were sampled from a documentary she watched about Paul Simon's 1986 album Graceland. The drum solo, used as the transition instrument for "Loveless", was sampled from Phil Collins' 1981 song "In the Air Tonight". Lorde stated that this was one of the earliest tracks on the record. She often listened to the soft rock music of Leonard Cohen, Joni Mitchell, Fleetwood Mac and Simon while riding the subways in New York City, or on cab rides after attending parties in her hometown of Auckland. They were sources of inspiration for "Hard Feelings/Loveless".

Despite not being credited for production, Lorde said that Malay brought in some guitars which they used for "Hard Feelings". In a New York Times profile, Jack Antonoff called the song the "calm after a big fight". He also said that "Hard Feelings/Loveless" reminded him of Don Henley's 1989 song "The Heart of the Matter", which "grapples with news that a past lover has met someone new, then laments other bygone relationships". Lorde recalled that she felt similar emotions, saying that the "moment you get out of the car, you are only going to get farther apart from each other". Antonoff stated in an interview with Entertainment Weekly that one of his proudest moments during the recording was placing a "synth at the end [of the song] that sounds like metal bending". During recording sessions, Antonoff recommended that Lorde take inspiration from Irish singer Sinéad O'Connor's voice. They also experimented with the enunciation of the phrase "hard feelings".

== Recording and lyrics ==
"Hard Feelings"
A sample of "Hard Feelings", a song with influences of other genres such industrial, and noise, as well as the use of a distorted synthesizer in its production.

"Loveless"
A sample of "Loveless", a song that uses the drum solo from Phil Collins' 1981 song "In the Air Tonight" as well as Paul Simon's vocals from a documentary about his 1986 album Graceland.

Lorde recorded "Hard Feelings/Loveless" at five different locations in the United States. She began recording at Conway Recording Studios, in Los Angeles, California, assisted by recording engineer Eric Eylands. She also recorded at Rough Customer Studios, in Brooklyn Heights, New York, with Barry McCready and Jack Antonoff. Recording also took place at Electric Lady Studios and at Jungle City Studios. It was completed at Westlake Recording Studios, in Los Angeles, with Greg Eliason. John Hanes mixed "Hard Feelings" at MixStar Studios, while Antonoff mixed "Loveless" at his home studio of Rough Customer Studios. Other personnel include Frank Dukes, who provided additional production to the song.

"Hard Feelings/Loveless" is composed in the key of B major with a moderate groove tempo of 74 beats per minute. Lorde's vocals span a range of E_{3} to G#_{4}. The song has two different chord progressions, "Hard Feelings" follows a basic sequence of B–E–G♯m–E while "Loveless" follows a sequence of E–C♯m–A–B–E. "Hard Feelings/Loveless" is an "industrial-infused" song which has influences of other genres such as noise music, as well as the use of a distorted synthesizer in its production.

Critics interpreted "Hard Feelings" as a song about the emotions of falling out of love, while "Loveless" discusses the "generational epidemic of love". Stacey Anderson from Pitchfork described the song as having a "creaky, atonal electronic rasp". Jon Pareles of The New York Times described the production of "Hard Feelings/Loveless" as infusing some "mixes with noise," making "burbles and blotches of synthesizer distortion erupt on the edges" of the first song like the "psychic storm behind the song's attempts at a merciful breakup". Spencer Kornhaber from The Atlantic felt that the song's lyrics painted a "touching scene of her sitting in a car with a beau on the verge of splitting" ending the track with "I guess I should go."

== Reception and promotion ==
"Hard Feelings/Loveless" received positive reviews from music critics, many of whom praised its lyrics and experimental production. Entertainment Weekly writer Nolan Feeney said that Lorde showed a "winking self-awareness, taking the cliché of the crazy ex-girlfriend" to extremes. Her persona was compared to Alex Forrest in the 1987 psychological thriller film Fatal Attraction. The Jakarta Post writer Stanley Widianto felt that "Hard Feelings" had "Melodrama's most challenging moments". Pigeons and Planes and Vulture placed it in their Best Songs of the Week lists. Pretty Much Amazing called "Hard Feelings/Loveless" one of the "most ambitious pop songs" of the year, comparing its sound to West's work on his 2013 album Yeezus. Slant called the first part of the song a "happy surprise," referring it as the "most shamelessly poppy track" she ever recorded.

In a mixed-positive review, The Spinoff noted that while the contrast between both tracks was "obviously intentional," it made an "ambiguous artistic statement" that the album did not pull off. Sharing similar sentiments, Spin writer, Anna Gaca commented that the track was "ragged" and a "two-faced puzzle that creaks through its experimental instrumental". Gaca further stated that the album's "weirder moments glint like diamonds in the rough," and that there was something to love in every song, "even the misfortunate Loveless". Lorde performed "Hard Feelings/Loveless", with five other songs, as part of a re-imagined Vevo series at the Electric Lady Studios where she recorded most of the album. It was also part of the set list of her Melodrama World Tour (2017–2018). "Hard Feelings" was the third song Lorde played at her Manchester, United Kingdom date, while "Loveless" was the encore. "Hard Feelings" was absent from the Ultrasound World Tour setlist until its tour debut as an impromptu surprise encore before the closer, Ribs, on the B‐Stage on the 29th of November at the Bologna stop of the tour. However it was a regular feature of the reduced setlist of the tour's festival leg in the summer of 2026.

== Credits and personnel ==
Credits adapted from the liner notes of Melodrama.

Recording

- Recorded at Conway Recording Studios (Los Angeles, California), Electric Lady Studios (Greenwich Village, New York), Jungle City Studios (Chelsea, Manhattan), Rough Customer Studios (Brooklyn Heights, New York) and Westlake Recording Studios (Los Angeles)
- "Hard Feelings" mixed at MixStar Studios (Virginia Beach, Virginia) / "Loveless" mixed at Rough Customer Studios
- Mastered at Sterling Sound Studios (New York)

Management

- Published by Songs Music Publishing, Sony/ATV Songs LLC, and Ducky Donath Music (BMI)
- Paul Simon appears courtesy of the documentary film, Under African Skies: Paul Simon's Graceland Journey, produced by RadicalMedia/Indie Age Films

Personnel

- Lorde – songwriter, vocals, producer
- Jack Antonoff – songwriter, producer, mixing ("Loveless")
- Frank Dukes – additional production ("Loveless")
- Laura Sisk – engineer
- Greg Eliason – assistant engineering
- Eric Eylands – assistant engineering
- Barry McCready – assistant engineering
- Brendan Morawski – assistant engineering
- Serban Ghebea – mixing ("Hard Feelings")
- John Hanes – mixing engineer
- Randy Merrill – mastering

== Certifications ==
Region	Certification	Certified units/sales
Australia (ARIA)	Gold	35,000^{‡}
Canada (Music Canada)	Gold	40,000^{‡}
New Zealand (RMNZ)	Gold	15,000^{‡}
^{‡} Sales+streaming figures based on certification alone.
