= Melodrama World Tour =

2017–18 concert tour by Lorde

- Tour by Lorde
- Associated album: Melodrama
- Start date: 26 September 2017
- End date: 17 November 2018
- Legs: 4
- No. of shows: 23 in Europe; 14 in Oceania; 33 in North America; 2 in Asia; 4 in South America; 76 in total

Lorde concert chronology
- Pure Heroine Tour (2013–14); Melodrama World Tour (2017–18); Solar Power Tour (2022–23)

The Melodrama World Tour was the second concert tour by New Zealand singer-songwriter Lorde, undertaken in support of her second studio album, Melodrama (2017). Lorde headlined several music festivals before commencing the tour, and went on to communicate frequently with stage designer Es Devlin to plan the show's design. European shows began in September 2017, followed by dates in Oceania and a solo trek through North America. Dates in other European cities soon followed along with various festival performances.

The show consisted of three segments and two costume changes. The first featured Lorde in a dark outfit, while during the second segment she wore a lighter costume. The set list consisted of songs from her debut and second studio albums. She also performed one of several cover versions of songs at each show and premiered an unreleased song titled "Precious Metals". An alternate set list with several video interludes was performed during the first European leg of her tour. The show received critical acclaim, with critics complimenting her stage design and her presence.

== Background and development ==
Lorde announced dates for the Europe and Oceania legs of her tour via Twitter on 8 June 2017. Her tweet was accompanied by the release of a new song titled "Sober" (2017) and the announcement of the opening act for her tour, Khalid. The following week, a North American leg was announced. Lorde revealed her opening acts would be Mitski, Tove Styrke, and Run the Jewels on 4 October 2017. Shortly after the 60th Annual Grammy Awards, Lorde tweeted, "If you're debating whether or not I can murder a stage ... come see it for [yourself]" after it was reported that she was the only Album of the Year nominee not to be offered a solo performance at the ceremony.

Prior to starting her tour, Lorde made several festival appearances as a headliner to promote her album Melodrama. She appeared at Glastonbury in the United Kingdom, where her set was widely praised by critics. A month later, she performed at Osheaga in Montreal, with Tove Lo serving as a special guest, performing a duet of "Homemade Dynamite" with Lorde. She also headlined Lollapalooza in Chicago; however, her set was cut short due to inclement weather. Lorde made other appearances including at Roskilde in Denmark, Fuji Rock in Japan, Bumbershoot in Seattle, and Life is Beautiful in Nevada.

=== Equipment ===
A transparent container (pictured) was employed for the duration of the tour. When raised and unoccupied it tilted up to 30 degrees — 10 degrees when occupied.

After performing "Green Light" and "Liability" on the 11 March 2017 episode of Saturday Night Live, Lorde met with stage designer Es Devlin to outline a set design for her tour. The pair communicated frequently during the recording sessions for Melodrama. For her Coachella set they collaborated with Tait Towers, a live event engineering firm, to create a 20 ft (6 m)-long "see-through container"; after a successful show, she opted to employ the container for her tour.

Several modifications were made to the container to suit the size of each dancer who would occupy the vessel. Four hoists, four hatch doors and a rope ladder were added although its size was not altered. The container could support seven performers and tilt at a 10 degree angle when occupied; unoccupied, it could tilt at a 30 degree angle. Richard Young, the tour's production director, said the purpose of the container was to mirror the album's storyline, saying:

We reveal the tank a third of the way in; it goes up and down and dancers get into it. At the end, the dancers ride the tank into the grid, and the party floats away. [Lorde] walks away, leaving the party going on behind her.

Shannon Nickerson, Tait Towers' project manager, considered two factors for the container's design: its ability to be disassembled and shipped with "minimal square footage" and to provide movement around the stage. The container measured 21 ft (6 m) wide, 7 ft (2 m) deep, and 8 ft (2 m) high with a maximum trim height of 48 ft (15 m). It was sealed underneath a slip stage, allowing the container to ascend from downstage when the slip opens. Lorde collaborated with lighting designer Martin Phillips on stage lighting. They created an outline of the container with 16 Martin by Harman VDO Sceptrons. The interior featured eight Solaris Flare Q+ units while its exterior was illuminated with four Robe Robin BMFL Blades. Philips and Lorde also worked on the tour's color palette. Due to her synesthesia, she provided him with "broad color palettes" for each song to mirror her feelings associated with them.

=== Sound technology ===
In 2017, Lorde's production team collaborated with Firehouse Productions and L-Acoustics on a technical partnership. According to Scott Sugden, head of applications for L-Acoustics, Lorde utilized the "frontal" system, where the public address system is located on the stage forefront. Her set also used "five arrays directly above the stage", four extension arrays, nine speakers as well as 16 KS-28 subwoofers. Upstaging, Inc. distributed lighting and video supplies and operated as a rigging vendor for the tour. Chris Russo, director of touring for Firehouse, commented that rigging the stage was a challenge, saying:

The Lorde tour was more of everything. Usually, you hang a left/right P.A. plus the sides, you get your angles and lasers sighted-in on four hangs, and you're done. With 360, you add two more. With this show, those guys are sighting-in 11 hangs, and that's not even including the (flown) subs — and that's at least two-and-a-half times as many motors as in a typical rock show.

Philip Harvey, a mixing engineer, utilized the Solid State Logic L500 Plus keypad that detects each instrument and displays it as small circle on the "L-ISA Controller screen" with a map locating each speaker. Harvey operated at a range of 102-107db. The L-ISA Processor stabilized sound variances; Sugden compared its sound to watching a jazz performer in a cabaret show. For Lorde's vocal layering and texture, Harvey used two reverberation systems, a MultiRack: the Waves Abbey Road Reverb Plates and IR-Live Convolution Reverb, with the latter using the "Sydney Opera House impulse response" to create a deeper and augmented effect.

== Concert synopsis ==
During the performance of "The Louvre", Lorde was carried horizontally by four of her tour dancers. Critics compared it to a "sacrifice ritual".

The show was divided into three segments and an encore. The main show began with a dark stage for "Sober". Six dancers were onstage in different poses as lights faded in and out; they moved downstage as Lorde began to sing. She was concealed from the audience until the second verse when a pair of lights revealed her. After concluding "Homemade Dynamite", she greeted the crowd with, "Hello and welcome to the Melodrama World Tour!". During "Tennis Court", one dancer stood on top of a transparent container box, facing the audience with a spotlight shining on her. The next song, "Magnets", was performed with three dancers behind Lorde; three spotlights illuminated the stage in pink and purple colours. A video played in the background showing four women in a car sharing a flask and smoking a joint as they apply their makeup. The song ended with Lorde performing a synchronized dance routine with her dancers.

Two female dancers mimed each other's actions during "Buzzcut Season". Lorde opened the left door of the container and walked inside as the lights shifted from yellow to pink and left momentarily. She introduced "400 Lux" saying, "This is for the kids from the suburbs." A video played in the background showing a woman resting her head near a car window as it drives through city streets at night. During "Ribs", all six dancers returned to perform while a blue and green video played. Lorde stepped inside the container as an interlude played towards the end of the song. A dim blue spotlight shone on her and then faded as she changed into a bright-coloured outfit. During "The Louvre", two dancers performed an interpretative dance to the song. A video played showing monarch butterflies pollinating flowers, a woman graciously falling into a pool and two lovers kissing. During the song's outro, all six dancers lifted Lorde horizontally as she concluded the song. Each dancer mimed one another's movements during "Hard Feelings". One dancer remained inside the container as it ascended.

During the encore, Lorde uses a MPD24 MIDI controller (pictured) to play "Loveless" and "Precious Metals".

The dancer from the previous song remained in the container during "Yellow Flicker Beat". A video of Lorde spray-painting a car in an abandoned parking lot played in the background; the container tilted sideways several times during the performance. After completing the song, she spoke to the crowd about the previous year of her life; her dancers placed fluorescent light tubes around the stage before she sang "Writer in the Dark". She sang a cover of Frank Ocean's 2016 song "Solo" in an identical setting. Lorde introduced "Liability" saying, "This is another song about being alone". During "Sober II (Melodrama)", the container ascended and tilted sideways to show all the dancers reenacting a fight in slow motion lit with red and violet hues. As the outro played, Lorde left the stage to change her outfit. Quotes from American journalist Joan Didion's 1968 essay collection book Slouching Towards Bethlehem were shown on a screen during an interlude.

Lorde was shown in silhouette form inside the container with a male dancer as the song "Supercut" played. The container was illuminated in purple and pink hues. She laid down in the opposite direction of the dancer during the outro. During "Royals", the box pulsated white flashing lights. Lorde performed "Perfect Places" by herself as a video of a burning house played in the background. During "Green Light", two green and blue spotlights shone on her during the start of the performance while green lights strobed before the chorus. Rope ladders descended from the container for each dancer to use. The song slowed before the final chorus began as Lorde told the crowd, "I need you to dance. I need you to sing. I need you to give me everything. Can you do that?". Star-shaped confetti shot out into the audience. For the encore, Lorde used a drum pad (MPD24 MIDI controller) for "Loveless"; she also performed an unreleased song titled "Precious Metals". During the last song "Team", Lorde stepped outside the stage to sing an extended verse of the song while greeting fans. She concluded her performance by taking a bow and leaving the stage.

== Reception ==
=== Critical response ===
The Melodrama World Tour received critical acclaim. Jon Caramanica of The New York Times praised her stage presence, saying: "She smiles and sighs as easily as she loses herself in reverie when the song demands it". Caramanica also noted how the "most striking moments were the most bare". Echoing similar thoughts, Jim Harrington of The Mercury News lauded Lorde for her personality, saying she "dominated our attention and fascination during each and every moment of the concert". Los Angeles Times' writer Mikael Wood complimented Lorde for being able to create a "sense of intimacy" in such an "expansive space". The Independent's Daniel Wright gave the London show a four out of five star rating, complimenting her self-aware attitude but felt her cover of Phil Collins' 1981 song "In the Air Tonight" was "out of place".

Greg Kot of the Chicago Tribune called her show "stark, personal, a little weird — and more engaging and relatable because of it". Uproxx writer Philip Cosores praised Lorde's versatility as a performer on stage and called her music and spirit "vital", while Preston Jones of the Dallas Observer praised her for delivering a "polished, confident and emotionally charged set". Exclaim! writer Anna Elger awarded the Vancouver show an eight out of ten, calling it an "ambitious and confidently executed production that showed the New Zealand pop star embracing performing on the biggest stages of her career thus far". Ed Masley of The Arizona Republic described the Glendale show as an "artful blend of modern dance, performance art and classical ballet". The Seattle Times writer Michael Rietmulder said that while the start of the show was "lukewarm", it progressed as the set continued. Stereogum's Chris DeVille was critical of her "basic arena banter" but said that "she's her own kind of pop star, one with a different skill set and point of view than we’ve come to expect from people with this job".

=== Accolades ===
==== Year-end lists ====
Publication	Rank	Ref.
Billboard	—N/a	
The Chicago Tribune	6	
Columbus Alive	—N/a	
The Mercury News	1	
Milwaukee Journal Sentinel	4	
St. Louis Post-Dispatch	—N/a (Note: The Chaifenz Arena tour date was listed as an honorable mention.)	
Tampa Bay Times	—N/a	

==== All-time lists ====
Publication	Rank	Ref.
The Guardian	—N/a	

==== Awards ====
Year	Ceremony	Award	Result	Ref.
2017	NME Awards	Best Live Artist	Nominated	
2018	Q Awards	Best Live Artist	Nominated	

=== Commercial performance ===
Several sources reported below-average tour sales. The Guardian reported that an estimated 6,000 concertgoers attended the Milwaukee tour date. Ticketmaster offered a discount code, reducing the price of premium seats from $99 (NZ$137) to $39 (NZ$53). However, it was reported that New Zealand tour dates sold out in minutes, with half of those tickets sold during pre-sales. Anschutz Entertainment Group, a promoter for the tour, also offered free upgrades to lower seats and closed off venue's upper tiers. Pollstar placed Lorde at number 21 on their Global Concert Pulse list with an average gross of $477,931 and 7,191 average ticket sales based on data taken from 11 cities. The average ticket price was $66.45. At the end of 2018, Lorde ranked number 122 on the site's Top 200 North American Tours with an average gross of $509,357, 7,803 in average ticket sales and an average ticket price of $65.28. It was reported that tour dates in the United Kingdom, Australia (Perth and Sydney) as well as US locations in Washington, D.C., and Brooklyn were sold out.

== Opening acts ==
- George Maple (Australia)
- Milk & Bone (Canada)
- Khalid (Europe)
- Yumi Zouma (New Zealand)
- Tapz (New Zealand)
- David Dallas (New Zealand)
- Drax Project (New Zealand)
- Matthew Young (New Zealand)
- French for Rabbits (New Zealand)
- Mermaidens (New Zealand)
- Run the Jewels (North America)
- Mitski (North America)
- Tove Styrke (North America)
- Anna of the North (Scotland)
- Malbec (Russia)
- Suzanne (Russia)
- Liza Gromova (Russia)
- Cats Park (Russia)

== Set list ==
This set list is from the show on March 1, 2018, in Milwaukee. It does not represent all concerts for the duration of the tour. Lorde changed the covers as the tour progressed.

1. "Sober"
2. "Homemade Dynamite"
3. "Tennis Court"
4. "Magnets"
5. "Buzzcut Season”
6. "400 Lux"
7. "Ribs"
8. "The Louvre"
9. "Hard Feelings"
10. "Yellow Flicker Beat"
11. "Writer in the Dark"
12. "Solo" (Frank Ocean cover)
13. "Liability"
14. "Sober II (Melodrama)"
15. "Supercut"
16. "Royals"
17. "Perfect Places"
18. "Green Light"

Encore

19. "Loveless"
20. "Precious Metals" (unreleased song)
21. "Team"

=== Notes ===
- Lorde performed a cover of The 1975's "Somebody Else" during the European leg.
- During the Australian leg and select shows in the United States, Lorde performed a cover of Powderfinger's "My Happiness".
- Lorde performed a cover of Bruce Springsteen's "I'm on Fire" on the Australian leg and select United States dates.
- During the show in Sydney, Lorde sang a chorus from Whitney Houston's "I Wanna Dance with Somebody (Who Loves Me)" and a cover of "Throw Your Arms Around Me" by Hunters & Collectors.
- Lorde performed a cover of "In the Air Tonight" by Phil Collins at the Manchester show.
- During the show in Chicago, Lorde performed a cover of Kanye West's "Love Lockdown" and interpolated the chorus from "Runaway" during "Liability".
- Lorde performed a cover of Drake's song "Shot for Me" at the Toronto show.
- During the show in Minneapolis, Lorde performed a cover of Prince's "I Would Die 4 U".

=== Special guests ===
- March 23, 2018 – Saint Paul: "Hang with Me" (Robyn cover) with Tove Styrke
- April 4, 2018 – Brooklyn: "New York" (St. Vincent cover) with Jack Antonoff

== Controversies ==
=== Israel controversy ===
In December 2017, Lorde cancelled her scheduled June concert in Israel following an online campaign by Palestinian solidarity activists supporting the Boycott, Divestment and Sanctions campaign. The online campaign included an open letter published on The Spinoff New Zealand online magazine by a Jewish New Zealander activist and a Palestinian New Zealander activist. It urged Lorde to cancel her Israel tour, saying that the "Israeli government's policies of oppression, ethnic cleansing, human rights violations, occupation and apartheid". Lorde issued a statement on Twitter thanking her fans for educating her about the Israeli–Palestinian conflict saying, "I'm not too proud to admit I didn't make the right call [by booking this tour]".

Boycott activists and supporters including the Palestinian Campaign for the Academic and Cultural Boycott of Israel welcomed Lorde's cancellation of her Israeli tour. In contrast, pro-Israel groups and supporters including the actress Roseanne Barr criticised Lorde's action. Israeli Culture and Sports Minister Miri Regev and the Israeli Ambassador to New Zealand Itzhak Gerbeg also issued statements urging Lorde to reconsider her cancellation; Gerbeg invited Lorde to meet with him.

American Orthodox Rabbi and author Shmuley Boteach's organization "The World Values Network" placed a full-page advertisement in the Washington Post, with the headline "Lorde and New Zealand ignore Syria to attack Israel", and called her a "bigot", saying that there was what they called a double standard in that she would at the same time be touring Russia, despite Putin's support for the Syrian regime and its killings in Syria. The criticism was one of several angry denunciations from well-known Israelis and Jewish leaders of her cancellation, and the Zionist Federation of New Zealand and the Jewish Council of New Zealand were also critical of her, though the ad itself was met with a distancing by the Jewish Council. In response to Boteach's poster, one hundred actors, writers, directors, and musicians including Roger Waters, John Cusack, Angela Davis, Mark Ruffalo, and Viggo Mortensen published a joint letter in The Guardian defending Lorde's stand. On 31 January 2018, three Israeli teenagers sued the activists who wrote the open letter for "emotional damage" resulting from the concert's cancellation. An Israeli court ruled the two activists had to pay $18,000 in damages, however the judgement was not automatically enforceable under New Zealand law. The activists responded to the ruling by saying they had no intention to pay the fine, instead opening a crowdfunding campaign to support the Gaza Mental Health Foundation.

Lorde was scheduled to perform in Miami and Tampa Bay in April 2018. Based on anti-Boycott, Divestment and Sanctions legislation in Florida which bars companies that receive state funds from doing business over $1 million with organizations associated with the campaign, Member of the Florida House of Representatives Randy Fine called for the cancellation of Lorde's April 2018 concerts in Florida saying that Lorde's cancellation in Israel made her subject to the law and as such she shouldn't be able to perform. Lorde performed as scheduled.

=== Stage design controversy ===
On 12 November 2018, Lorde uploaded several Instagram Stories comparing the stage design used on her tour to Kanye West and Kid Cudi's Kids See Ghosts show at the Camp Flog Gnaw festival. On the last upload, she wrote: "I'm proud of the work I do and it's flattering when other artists are inspired by it, to the extent that they choose to try it on for themselves. But don't steal — not from women or anyone else — not in 2018 or ever". John McGuire, owner of Trask House, the company that designed West's stage, sent an email to The New York Times stating that Lorde was not the first artist to implement the idea, saying, "Cubes and floating aren't new to Kanye West, stage design or architecture. A quick google of floating glass box brings up many instances of suspended glass cubes". Devlin, Lorde's stage designer said that the container's design was "not in any way new and the geometry precedes all of us". She later posted an image of a similar design she made for the English National Opera’s rendition of Carmen in 2007.

== Shows ==
List of concerts, showing date, city, country, and venue
Date	City	Country	Venue
Europe
26 September 2017	Manchester	United Kingdom	O_{2} Apollo Manchester
27 September 2017	London	United Kingdom	Alexandra Palace
30 September 2017	Brighton	United Kingdom	Brighton Centre
1 October 2017	Birmingham	United Kingdom	O_{2} Academy Birmingham
2 October 2017	Glasgow	United Kingdom	O_{2} Academy Glasgow
4 October 2017	Tilburg	Netherlands	Main Stage at 013
5 October 2017	Paris	France	Zénith Paris
6 October 2017	Antwerp	Belgium	Lotto Arena
8 October 2017	Lyon	France	Le Transbordeur
9 October 2017	Barcelona	Spain	Sant Jordi Club
11 October 2017	Munich	Germany	Zenith
12 October 2017	Milan	Italy	Fabrique
14 October 2017	Cologne	Germany	Palladium
15 October 2017	Berlin	Germany	Tempodrom
17 October 2017	Stockholm	Sweden	Annexet
18 October 2017	Oslo	Norway	Sentrum Scene
19 October 2017 (Note: The concert of 18 October 2017 at the Høyskoledalen in Trondheim was part of the UKA.)	Trondheim	Norway	Høyskoledalen
North America
21 October 2017 (Note: The concert of 21 October 2017 at the Hollywood Bowl in Hollywood was part of the We Can Survive Festival.)	Los Angeles	United States	Hollywood Bowl
Oceania
7 November 2017	Dunedin	New Zealand	Dunedin Town Hall
8 November 2017	Christchurch	New Zealand	Isaac Theatre Royal
9 November 2017	Christchurch	New Zealand	Isaac Theatre Royal
11 November 2017	Wellington	New Zealand	Michael Fowler Centre
12 November 2017	Auckland	New Zealand	Bruce Mason Centre
14 November 2017	Auckland	New Zealand	Powerstation
15 November 2017	Auckland	New Zealand	Powerstation
18 November 2017	Perth	Australia	Pioneer Women's Memorial
21 November 2017	Sydney	Australia	Sydney Opera House Forecourt
22 November 2017	Sydney	Australia	Sydney Opera House Forecourt
23 November 2017	Brisbane	Australia	Riverstage
25 November 2017 (Note: The concert of 25 November 2017 at the Commonwealth Park in Canberra was part of the Spilt Milk Festival.)	Canberra	Australia	Commonwealth Park
26 November 2017	Melbourne	Australia	Sidney Myer Music Bowl
North America
1 March 2018	Milwaukee	United States	BMO Harris Bradley Center
2 March 2018	St. Louis	United States	Chaifetz Arena
3 March 2018	Kansas City	United States	Sprint Center
5 March 2018	Denver	United States	Pepsi Center
8 March 2018	Vancouver	Canada	Rogers Arena
9 March 2018	Seattle	United States	KeyArena
10 March 2018	Portland	United States	Moda Center
12 March 2018	Sacramento	United States	Golden 1 Center
13 March 2018	Oakland	United States	Oracle Arena
14 March 2018	Los Angeles	United States	Staples Center
16 March 2018	Glendale	United States	Gila River Arena
18 March 2018	Dallas	United States	American Airlines Center
19 March 2018	Houston	United States	Toyota Center
21 March 2018	Tulsa	United States	BOK Center
23 March 2018	Saint Paul	United States	Xcel Energy Center
24 March 2018	Lincoln	United States	Pinnacle Bank Arena
25 March 2018	Des Moines	United States	Wells Fargo Arena
27 March 2018	Rosemont	United States	Allstate Arena
28 March 2018	Detroit	United States	Little Caesars Arena
29 March 2018	Toronto	Canada	Air Canada Centre
31 March 2018	Columbus	United States	Schottenstein Center
2 April 2018	Philadelphia	United States	Wells Fargo Center
3 April 2018	Boston	United States	TD Garden
4 April 2018	New York City	United States	Barclays Center
6 April 2018	Newark	United States	Prudential Center
7 April 2018	Uncasville	United States	Mohegan Sun Arena
8 April 2018	Washington, D.C.	United States	The Anthem
11 April 2018	Tampa	United States	Amalie Arena
12 April 2018	Miami	United States	American Airlines Arena
14 April 2018	Duluth	United States	Infinite Energy Arena
15 April 2018	Nashville	United States	Bridgestone Arena
Europe
26 May 2018 (Note: The concert of 26 May 2018 in London was part of the All Points East Festival.)	London	United Kingdom	Victoria Park
29 May 2018	Saint Petersburg	Russia	Ice Palace
31 May 2018	Moscow	Russia	Crocus City Hall
2 June 2018 (Note: The concert of 2 June 2018 in Barcelona was part of Primavera Sound.)	Barcelona	Spain	Parc del Fòrum
7 June 2018 (Note: The concert of 7 May 2018 in Porto was part of NOS Primavera Sound.)	Porto	Portugal	Parque da Cidade
9 June 2018 (Note: The concert of 9 June 2018 in Manchester was part of Parklife.)	Manchester	United Kingdom	Heaton Park
North America
13 July 2018 (Note: The concert of 13 July 2018 in Quebec City was part of the Quebec City Summer Festival.)	Quebec City	Canada	Plains of Abraham
Oceania
20 July 2018 (Note: The concert of 20 July 2018 in Byron Bay was part of Splendour in the Grass.)	Byron Bay	Australia	North Byron Parklands
Asia
21 July 2018 (Note: The concert of 21 July 2018 at the JIExpo Kemayoran in Jakarta was part of the We the Fest.)	Jakarta	Indonesia	JIExpo Kemayoran
22 July 2018 (Note: The concert of 22 July 2018 in Kuala Lumpur was part of Good Vibes Festival.)	Kuala Lumpur	Malaysia	The Ranch at Gohtong Jaya
Latin America
10 November 2018 (Note: The concert of 10 November 2018 in Santiago was part of Festival Fauna Primavera.)	Santiago	Chile	Espacio Broadway
11 November 2018 (Note: The concert of 11 November 2018 in Buenos Aires was part of Personal Fest.)	Buenos Aires	Argentina	Club Ciudad
15 November 2018 (Note: The concert of 15 November 2018 at the Latin America Memorial in São Paulo was part of the Popload Festival.)	São Paulo	Brazil	Latin America Memorial
17 November 2018 (Note: The concert of 17 November 2018 in Mexico City was part of Corona Capital.)	Mexico City	Mexico	Autódromo Hermanos Rodríguez

=== Cancelled shows ===
List of cancelled concerts, showing date, city, country, venue and reason for cancellation
Date	City	Country	Venue	Reason
5 June 2018	Tel Aviv	Israel	Tel Aviv Convention Center	Standing with Palestinian cause

=== Revenue ===
Venue	City	Tickets sold / available	Gross revenue
O_{2} Apollo Manchester	Manchester	3,500 / 3,500 (100%)	$152,741
Alexandra Palace	London	10,250 / 10,250 (100%)	$446,522
Brighton Centre	Brighton	4,450 / 4,450 (100%)	$196,768
O_{2} Academy Birmingham	Birmingham	3,009 / 3,009 (100%)	$133,051
Zénith Paris	Paris	6,293 / 6,293 (100%)	$375,527
Lotto Arena	Antwerp	8,032 / 8,050 (99%)	$402,990
Tempodrom	Berlin	3,549 / 3,549 (100%)	$136,711
O_{2} Academy Glasgow	Glasgow	2,550 / 2,550 (100%)	$107,850
Sydney Opera House Forecourt	Sydney	11,624 / 11,624 (100%)	$938,726
Riverstage	Brisbane	8,871 / 9,500 (93%)	$513,608
Bridgestone Arena	Nashville	9,540 / 9,960 (96%)	$534,253
KeyArena	Seattle	7,898 / 12,623 (63%)	$538,607
Oracle Arena	Oakland	7,478 / 12,211 (61%)	$501,037
Barclays Center	Brooklyn	13,270 / 13,270 (100%)	$1,000,000 (Note: Pollstar reported gross sales of over $1,000,000 for the Barclays Center show.)
The Anthem	Washington, D.C.	6,000 / 6,000 (100%)	$624,700
Total		106,314 / 116,839 (91%)	$6,603,091
