= Ultrasound World Tour =

2025–2026 concert tour by Lorde

- Tour by Lorde
- Promotional poster
- Location: Europe; North America; Oceania
- Associated album: Virgin
- Start date: 17 September 2025
- End date: 10 October 2026
- No. of shows: 86
- Supporting acts: Blood Orange; Chanel Beads; Empress Of; The Japanese House; Jim-E Stack; Nilüfer Yanya; Fabiana Palladino; Erika de Casier; 2hollis; Kevin Abstract; Smerz; Sophia Stel

Lorde concert chronology
- Solar Power Tour (2022–23); Ultrasound World Tour (2025–26); Virgin Festival Run 2026 Tour (2026)

The Ultrasound World Tour was the fourth concert tour by New Zealand singer and songwriter Lorde, supporting her fourth studio album, Virgin (2025). Featuring arena concerts across North America, Europe, and Oceania, the tour began on 17 September 2025 in Austin, Texas, United States, and is concluded on 1 September 2026 in Esch-sur-Alzette, Luxembourg.

== Background ==
New Zealand singer and songwriter Lorde embarked on her third concert tour, the Solar Power Tour, in April 2022. The tour spanned 79 shows across five legs, concluding at the Praia Fluvial do Taboão in Portugal in August 2023. In April 2025, Lorde announced her comeback with the release of "What Was That", the lead single from her fourth studio album, Virgin, which was released on 27 June 2025. On 8 May 2025, Lorde announced the Ultrasound World Tour, featuring arena concerts across North America and Europe from September to December 2025. The opening acts are the Japanese House, Chanel Beads, Empress Of, and Nilüfer Yanya, as well as Virgin's co-producers Blood Orange and Jim-E Stack. On May 14, extra dates for Amsterdam, London, Washington, D.C., Nashville, and Minneapolis were added due to demand. French musician Oklou was initially announced as an opener for the original Esch-sur-Alzette date, but the concert was postponed without Oklou as an opener for the rescheduled date. On June 13, two shows in Brooklyn were announced.

Discussing the tour in a newsletter message sent to fans, Lorde wrote, "Every show I play is a collaboration between you and me. We meet in a room and we make music together, our bodies and the machines in search of something bigger together. 12 years of meeting up and making sound that's just for us. Since last time I've been stripping away unnecessary layers, finding us more room to move. I think that Ultrasound could be our masterpiece. Very proud and excited to be bringing my most talented friends in support. Come see what's under the skin." Following the announcement, some media publications noted the absence of New Zealand in the itinerary. In response to an Instagram post highlighting this omission, Lorde commented, "Cam awwwwwwn now lol", and added, "Just the beginning." Australian and New Zealand shows were later announced on 11 July. On 23 October, dates in three Mexican cities were revealed. On 27 January 2026, a date in Pula, Croatia was announced.

Tino Schaedler served as creative director for the tour, and Sam Penn as the photographer and documentarian.

== Set list ==
This set list is from the 17 September 2025 concert at the Moody Center in Austin, Texas. It is not representative of all shows during the tour.

1. "Hammer"
2. "Royals"
3. "Broken Glass"
4. "Buzzcut Season"
5. "Favourite Daughter"
6. "Perfect Places"
7. "Shapeshifter"
8. "Current Affairs"
9. "Supercut"
10. "No Better"
11. "GRWM"
12. "The Louvre"
13. "Oceanic Feeling"
14. "Big Star"
15. "Liability"
16. "Clearblue"
17. "Man of the Year"
18. "If She Could See Me Now"
19. "Team"
20. "What Was That"
21. "Green Light"
22. "David"
23. "Ribs"

=== Festival run ===
Beginning with her show on 5 June 2026 at the Governors Ball Music Festival, Lorde designed a new show with an altered set list. The following set list is from the Governors Ball and is not representative of all performances during the festival run.

1. "Don't Look For Me Now That I'm Gone"
2. "Royals"
3. "What Was That"
4. "Broken Glass"
5. "Perfect Places"
6. "Shapeshifter"
7. "Buzzcut Season"
8. "Favourite Daughter"
9. "The Louvre"
10. "Current Affairs"
11. "Hard Feelings"
12. "Oceanic Feeling"
13. "Liability"
14. "Hammer"
15. "Supercut"
16. "Team"
17. "Man of the Year"
18. "Girl, So Confusing featuring Lorde"
19. "Green Light"
20. "David"

Encore

21. "Ribs"

== Philanthropy and activism ==
During the tour, Lorde engaged in several philanthropic and political actions. In February 2026, she donated approximately $204,000 in merchandise proceeds from her Minneapolis shows to immigrant rights organizations, including the Minnesota Immigrant Rights Action Committee and the Immigrant Defense Network. The donation was announced alongside her public support for the “ICE Out” movement, which criticizes U.S. immigration enforcement practices.

The tour was also associated with political expression and related incidents at live events. At a concert at the O2 Arena in London, venue staff confiscated clothing worn by attendees displaying pro-Palestinian messages, citing a misinterpretation of venue policy. The venue later issued a public apology, stating that no such restriction existed and that the decision had been made in error. Lorde also expressed support of Palestinian causes during performances on the tour. During the song "Team", the stage lit up in the colours of the Palestinian flag, and at the New York City show, Lorde yelled "free fucking Palestine".

== Tour dates ==
List of 2025 concerts
Date (2025)	City	Country	Venue	Opening act(s)
17 September	Austin	United States	Moody Center	The Japanese House; Chanel Beads
19 September	Chicago	United States	United Center	The Japanese House; Chanel Beads
20 September	Nashville	United States	The Pinnacle	The Japanese House; Chanel Beads
21 September	Nashville	United States	The Pinnacle	The Japanese House; Chanel Beads
23 September	Columbus	United States	Value City Arena	The Japanese House; Chanel Beads
24 September	Toronto	Canada	Scotiabank Arena	The Japanese House; Chanel Beads
26 September	Boston	United States	TD Garden	The Japanese House; Blood Orange
27 September	Montreal	Canada	Bell Centre	The Japanese House; Blood Orange
30 September	Philadelphia	United States	Xfinity Mobile Arena	The Japanese House; Blood Orange
1 October	New York City	United States	Madison Square Garden	The Japanese House; Chanel Beads
3 October	Pittsburgh	United States	Petersen Events Center	The Japanese House; Chanel Beads
4 October	Washington, D.C.	United States	The Anthem	The Japanese House; Chanel Beads
5 October	Washington, D.C.	United States	The Anthem	The Japanese House; Chanel Beads
7 October	Duluth (Note: Labeled as Atlanta in promotion material.)	United States	Gas South Arena	The Japanese House; Empress Of
9 October	St. Louis	United States	Chaifetz Arena	The Japanese House; Empress Of
10 October	Milwaukee	United States	UW–Milwaukee Panther Arena	The Japanese House; Empress Of
11 October	Minneapolis	United States	Minneapolis Armory	The Japanese House; Empress Of
12 October	Minneapolis	United States	Minneapolis Armory	The Japanese House; Empress Of
14 October	Morrison	United States	Red Rocks Amphitheatre	The Japanese House; Blood Orange
17 October	Paradise (Note: Labeled as Las Vegas in promotion material.)	United States	MGM Grand Garden Arena	The Japanese House; Blood Orange
18 October	Inglewood (Note: Labeled as Los Angeles in promotion material.)	United States	Kia Forum	The Japanese House; Blood Orange; Empress Of
19 October	Berkeley (Note: Labeled as San Francisco in promotion material.)	United States	The Greek Theatre	The Japanese House; Empress Of
21 October	Portland	United States	Moda Center	The Japanese House; Empress Of
22 October	Seattle	United States	Climate Pledge Arena	The Japanese House; Empress Of
10 November	Paris	France	Zénith Paris	Jim-E Stack
15 November	Manchester	United Kingdom	AO Arena	Jim-E Stack; Blood Orange
16 November	London	United Kingdom	The O_{2} Arena	Jim-E Stack; Nilüfer Yanya
17 November	London	United Kingdom	The O_{2} Arena	Jim-E Stack; The Japanese House
19 November	Glasgow	United Kingdom	OVO Hydro	Jim-E Stack; Nilüfer Yanya
20 November	Birmingham	United Kingdom	Utilita Arena Birmingham	Jim-E Stack; Nilüfer Yanya
22 November	Dublin	Ireland	RDS Simmonscourt	Jim-E Stack; Nilüfer Yanya
24 November	Amsterdam	Netherlands	AFAS Live	Nilüfer Yanya
25 November	Amsterdam	Netherlands	AFAS Live	The Japanese House
27 November	Brussels	Belgium	Forest National	The Japanese House
29 November	Casalecchio di Reno (Note: Labeled as Bologna in promotion material.)	Italy	Unipol Arena	The Japanese House; Fabiana Palladino
30 November	Zürich	Switzerland	Halle 622	The Japanese House
1 December	Munich	Germany	Zenith	The Japanese House
3 December	Cologne	Germany	Palladium	The Japanese House
5 December	Berlin	Germany	Max-Schmeling-Halle	The Japanese House
6 December	Łódź	Poland	Atlas Arena	The Japanese House; Erika de Casier
8 December	Copenhagen	Denmark	Royal Arena	The Japanese House; Erika de Casier
9 December	Stockholm	Sweden	Annexet	The Japanese House
16 December	Brooklyn	United States	Barclays Center	2hollis
17 December	Brooklyn	United States	Barclays Center	2hollis

List of 2026 concerts
Date (2026)	City	Country	Venue	Opening act(s)
11 February	Auckland	New Zealand	Spark Arena	Kevin Abstract
13 February	Christchurch	New Zealand	Wolfbrook Arena	Kevin Abstract
16 February	Brisbane	Australia	Brisbane Entertainment Centre	Kevin Abstract
18 February	Sydney	Australia	Qudos Bank Arena	Kevin Abstract
19 February	Sydney	Australia	Qudos Bank Arena	Kevin Abstract
21 February	Melbourne	Australia	Rod Laver Arena	Kevin Abstract
22 February	Melbourne	Australia	Rod Laver Arena	Kevin Abstract
25 February	Perth	Australia	RAC Arena	Kevin Abstract
28 April	Monterrey	Mexico	Auditorio Banamex	Erika de Casier
29 April	Zapopan (Note: Labeled as Guadalajara in promotion material.)	Mexico	Auditorio Telmex	Erika de Casier
1 May	Mexico City	Mexico	Palacio de los Deportes	Erika de Casier
14 May	Inglewood	United States	Kia Forum	Smerz; Sophia Stel
15 May	Inglewood	United States	Kia Forum	Smerz; Sophia Stel
18 August	Pula	Croatia	Pula Arena	—N/a
1 September (Note: The concert in Esch-sur-Alzette on 1 September 2026 was originally scheduled to be on 9 November 2025; however, due to illness the show was postponed.)	Esch-sur-Alzette	Luxembourg	Rockhal	—N/a

== X-Ray Vision Extension ==
Following the end of her Ultrasound World Tour, Lorde is set to headline several music festivals across North America and Europe such as Lollapalooza and All Points East. In a similar manner to the Night Vision extension of her Solar Power Tour, Lorde performs with a different set, as well as alternate arrangements on some of her songs. Fans have called this the "X-Ray Vision Extension"

List of concerts, showing date, city, country, venue, and festival
Date (2026)	City	Country	Venue	Festival
5 June	New York City	United States	Flushing Meadows-Corona Park	Governors Ball Music Festival
7 June	Toronto	Canada	RBC Amphitheater	All Things Go Toronto
9 July	Madrid	Spain	Iberdrola Music	Mad Cool Festival
11 July	Algés	Portugal	Passeo Marítimo de Algés	NOS Alive
13 July	Nîmes	France	Arena of Nîmes	Festival de Nîmes
15 July	Lyon	France	Théâtre Antique de Fourvière	Le Nuits de Fourvière
16 July	Bern	Switzerland	Gurten Park	Gurtenfestival
18 July	Ostrava	Czech Republic	Dolní Vítkovice	Colours of Ostrava
19 July	Berlin	Germany	Olympiapark	Lollapalooza Berlin
21 July	Nyon	Switzerland	Plaine de l'Asse	Paléo Festival Nyon
23 July	Milan	Italy	Parco della Musica	Unaltrofestival
30 July	Chicago	United States	Grant Park	Lollapalooza
31 July	Saint Charles	United States	Avenue of the Saints Amphitheater	Hinterland Music Festival
2 August	Montreal	Canada	Parc Jean-Drapeau	Osheaga Music and Arts Festival
13 August	Poznań	Poland	Park Cytadela	BitterSweet Festival
14 August	Copenhagen	Denmark	Valbyparken	Syd for Solen
15 August	Gothenburg	Sweden	Slotsskogen	Way Out West
20 August	Saint Pölten	Austria	Greenpark	Frequency Festival
22 August	London	United Kingdom	Victoria Park	All Points East
23 August	Biddinghuizen	Netherlands	Spijk en Bremerberg	Lowlands Festival
25 August	Edinburgh	United Kingdom	Royal Highland Centre	Edinburgh Summer Sessions
27 August	Paris	France	Domaine National de Saint-Cloud	Rock en Seine
28 August	Bristol	United Kingdom	Clifton Down	Forwards Festival
31 August	Munich	Germany	Olympiapark	Superbloom Festival
3 October	Austin	United States	Zilker Park	Austin City Limits Music Festival
9 October	Yavapai County	United States	Arcosanti	FORM
10 October	Austin	United States	Zilker Park	Austin City Limits Music Festival
