= Sober (Lorde song) =

2017 promotional single by Lorde

Promotional single by Lorde

from the album Melodrama
- Released: 9 June 2017
- Studio: Electric Lady (New York); Rough Customer (Brooklyn Heights); Westlake (Los Angeles)
- Genre: Electro-R&B; alternative pop
- Length: 3:17
- Label: Lava; Republic
- Songwriters: Ella Yelich-O'Connor; Jack Antonoff
- Producers: Lorde; Antonoff; Malay

Audio video
- "Sober" on YouTube

"Sober" is a song recorded by New Zealand singer-songwriter Lorde, from her second studio album Melodrama (2017). Lorde co-wrote and co-produced the song with Jack Antonoff, with production assistance from Malay and vocal production from Kuk Harrell. It was released on 9 June 2017, by Republic as the album's second promotional single. "Sober" is the first of a two-track song, which is completed by "Sober II (Melodrama)". It is an electronic R&B and alternative pop song that features a tiger's roar, trumpets, brass and tenor and baritone saxophones in its production. The lyrics detail the desire to tell someone how you feel about them while wondering how it will be once the liquor wears down.

The song received mostly positive reviews from music critics who praised its unexpected direction and departure from the maximalist production of her previous singles "Green Light" and "Perfect Places". Its production style was compared to the works of English indie pop band the xx and English downtempo musician James Blake. The song had minor chart placements in Australia and Canada, placing at 61 and 84, respectively. Lorde performed "Sober", with five other songs, as part of a re-imagined Vevo series at the Electric Lady Studios where she recorded most of her album. It was also part of the set list of her Melodrama World Tour (2017–18).

== Background ==
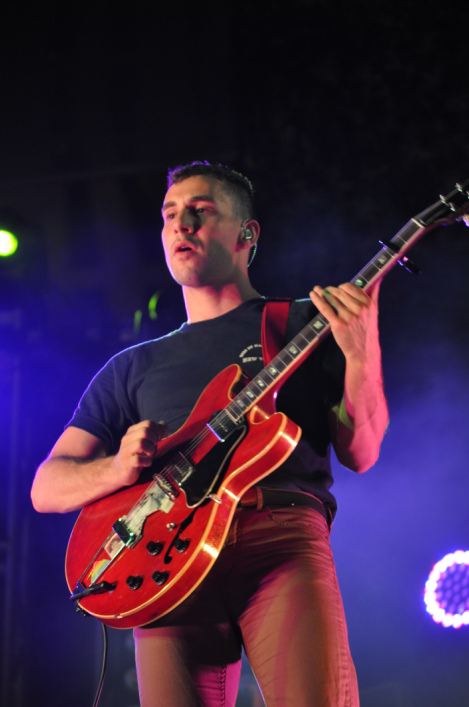
Jack Antonoff (pictured in 2012) co-wrote and co-produced "Sober".

In a podcast interview with Hrishikesh Hirway's Song Exploder, Lorde described her first summer after her breakup with longtime boyfriend James Lowe as "wild and fluorescent"; as a result, she would often go drinking in her native country of New Zealand and had a strong desire to cope with her heartache. Her fear of recording on Westlake Recording Studios, which to her was "too fancy", resulted in her exhibiting writer's block. She found a small production room, which she called "The Rat Nest", to create the song. The groove of the song, came after she played a show at Coachella, which was formed using a bongo drum and Lorde singing the words "night, midnight, lose my mind" which were subsequently sampled into the track.

On 7 November 2016, Lorde met with producer Malay in New York City at a session where he underlaid the groove she worked on with Antonoff into the whole song. In this session, she also developed the pause that occurs before the first verse. The horns in the track took inspiration from Hudson Mohawke's production work on TNGHT. She also wanted the track's brass and horns to sound triumphant, testing out a tenor and baritone saxophone as well as the trumpet; Laura Sisk oversaw this during engineering. The sound of a tiger's roar appears before the bridge, which was added two sessions before the song concluded when Antonoff was looking through song samples. According to Antonoff, this was one of his proudest moments when recording Melodrama.

== Recording and lyrical interpretation ==
"Sober"
A sample of "Sober", an electronic R&B and alternative pop number, which utilizes bongo drums, brass horns, trumpets, the tenor and baritone saxophones, and a tiger's roar in its production.

Lorde recorded "Sober" at three different locations in the United States. She began recording at Westlake Recording Studios, in Los Angeles, California, assisted by recording engineer Eric Eylands. Additional recording also took place at Electric Lady Studios, in Greenwich Village, New York with Malay. Recording was completed at Rough Customer Studios, Antonoff's home studio in Brooklyn Heights where he found the tiger's roar sample used in the track. John Hanes mixed the song at MixStar Studios. Laura Sisk served as the engineer for the track.

"Sober" is composed in the key of B major with a moody pop tempo of 110 beats per minute. Lorde's vocals span a range of E_{3} to C♯_{5} and its chord progression follows a basic sequence of E-G#m-F#. It is an electronic R&B and alternative pop song using bongo drums, trumpets, the tenor and baritone saxophones, brass and a hidden tiger's roar in its production. The track's production style was compared to the works of English indie pop band The xx and English downtempo musician James Blake. Dan Weiss from Consequence of Sound compared her vocal delivery to American musician Prince, while Lauren O'Neill from Noisey noted her vocals as having an "almost hoarse purr".

The New Yorker's Carrie Battan stated that the lines, "I know this story by heart / Jack and Jill get fucked up and get possessive when they get dark" were about the "experience of being too lucid to ever really feel drunk". PopMatters writer Andrew Dorsett also mentioned that the line referenced the "imagery of a weekend more euphoric than pills is a little familiar" but notes that Lorde looks "ahead" in the chorus line, "What will we do when we're sober?". Mike Neid from Idolator stated that the lyrics detail how "she drunkenly loses herself in a partner's temporary embrace at a party". O'Neill described "Sober" as the part "where things get a bit intense and your heart starts hurting a bit and you start making out with your ex".

== Critical reception ==
"Sober" received mostly positive reviews from music critics upon release. Reviewers compared its production to her work on 2013 debut album Pure Heroine, a departure from the maximalism of her previous singles "Green Light" and "Perfect Places". Spin writer Andy Cush called the song the "strangest" track Lorde had released so far." The National Public Radio called "Sober" a "stormy epic about risk and regret that's timed perfectly to coincide with the start of an eventful weekend," while Rolling Stone described the song as a "a sexy midtempo jam endlessly second-guessing its own pleasure". Spencer Kornhaber from The Atlantic called "Sober" one of album's highlights.

Writing for Pitchfork, Marc Hodges called the song "transitional", as if it was in "motion to somewhere else". He noted that while the name of the track was "less novel" for a performer like herself, the "execution was "still tough to deny." Idolator writer Neid stated that while the song was a "bit of a rehash of her previous material," it boasted some of the "most finessed productions" on the album. Despite several comments over the track's conventionality, it was listed at number one on Stereogum's top five songs of the week list for June 16. Peter from the publication commended the singer and Antonoff for being able to "capture the highs and the lows of a night out by crafting a banger that feels both understated and anthemic". DIY also placed "Sober" in their best tracks of the week list, with Will Richards complementing how "wonderfully versatile Lorde has become, and how effortlessly she slips into each guise."

== Live performances ==
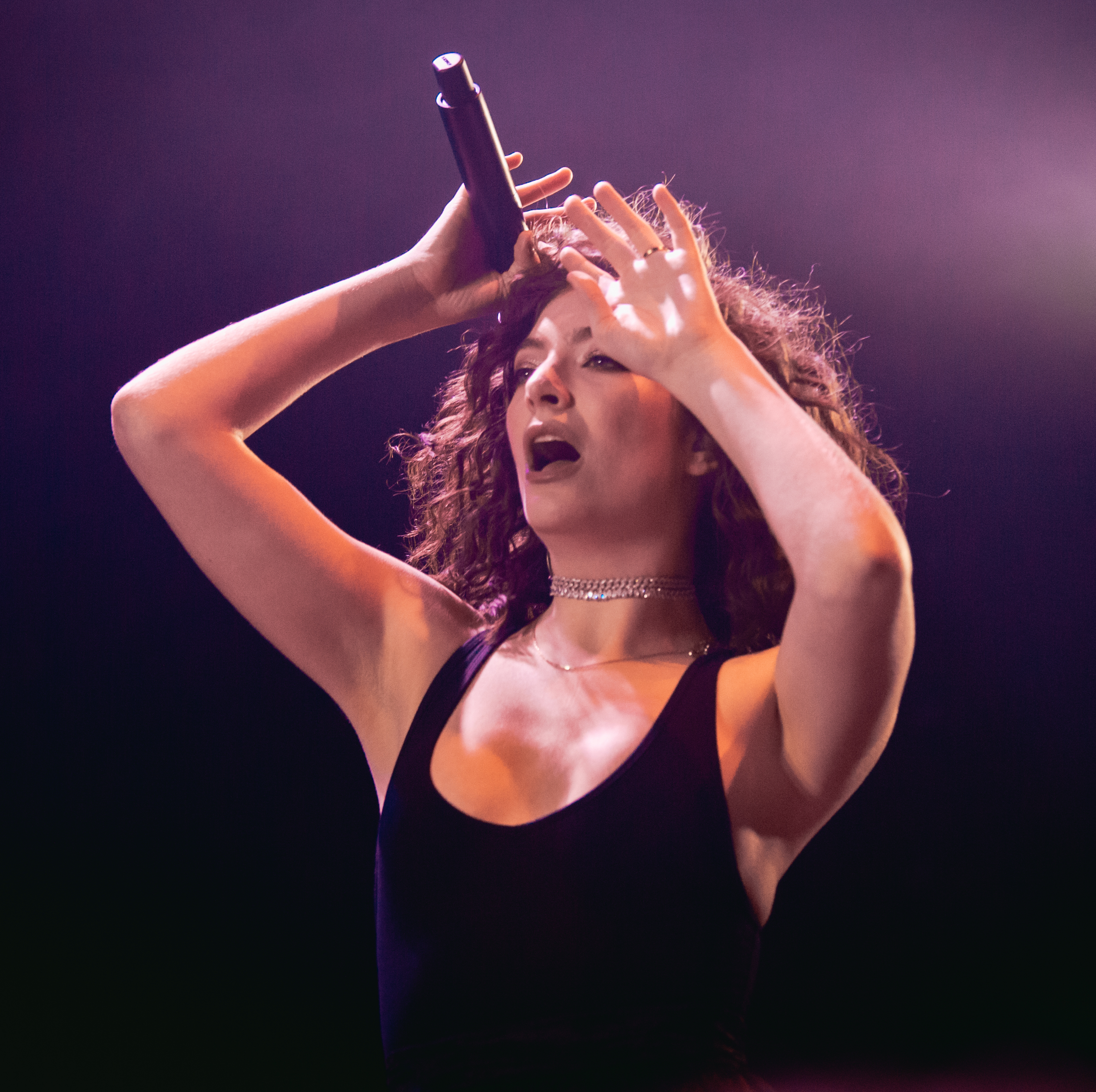
Lorde performing "Sober" at Roskilde Festival in June 2017

Lorde debuted "Sober" at a "tiny pre-Coachella gig" to a crowd of 240 at Pappy & Harriet's on 15 April 2017. Tickets sold out in minutes. Eve Barlow from Billboard praised the performance, saying that it was "heartwarming to watch Lorde engage with such easy confidence" on stage, noting her growth in her level of comfort with the crowd. She also performed the song at the Governors Ball on 2 June 2017. During the performance, a tilted box was used, pointing downward. At the end, the box opens and Lorde falls into the arms of her dancers. NME called the performance "simple, but delivered with so much poise and finesse, you can't help but be impressed." Lorde performed "Sober", with five other songs, as part of a re-imagined Vevo series at the Electric Lady Studios where she recorded most of her album, and was part of the set list for her Melodrama World Tour (2017–18) and Solar Power Tour (2022–23).

== Credits and personnel ==
Credits adapted from the liner notes of Melodrama.

Recording and management

- Published by Songs Music Publishing, Sony/ATV Songs, LLC, and Ducky Donath Music (BMI)
- Recorded at Electric Lady Studios (New York, New York), Rough Customer Studios (Brooklyn Heights, New York), and Westlake Recording Studios (Los Angeles)
- Mixed at MixStar Studios (Virginia Beach, Virginia)
- Mastered at Sterling Sound Studios

Personnel

- Lorde – songwriter, vocals, producer
- Jack Antonoff – songwriter, producer
- Malay – producer
- Kuk Harrell – vocal production
- Laura Sisk – engineer
- Greg Eliason – assistant engineering
- Barry McCready – assistant engineering
- Brendan Morawski – assistant engineering
- Seth Paris – assistant engineering
- Serban Ghebea – mixing
- John Hanes – mixing engineer
- Randy Merrill – mastering

== Charts ==
Chart (2017)	Peak position
Australia (ARIA)	61
Canada (Canadian Hot 100)	84
New Zealand (Recorded Music NZ)	18

== Certifications ==
Region	Certification	Certified units/sales
Australia (ARIA)	Gold	35,000^{‡}
Brazil (Pro-Música Brasil)	Gold	30,000^{‡}
Canada (Music Canada)	Gold	40,000^{‡}
New Zealand (RMNZ)	Gold	15,000^{‡}
^{‡} Sales+streaming figures based on certification alone.
