= Chanel Beads =

American music group

- Genres: Dream pop; hypnagogic pop
- Label: Jagjaguwar
- Members: Shane Lavers; Maya McGrory; Zachary Paul
- Website: chanelbeads.com

Chanel Beads is an American New York City-based group fronted by musicians Shane Lavers, Maya McGrory, and Zachary Paul. They are currently signed to Jagjaguwar. Lavers works closely with Maya McGrory, also known as Colle.

== History ==
On 8 November 2023, Chanel Beads released a single, "Police Scanner", for an upcoming album. Following the release of two further singles, "Idea June" and "Embarrassed Dog". Their debut album eventually released on 19 April 2024, titled Your Day Will Come.

On 1 October 2025, Chanel Beads released a single, "The Coward Forgets His Nightmare" followed by two further singles, "Song for the Messenger" and "Dust in the Wind". Their second album, titled the same as the previous, was released on 26 June 2026.

== Discography ==
Albums

- Your Day Will Come (2024)
- Your Day Will Come (2026)

Extended Plays

- Zut Alors (2018)

Singles

- Strobe Light Two / Layup (2020)
- Let's Go Out Tonight (2022)
- Ef / Shining Armor (2022)
- True Altruism / Ache (2022)
- Police Scanner (2023)
- Idea June (2024)
- Embarrassed Dog (2024)
- On the Everlasting Arms / Instrumental (2024)
- The Coward Forgets His Nightmare (2025)
- Song for the Messenger (2026)
- Dust in the Wind (2026)
