= The Louvre (song) =

2017 song by Lorde

Song by Lorde

from the album Melodrama
- Studio: Conway (Los Angeles); Rough Customer (Brooklyn Heights); Westlake (Los Angeles)
- Genre: Electropop
- Length: 4:31
- Label: Lava; Republic
- Songwriters: Ella Yelich-O'Connor; Jack Antonoff
- Producers: Lorde; Antonoff; Flume; Malay

"The Louvre" is a song recorded by New Zealand singer-songwriter Lorde for her second album, Melodrama (2017). She co-wrote and co-produced the track with Jack Antonoff, with additional production from Flume and Malay. "The Louvre" is an electropop song that has influences of other genres such as indie rock and ambient music. Its name derives from the Louvre, an art museum in Paris, France. The lyrics talk about Lorde's honest, lightly-manic analysis of a newly-sparked romance comparing it to a painting hung behind the quintessential works of the Louvre.

Reviewers praised the song's lyrics and production, and it landed on several year-end lists. Its guitar riff was compared to Bruce Springsteen's song "Born to Run" (1975), and the sound to Taylor Swift's album 1989 (2014). The track centers around themes of obsession and infatuation as it continues the narrative established in the previous song, "Homemade Dynamite". Lorde performed "The Louvre", with five other songs, as part of a re-imagined Vevo series at the Electric Lady Studios where she recorded most of her album, and at the 2017 Glastonbury Festival. It was part of the set list of her Melodrama (2017–18), Solar Power (2022-23) and Ultrasound (2025-26) concert tours.

== Recording and composition ==
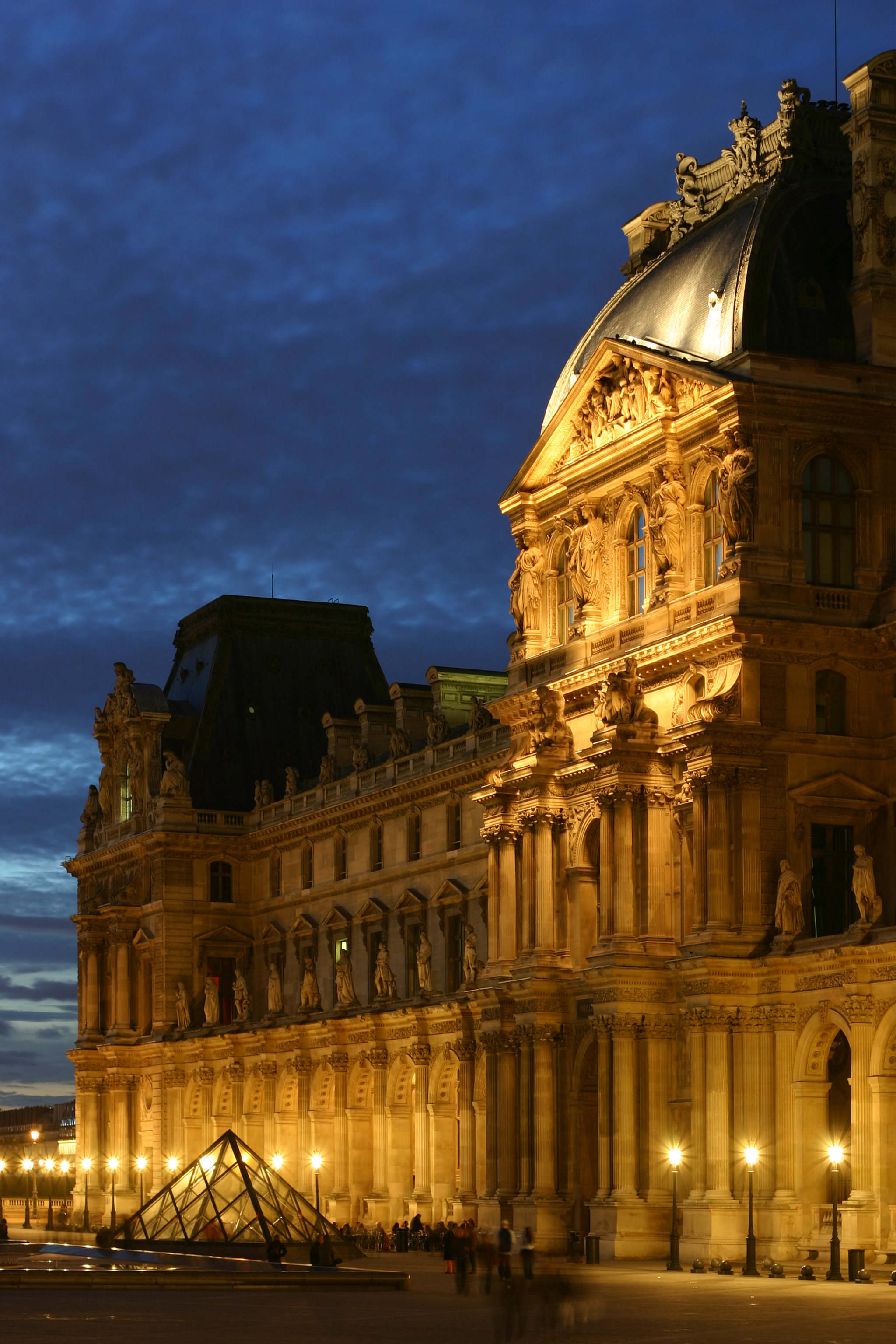
The Louvre art museum in Paris, France, the song's namesake (pictured)

Lorde recorded "The Louvre" at three different locations in the United States. She began recording at Conway Recording Studios, in Los Angeles, California, assisted by recording engineer Eric Eylands. They also recorded at Rough Customer Studio, in Brooklyn Heights, New York, with Barry McCready and Jack Antonoff. Recording was completed at Westlake Recording Studios, in Los Angeles, with Greg Eliason. John Hanes mixed the song at MixStar Studios. Flume provided the song's bass line and drums, while Malay produced the electronic beats. Both provided additional production for the track.

"The Louvre" is composed in the key of C Major with a tempo of 124 beats per minute. Lorde's vocals span a range of E_{3} to A_{4} and its chord progression follows a sequence of C–C/E–F_{5}–A_{5}–G_{5} in the verses and outro. It is an electropop song, with influences of other genres such as indie rock and ambient music. According to Nolan Feeley of Entertainment Weekly, "The Louvre" describes the early stages of a casual relationship "doomed to fail". The song starts with Lorde's voice accompanied by a guitar, before becoming "a storm of glitchy electro-pop." NME described it as a "wide-eyed, heart-skippy pop" track. Alexis Petridis of The Guardian stated that it seemed "highly unlikely that any pop song this year" would craft a better chorus than "The Louvre". Newsweek noted Phil Collins' influence on the track, while its guitar riff was compared to Bruce Springsteen's song "Born to Run" (1975) and the production on Taylor Swift's album 1989 (2014).

In a podcast interview with The Spinoff, Lorde revealed that she wanted to evoke the feeling of the "big sun-soaked dumbness of falling in love," and the intense emotion of "big dumb joy". She said that the "instrumentation" helped reflect those emotions. The singer also disclosed that Frank Ocean's Blonde (2016) album served as inspiration for constructing the track's sound. Lorde spoke of how in a "post-Blonde landscape", instrumentation in songs has become more flexible. She stated that she could have made a "big, easy single" but refrained from doing so as she felt it would not mean much to "simplify the journey" or "force a big chorus."

== Reception ==
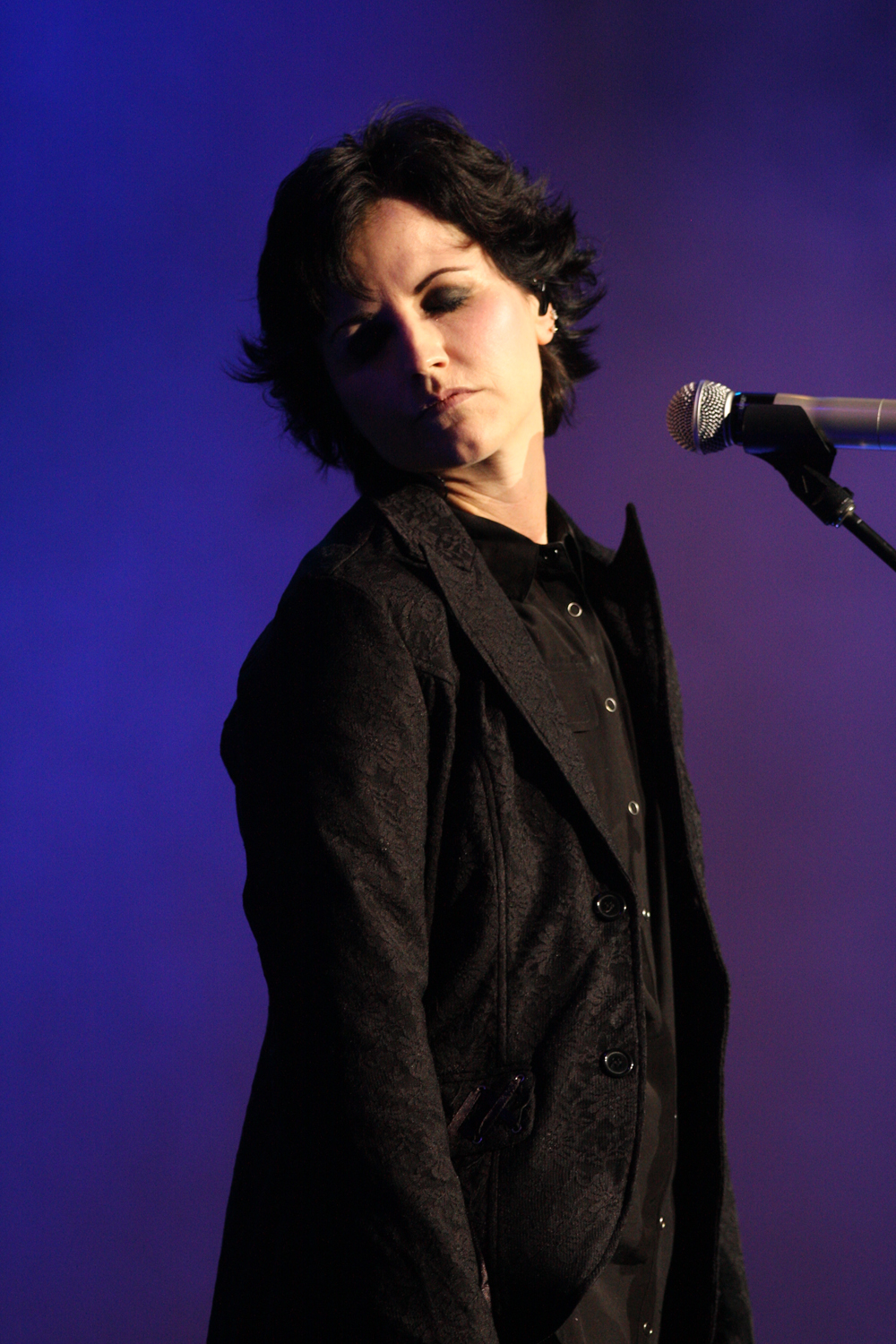
The song's guitar outro was compared to Irish rock band The Cranberries (Dolores O'Riordan pictured).

"The Louvre" received widespread critical acclaim from music critics, with many praising its lyrics and production; it was also called a stand-out track on Melodrama. In a review roundup for The Fader, editor Aimee Cliff said that Lorde captured the "self-importance of first love so well." Patrick D. McDermott compared the guitar outro to the work of The Cure or The Cranberries. Will Richards from DIY noted that a "rushed lyric half way through the second verse epitomises the whole record". Kitty Empire of The Guardian called it a "dazzling synthesis of pro-dramatics and originality", while Pitchfork's Stacey Anderson noted the song captured a "shared frequency of love just as irrepressibly grandiose as its sound".

Several critics placed "The Louvre" on their year-end, best songs lists. Stereogum put the recording in the number 13 spot on its year-end list. On their year-end list, Vice editor Larry Fitzmaurice ranked the song at number 47, calling it one of the album's "weirdest moments". On Spin's year-end list, "The Louvre" was ranked at number nine, with the publication calling it one of Lorde's "strongest [songs] to date". Pitchfork ranked the track at number 42 of the year-end list, while on their retrospective list of the 200 Best Songs of the 2010s, "The Louvre" ranked at number 43. The publication praised Lorde for being able to take a "feeling everyone knows and transform it into something fresh".

"The Louvre" entered the Recorded Music NZ Heatseeker Singles chart at number one on 26 June 2017. It also entered the NZ Artists Singles Chart at number five that week, before peaking at number four. It was certified platinum by the Australian Recording Industry Association (ARIA) for exceeding 70,000 equivalent units.

== Live performances ==
Lorde first performed "The Louvre" at the Glastonbury Festival. The performance began with a clear box slowly filling with dancers, followed by Lorde's arrival. The box was described as tilting "back-and-forth" above the singer's head as the performance continued. She dedicated the track to any audience member "harbouring a secret crush." The performance received acclaim from critics, with The Independent giving it a four out of five-star review, calling it a "bold and brilliant" debut.

The track was also performed at the Bowery Auditorium in New York City, on the night of the singer's album release party, with two other tracks. For the Melodrama World Tour (2017–18), Lorde performed "The Louvre" after her first costume change. It was proceeded by vintage video snippets that flicker across a "giant old-school TV." A reviewer for the London Evening Standard described the videos as "art and music merged into a cohesive exploration of love, loss and loneliness." The track was performed second in a set of three acts. After the clips, Lorde returned to the stage wearing a white gown, a different look from the black chiffon dress she wore earlier. She prefaced each song with a backstory, saying "The Louvre" is about the "ups and downs of a new crush."

The song was also included in the set lists of the Solar Power Tour (2022-23) and the Ultrasound World Tour (2025-26).

== Credits and personnel ==
Credits adapted from the liner notes of Melodrama.

Recording and management

- Published by Songs Music Publishing, Sony/ATV Songs, LLC, and Ducky Donath Music (BMI)
- Recorded at Conway Recording Studios, Westlake Recording Studios (Los Angeles) and Rough Customer Studio (Brooklyn Heights, New York)
- Mixed at MixStar Studios (Virginia Beach, Virginia)
- Mastered at Sterling Sound Studios (New York City)

Personnel

- Lorde – songwriting, vocals, production
- Jack Antonoff – songwriting, production
- Flume – additional production
- Malay – additional production
- Serban Ghenea – mix engineering
- John Hanes – mixing
- Randy Merrill – mastering
- Barry McCready – engineering assistance
- Eric Eylands – engineering assistance
- Greg Eliason – engineering assistance
- Laura Sisk – engineering

== Charts ==
Chart (2017)	Peak position
New Zealand Artist Singles (RMNZ)	4
New Zealand Heatseekers (RMNZ)	1

== Certifications ==
Region	Certification	Certified units/sales
Australia (ARIA)	Platinum	70,000^{‡}
Brazil (Pro-Música Brasil)	Gold	30,000^{‡}
Canada (Music Canada)	Gold	40,000^{‡}
New Zealand (RMNZ)	Platinum	30,000^{‡}
^{‡} Sales+streaming figures based on certification alone.
