= Supercut (song) =

2017 song by Lorde

Song by Lorde

from the album Melodrama
- Studio: Electric Lady (New York); Rough Customer (Brooklyn Heights); Westlake (Los Angeles)
- Genre: Synth-pop; electropop; electronic; disco
- Length: 4:38
- Label: Lava; Republic
- Songwriters: Ella Yelich-O'Connor; Jack Antonoff
- Producers: Lorde; Antonoff; Joel Little

"Supercut" is a song by New Zealand singer-songwriter Lorde from her second album, Melodrama (2017). Lorde co-wrote the track with Jack Antonoff, both of whom also co-produced it with Joel Little, with additional production from Frank Dukes, Jean-Benoît Dunckel and Malay. It is a synth-pop, electropop, electronic, and disco song that draws influence from other genres, such as dance, electro house, electronica and new wave music. The track's name, supercut, is a word coined by Andy Baio and is defined as a compilation of short video clips of the same type of action. The lyrics are about Lorde reviewing her most joyful memories from a previous relationship and realising the illusion is no longer present.

Music critics praised the song, with many comparing its production to the works of American musician Bruce Springsteen and Swedish singer Robyn. "Supercut" was included in the soundtrack of the 2019 Netflix film Someone Great. It was one of five songs used as part of a re-imagined Vevo series at the Electric Lady Studios, where she recorded most of her album. Lorde included "Supercut" in the set list for the Melodrama World Tour (2017–2018), the Solar Power Tour (2022–2023), and the Ultrasound World Tour (2025–2026).

== Background ==
In an interview with The Spinoff, Lorde recalled leaving a party late at night and driving around Ponsonby Road in Auckland in a taxi listening to Paul Simon's 1986 album Graceland. While driving, she heard music playing from nearby bars. Lorde wanted to feel as if one was "dancing through the walls of a party". The singer wrote the track with this concept in mind when she arrived to the United States. After recording "Supercut", she would play it as she left The Spotted Pig, a gastro pub in the West Village area of Lower Manhattan, after midnight. Despite not being credited as a recording location on the song's liner notes, the singer recorded the track at Jungle City. During takes, Lorde placed a microphone in the corner of the studio, stood 3 m (10 ft) away from it, and recorded her verses. She compared the end result to an answering machine or voice note. The pair constructed most of the track using drums and then "filled in the blanks" with a piano. Lorde called "Supercut" a "sister song" to "Ribs" from her 2013 debut album Pure Heroine.

== Recording and composition ==
Jack Antonoff (pictured in 2023) co-wrote and co-produced "Supercut".

Lorde recorded "Supercut" in three locations around the United States. She began recording at Electric Lady Studios in Greenwich Village, New York City, with assistance from Barry McCready and Jack Antonoff. Antonoff also worked with Lorde at Rough Customer Studio in Brooklyn Heights, New York. Recording concluded at Westlake Recording Studios in Los Angeles, California, with assistance from Ben Sedano and Greg Eliason. Serban Ghenea mixed the song at MixStar Studios with assistance from engineer John Hanes. The track was mastered by Randy Merrill at Sterling Sound in New York. Other personnel include Joel Little, as well as Frank Dukes, Jean-Benoît Dunckel, Malay, who provided additional production to the song.

"Supercut" is composed in the key of C major with a tempo of 124 beats per minute. Lorde's vocals span a range of A_{3} to E_{5} and its chord progression follows a basic sequence of C–F^{sus2}–Am-F. It is a synth-pop, electropop, electronic, and disco song, which has influences of other genres such as dance, electro house, electronica, and new wave music. The track's lyrics recall Lorde's highlights from a previous relationship. "Supercut" features an interpolation of the piano melody from her 2017 single, "Green Light". According to Ava Muir of Exclaim!, the track is driven by a "hauntingly infectious pulse". In an analysis of the album, Lindsay Zoladz from The Ringer said the song is associated in popular culture with the "relationship’s 'perfect' moments captured in cropped, filtered Instagrams that we flick through after they [are] over".

== Reception ==
"Supercut" received critical acclaim from music critics, with many calling it a stand-out track on Melodrama. The track received comparisons to the works of American musician Bruce Springsteen and Swedish singer Robyn. Mike Neid from Idolator wrote that the track delivered "one of the most gracefully crafted lyrics on the album", and called it a "joyful release that offers a sliver of hope for new beginnings". Writing for The Independent, Roisin O'Connor praised the song's unusual "quirks" in its production, which help "expose the inner workings of her music". O'Connor also said Lorde "respects pop for what it is and what it is capable of". Chris Willman of Variety called it the album's "mini masterpiece".

The track appeared in several music critics' year-end lists. Stereogum placed the song at number two on their year-end list, calling the lyrics "genius, the music a propulsive mirage" and the overall effect "overwhelming and tingly". Lindsay Zoladz from The Ringer also placed the song at number two on her list, describing it as "a precise distillation of the ways the internet shapes and warps how we experience life". NME included "Supercut" at number 29 on their year-end list, while Vulture ranked it at number four on their year-end list. Dee Lockett from the publication stated that the track was a "misshapen puzzle whose beauty is greater for its flaws." Andy Baio, the person who coined the term, praised Lorde for using it in her song. "Supercut" was certified gold by the Australian Recording Industry Association (ARIA) for exceeding 35,000 shipments.

Billboard named "Supercut" as the third greatest breakup song of all time, while Insider ranked the song at number 28 on their list of the 50 Best Breakup Songs of the 21st Century.

== Live performances and other usage ==
Lorde first performed "Supercut", along with two other tracks, at the Bowery Auditorium in New York City on the night of the singer's Melodrama album release party. She also performed the track on 1Live, which was described as "breathtaking" and emotional. "Supercut" was one of five songs Lorde performed as part of a re-imagined Vevo series at the Electric Lady Studios where she recorded most of her album. For the Melodrama World Tour (2017–18), Lorde performed "Supercut" after her last costume change and a video interlude. It was the first track she performed from the prelude of the show's third and final segment, which was composed of five songs. Lorde also included it on the setlist for her Solar Power Tour (2022–23) and the ongoing Ultrasound World Tour (2025–); during the performance, she sings the song while running on a treadmill.

Norwegian pop punk band Sløtface covered the song at Australian radio station Triple J; Consequence of Sound described the cover as "cleaned up from the dance floor while forfeiting none of its emotional core". Sløtface's cover replaces the electronics of the production with a "reverberating guitar". Lorde responded to the group's cover, calling it "rad". It was included in the official soundtrack for the video game FIFA 18; NME described the track as "the one" and called it one of the soundtrack's "killer tunes". The song was also featured in the soundtrack for the 2019 Netflix film Someone Great; director Jennifer Kaytin Robinson stated in an interview with Rolling Stone that "Supercut" was a source of inspiration while developing the film's screenplay. As a result, she wrote the song into the film's script before "any of the people in the movie existed". "Supercut" is used in "W.O.M.B.", the sixth episode in the third season of You.

== El-P remix ==
"Supercut" (El-P remix)

Remix by Lorde featuring Run the Jewels
- Released: 28 February 2018
- Genre: Trip hop
- Length: 3:36
- Label: Universal
- Songwriters: Ella Yelich-O'Connor; Jack Antonoff; Michael Render; Jaime Meline
- Producer: El-P

Lorde posted a tweet on 27 February 2018 that a "small surprise" would be sent to fans who subscribed to her newsletter. The following day, a remix of the song produced by El-P of the hip hop group Run the Jewels, was released via email. Talking about the remix, Lorde said, "I love it. So much. My little nerd heart is full." Initially made available for free download to commemorate the arrival of her North American tour, the remix was released to streaming services worldwide on 9 March 2018.

The El-P remix of "Supercut" was described as a trip hop track with bass and synthesiser production. It features vocals from Lorde and rap verses from Killer Mike and El-P that deliver observations on society and the portrayal of enemies. It received positive reviews from music critics, with some praising the duo for adding a darker melody to the original upbeat composition. Stereogum writer Claymore Tully noted that the remix's slower tempo turned the "fairly upbeat, dance-ready track" into a "sludgy slow-burner". Eric Skelton of Pigeons and Planes lauded Mike and El-P's "high-energy" verses, stating that the remix "was made with large arenas in mind." It charted at number nine on the New Zealand Heatseekers chart.

== Credits and personnel ==
Credits adapted from the liner notes of Melodrama.

Recording and management

- Published by Songs Music Publishing, Sony/ATV Songs LLC, and Ducky Donath Music (BMI)
- Recorded at Electric Lady Studios (New York, New York), Rough Customer Studio (Brooklyn Heights, New York), and Westlake Recording Studios (Los Angeles, California)
- Mixed at Mixstar Studios (Virginia Beach, Virginia)
- Mastered at Sterling Sound Studios (New York City)

Personnel

- Lorde – songwriter, vocals, producer
- Jack Antonoff – songwriter, producer
- Joel Little – producer, keyboards, programming
- Frank Dukes – additional production
- Jean-Benoît Dunckel – additional production
- Malay – additional production
- Serban Ghenea – mixing
- John Hanes – mixing engineer
- Randy Merrill – mastering
- Barry McCready – assistant engineer
- Ben Sedano – assistant engineer
- Greg Eliason – assistant engineer
- Laura Sisk – engineer

== Charts ==
Chart (2018)	Peak position
New Zealand Heatseekers (RMNZ) El-P remix	9

== Certifications ==
Region	Certification	Certified units/sales
Australia (ARIA)	2× Platinum	140,000^{‡}
Brazil (Pro-Música Brasil)	Gold	30,000^{‡}
Canada (Music Canada)	Platinum	80,000^{‡}
New Zealand (RMNZ)	2× Platinum	60,000^{‡}
United Kingdom (BPI)	Gold	400,000^{‡}
United States (RIAA)	Platinum	1,000,000^{‡}
^{‡} Sales+streaming figures based on certification alone.
