= Perfect Places =

2017 single by Lorde

Single by Lorde

from the album Melodrama
- Released: 1 June 2017
- Studio: Electric Lady (New York); Conway (Los Angeles); Westlake (Los Angeles)
- Genre: Electropop
- Length: 3:41
- Label: Universal New Zealand
- Songwriters: Ella Yelich-O'Connor; Jack Antonoff
- Producers: Lorde; Jack Antonoff; Andrew Wyatt

Lorde singles chronology
"Green Light" (2017)	"Perfect Places" (2017)	"Homemade Dynamite (Remix)" (2017)

Music video
- "Perfect Places" on YouTube

"Perfect Places" is a song by New Zealand singer-songwriter Lorde. It was released on 1 June 2017 through Universal Music New Zealand as the second single, following "Green Light" (2017), from her second album, Melodrama (2017). Lorde co-wrote and co-produced the song with Jack Antonoff and Andrew Wyatt, with additional production from Frank Dukes. "Perfect Places" was described as an atmospheric electropop song that blends bass, synths and drum machine beats. In the lyrics, Lorde follows the conclusion of the "teenage party circuit" in Melodrama, wondering where her perfect places are.

The track was acclaimed by music critics, with many commending Lorde's songwriting. While it failed to chart in the United States, "Perfect Places" had minor chart placements in Australia, Canada and the United Kingdom. An accompanying music video for the song was directed by Grant Singer, who also filmed the visual for the album's lead single "Green Light", and premiered on Lorde's Vevo account on 3 August 2017. It shows the artist in various shots alone at the beach, in a restaurant and on a boat. Lorde further promoted "Perfect Places" by performing it live on television on several occasions.

Lorde performed the song on the Melodrama (2017-18), Solar Power (2022-23), and Ultrasound (2025-26) concert tours.

== Background and development ==
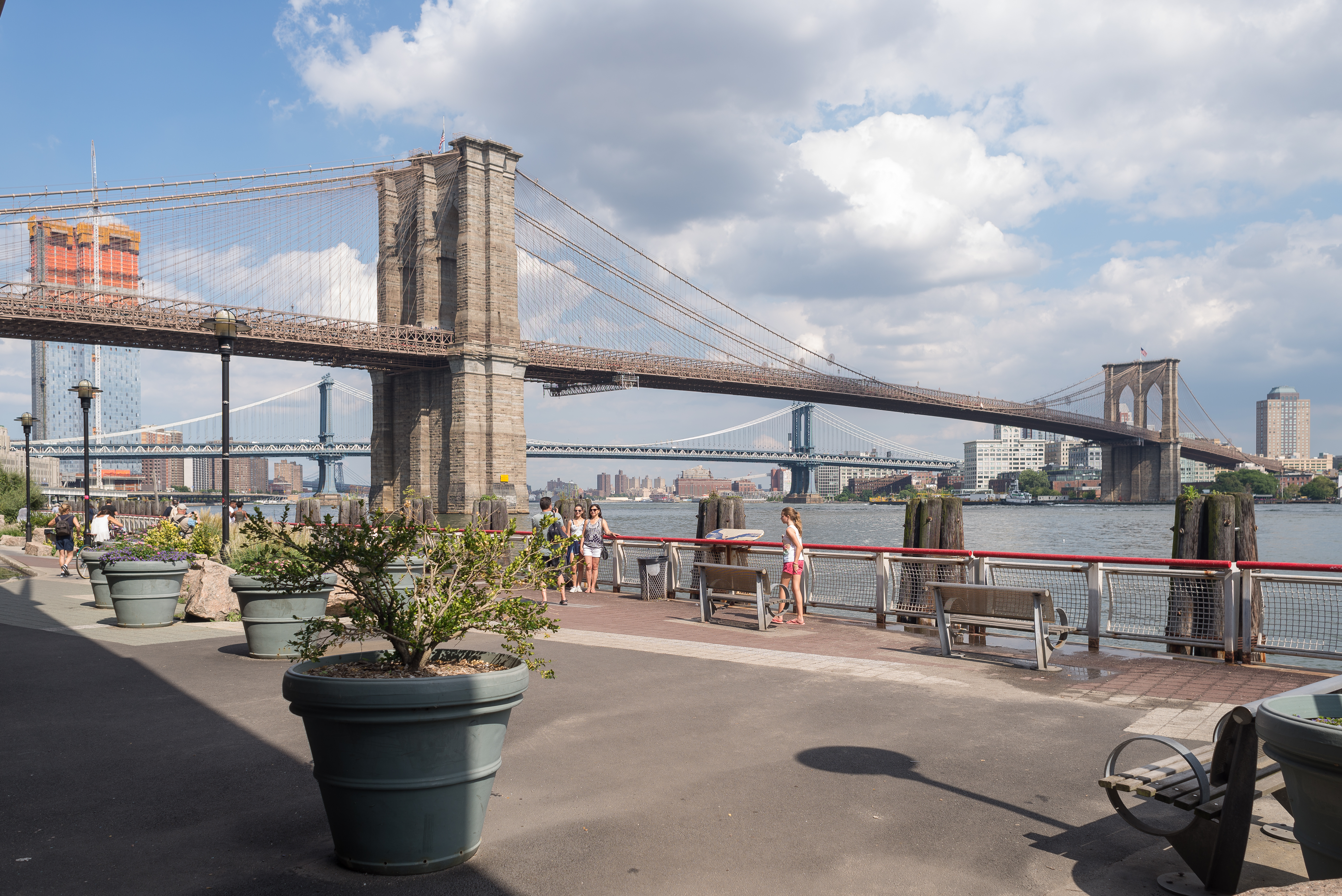
Lorde took several bicycle trips to the Brooklyn Bridge (pictured), which served as inspiration for "Perfect Places".

When speaking to The New York Times about the song's composition, Lorde said that it "lived a million times." She added that both she and Jack Antonoff tried "different tempos, used different voicings, took it half time, made it weird and druggy," but nothing worked. One of their issues was how much depth there was to the song. Searching for a solution, Lorde thought of deleting its pre-chorus, and did so saying the track then "follow[ed] a much simpler trajectory."

However, the pair still had "not cracked the code." As they were working on a hook, the idea of having a multi-track vocals from Lorde came up. They proceeded to belt "out the words together beneath the main vocal" line. During recording sessions, Lorde sang multiple takes and changed the sound by moving away or getting closer to the microphone in different parts. In post-production, her takes were then layered on top of each other.

The work of English singer Kate Bush served as an inspiration for a harmony in the second half of the song. The lyric "Now I don't know which way to go" was changed to "Now I can't stand to be alone" as the pair felt it was too "wishy-washy." On the track's release date, Lorde revealed that riding on the Brooklyn Bridge during the summer and sitting on the Uptown Manhattan subway in the heat, coupled with frequent flights to her residence in New Zealand, prompted her to write the song.

== Composition and lyrics ==
Lorde and Antonoff wrote and co-produced the song with production handled mainly by Andrew Wyatt and Frank Dukes. "Perfect Places" is an atmospheric electropop song that blends bass, synths and drum machine beats. Sarah Grant of Rolling Stone wrote that the verse structures are "punctuated with throbbing syncopation, giving the song a dark, R&B sensibility." Spin noted that the track's "stock dramatic chord movement was backed by church-bell and piano knells." According to sheet music published at Musicnotes.com by Sony/ATV Music Publishing, "Perfect Places" is set in common time with a "moderate" tempo of 105 beats per minute. The song is composed in the key of E major, with Lorde's vocal range between the notes of C_{3} and C_{5}.

Lorde annotated several of the song's lyrics exclusively on Genius. She wrote the lyric "Watch the wasters blow the speakers" in November 2016, when she was standing on her porch watching her friends fiddle with the speakers inside. Another verse, "I hate the headlines and the weather" came together on a late summer day in New York, with the singer noting how horrific the news was every day. The last lyric she annotated was "Now I can't stand to be alone" which Lorde says she wrote after realizing the main reason for her partying habits was "dreading sitting at home" by herself hearing her thoughts "hit the walls." The chorus line "All our heroes fading" was a reference to the deaths of English singer David Bowie and American musician Prince in 2016.

== Critical reception ==
"Perfect Places" received critical acclaim from music critics, with several comparing the song to her 2013 single "Team". Jenn Pelly of Pitchfork awarded it "Best New Track", writing that the song "slides in on a spacious, charcoal beat à la Pure Heroine's 'Team,' but reality has grown crueler since then." Pelly further described Lorde as a "songwriter who still vividly celebrates out-of-step self-possession." Winston Cook-Wilson of Spin compared the lyrics' setting to "Green Light" and added that the song had "a charm [in its] imperfectness," in that Lorde does not know where she is headed. Wilson said the track's main message is that there is "no perfect place" even when "pursuing it leaves you feeling just as lost [...] as you were at the start."

In a series of reviews by five editors on PopMatters, the average score for the track was a 7.4 out of 10. Chris Tiessen commended Lorde's "melodies, rhythmic delivery, and vocal layering" saying they were at a "peak performance." Conversely, Steve Horowitz gave it a mixed review, saying that Lorde "carries the patina of jaded adolescence" but the "passion" seems "elusive." In contrast, Chris Ingalls called it "highly infectious" and "brand new" saying it already sounded "classic and timeless." Adriane Pontecorvo called the track a "good end-of-summer single choice," which is "emotional, both carefree and bittersweet," saying Lorde has "done more interesting songs before," but she ended by calling it a "solid" single. Sharing similar sentiments, Mike Schiller said the song "doesn't quite land the way it feels like it should," but asserts the singer "remains fascinating and impossible to simply ignore." Noisey editor Phil Witmer called it a "triumphant closer" to the album and felt the chorus is like the refrain of The Beatles' "Hey Jude" (1968) except it "actually slaps."

National Public Radio ranked the song number 36 on their 100 Best Songs of 2017 list. The Guardian critic placed the track on its Sounds like Summer list, likening the chorus to Taylor Swift's "Blank Space" (2014), but commending the recording for retaining "Lorde’s singular melancholia." Pigeons and Planes editor Joyce ranked the song at number four on their Best Songs of 2017 list calling it one of Lorde's "most mature offerings yet." Complex ranked the song at number 22 on its year-end list, labelling it "an earnest, yearning pop anthem that would have been the best song on Pure Heroine." It was ranked the 71st greatest song of 2017 by Australian alternative music station Triple J.

== Music video ==
=== Background ===
The accompanying music video for "Perfect Places" was directed by Grant Singer, who also directed the visual for "Green Light". The video was shot in Jamaica. It was released on Lorde's YouTube channel on 3 August 2017.

On the video's release, Lorde took to Twitter to announce a series of subliminal references in the visual for fans to find. A scene where Lorde holds a lightbulb as a microphone in a dark-lit room interpolates Paramore's "Ignorance" (2009) video, while another shot with her nearly submerging her body in a small pond was compared to the group's visual for "Monster" (2011). During "Perfect Places", Lorde sits alone in a restaurant with several empty champagne glasses around her; this reference is taken directly from the Melodrama track "Sober II (Melodrama)" where she sings: "Oh, how fast the evening passes / Cleaning up the champagne glasses."

The yellow dress and safari-style hat worn by Lorde in the music video take inspiration from a similar outfit of Tarzan's Jane. The dress has also been compared to the one Beyoncé sports in her video for "Hold Up" (2016). In one scene, Lorde shoots a pair of coconuts from a palm tree with a shotgun, which drew comparisons to Lana Del Rey's "High by the Beach" (2015) video where Del Rey shoots down a helicopter. Another shot, showing Lorde swinging from a giant tree swing draped with hanging moss, is a reference to her cover of The Replacements' "Swingin Party" (1985) on the Tennis Court EP (2013). During the video, Lorde also sits outside on a balcony and serves herself tea, which was compared to Lady Gaga's "Paparazzi" (2009) video.

=== Synopsis ===
In this scene, Lorde sits on a chaise longue chair, overlooking a balcony as she serves herself a cup of tea. It was compared to Lady Gaga's "Paparazzi" video.

The video begins with Lorde, dressed in a Jacquemus hat and white shirtdress, walking toward a field of tall grass with a machete. She walks through a gate that automatically opens overlooking a clear blue ocean and lays her shoulder next to one of the gate's sides while the artist's name and song title appear in retro orange letters. As the song opens, Lorde stands alone on a sandy beach wearing a red silk kimono coat. The next scene shows her walking near the beach in a silk Vaquera robe-gown at dusk. Lorde is then shown swaying from a giant moss swing, dressed in a white tulle dress, suspended from a tree limb. When the chorus begins, she is seen in different shots dancing wildly, running across a coastline, followed by her nearly submerging herself in a small pond near a waterfall.

The next scene shows Lorde, in an embellished red dress, a headpiece, and a black fishnet veil, alone in a restaurant filled with empty champagne glasses and an array of plants and flowers around her. She lays down on an outdoor chaise longue, dressed in a bejeweled nude dress, while pouring herself a cup of tea. Lorde appears alone in a boat, wearing a yellow Shrimpton Couture caftan dress and a hat as it floats off in the distance; critics compared this scene to paintings by French artist Pierre-Auguste Renoir. In the next scene, she shoots a coconut from a palm tree with a shotgun and hits a lightbulb to the rhythm of the song. Continuing in a similar way, the rest of the video features several scenes shown before and ends with Lorde singing into a lightbulb and then leaving.

=== Reception and analysis ===
The music video was well received by critics, with many commending its scenery. Cosmopolitan compared the coconut scene to Betty Draper from Mad Men (2007–2015). Arielle Tschinkel from Idolator called the video "visually stunning", adding that it places Lorde as the "focus with scenes out of a postcard as her backdrop." Uproxx editor Derrick Rossignol expressed that the video was "beautiful", noting that the "dynamic and anthemic pop track" perfectly scores the moments of "diverse aesthetic wonder in a way that both the song and visual deserve." Abraham Martinez from i-D expressed that the visual was a "theatrical tour de force with nature's elements as Lorde's only co-stars."

The video was also analysed by several publications who noted an evolution in Lorde's approach to fashion. The Cut revealed that several of the outfits worn in the video belonged to the Jacquemus, Vaquera and Zandra Rhodes' Shrimpton Couture collection. Melissa Minton from W magazine noted that the singer marked a transition from her darker fashion clothing and dark lips to a "more refined, sexy, glam look that's a bit more tame but just as witchy (and bewitching)." Vogue editor Daise Bodella noted that Lorde's decision to "spotlight young, rising designers certainly points the star in a more fashion-forward direction." She concludes by saying that the singer's style "shows a young woman who has comfortably come into her own."

== Live performances ==
Lorde performed the song on The Tonight Show Starring Jimmy Fallon on 16 June 2017, on the day of the album's release. She was dressed in "an oversized white suit" with a halo of flowers taped to her back; critics compared it to the outfit worn by David Byrne in Talking Heads' 1984 concert film, Stop Making Sense. Rolling Stone editor Ryan Reed praised Lorde's band for "nailing the song from the verse's stark piano to the chorus' 3-D blast of synth and arena-sized drum." Ben Kaye from Consequence of Sound called the performance "powerful" stating that she proved to be as "passionate on late night television as she is on stage".

She also closed out the Much Music Video Awards on 18 June 2017 by singing "Perfect Places", along with "Green Light". She wore a red tracksuit and crop top, singing with a choir of "tracksuited kids" while fireworks exploded above her. Stereogum writer Tom Breihan stated that her performance was "enormously fun to watch, with her skeleton rap hands and her theatrical intensity". Geena Kloeppel from Spin described Lorde as having a "fiery vision on stage". She also performed on Late Night with Seth Meyers on 17 July 2017. Lorde opted to perform a stripped-down version of the track and then dance liberally, which Rolling Stone's Elias Leight said added a "forlorn sensibility to the song, complimenting the lyrics in a literal way". Spin writer Anna Gaca called it a "great rendition", noting the "choir of young people wearing matching monogrammed Melodrama tracksuits" in the background, which helped elevate the song.

The track was included in the set lists for the Melodrama (2017-18), Solar Power (2022-23), and Ultrasound (2025-26) concert tours.

== Credits and personnel ==
Credits adapted from the liner notes of Melodrama.

Recording and management

- Recorded at Conway Recording Studios and Westlake Recording Studios (Los Angeles, California), and Electric Lady Studios (New York City)
- Mixed at Mixstar Studios (Virginia)
- Mastered at Sterling Sound Studios (New York City)
- Published by Songs Music Publishing, Sony/ATV Songs LLC, and Ducky Donath Music (BMI)

Personnel

- Lorde – lead vocals, songwriting, production
- Jack Antonoff – songwriting, production
- Andrew Wyatt – production
- Greg Eliason – assistant engineer
- Eric Eylands – assistant engineer
- Frank Dukes – additional production
- Serban Ghenea – mixing
- John Hanes – engineered for mix
- Barry McCready – assistant engineer
- Randy Merrill – mastering
- Seth Paris – assistant engineer
- Ben Sedano – assistant engineer
- Laura Sisk – engineering

== Charts ==
Weekly chart performance for "Perfect Places"
Chart (2017)	Peak position
Australia (ARIA)	44
Belgium (Ultratip Bubbling Under Flanders)	23
Belgium (Ultratip Bubbling Under Wallonia)	10
Canada Hot 100 (Billboard)	76
Croatia (HRT)	64
Czech Republic Singles Digital (ČNS IFPI)	83
Denmark Airplay (Tracklisten)	9
Ireland (IRMA)	91
New Zealand (Recorded Music NZ)	11
Slovakia Singles Digital (ČNS IFPI)	76
UK Singles (Official Charts)	95
US Bubbling Under Hot 100 (Billboard)	13
US Rock & Alternative Airplay (Billboard)	24

== Certifications ==
Certifications and sales for "Perfect Places"
Region	Certification	Certified units/sales
Australia (ARIA)	2× Platinum	140,000^{‡}
Brazil (Pro-Música Brasil)	Platinum	60,000^{‡}
Canada (Music Canada)	Platinum	80,000^{‡}
New Zealand (RMNZ)	2× Platinum	60,000^{‡}
United Kingdom (BPI)	Silver	200,000^{‡}
United States (RIAA)	Platinum	1,000,000^{‡}
^{‡} Sales+streaming figures based on certification alone.

== Release history ==
Release dates and formats for "Perfect Places"
Region	Date	Format	Label	Catalogue no.	Ref.
United Kingdom	1 June 2017	Digital download	Virgin	None	
United States	1 June 2017	Streaming	Universal Music New Zealand	B06XHPQBRQ	
Germany	2 June 2017	Streaming	Universal Music New Zealand	B06XHR7W73	
United States	6 June 2017	Alternative radio	Virgin	None	
Various	16 June 2017	Digital download	Universal Music New Zealand	None	
Italy	16 June 2017	Contemporary hit radio	Universal	None	
