= Liability (song) =

2017 promotional single by Lorde

Promotional single by Lorde

from the album Melodrama
- Released: 10 March 2017
- Studio: Electric Lady (New York); Rough Customer (Brooklyn Heights); Conway (Los Angeles)
- Genre: Pop
- Length: 2:54
- Label: Lava; Republic
- Songwriters: Ella Yelich-O'Connor; Jack Antonoff
- Producers: Lorde; Antonoff

Audio video
- "Liability" on YouTube

"Liability" is a song recorded by New Zealand singer-songwriter Lorde, from her second studio album Melodrama (2017). Lorde co-wrote and co-produced the track with Jack Antonoff. It was released on 10 March 2017, by Lava and Republic Records as the album's first promotional single. It is a pop piano ballad, which is accompanied with organs and guitar strums in the background. The track's lyrics detail the consequences and scrutiny Lorde's friends received from the media as a result of her new-found fame and the effect it had on her emotional health.

Music critics praised the song's lyrical content and Lorde's vocal delivery; some noted its dramatic sonic shift from the album's lead single "Green Light" (2017), which was released a week prior. The song had minor chart placements in the United States and the United Kingdom, placing at 78 and 84, respectively. She performed "Liability" for the first time on Saturday Night Live in New York in 2017 and subsequently at the Coachella Valley Music and Arts Festival in California. It was part of the set list of her Melodrama World Tour (2017–2018). Swedish singer Tove Styrke released a cover of the song titled "Liability (Demo)" to streaming services on 14 December 2017.

== Background and development ==
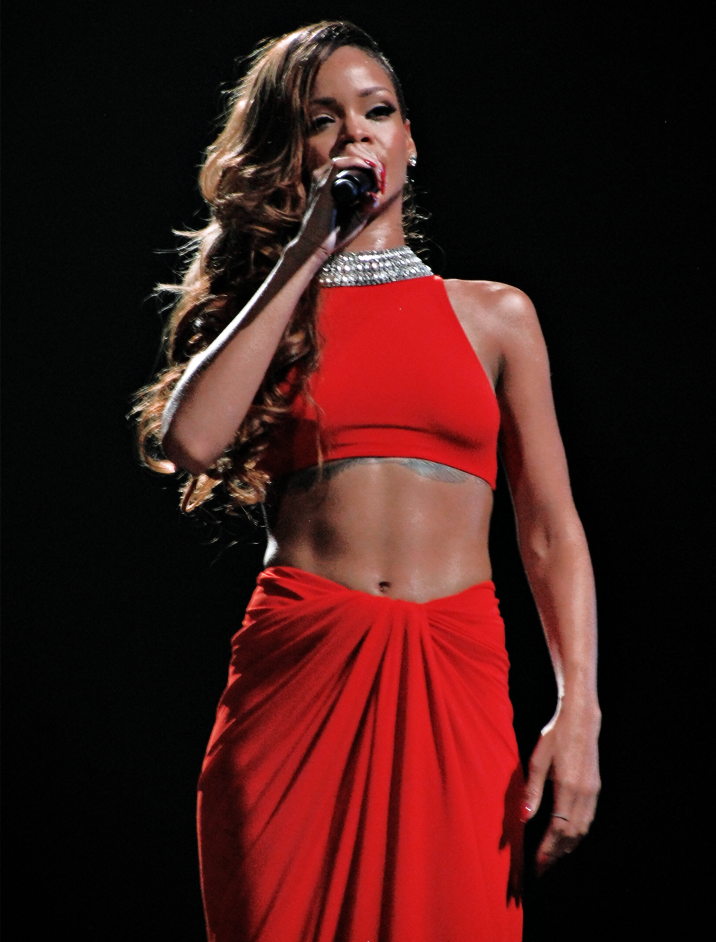
Lorde credits Rihanna's 2016 song "Higher" as inspiration for writing "Liability".

Lorde told a crowd at a secret iHeartRadio concert she held in Los Angeles in August 2017 that "Liability" was inspired by a night she became "overcome with anger and emotion". She walked 8 to 10 km (5.0 to 6.2 mi) before ordering an Uber to take her home. She cried as she listened to Rihanna's song "Higher" from her 2016 album Anti because of a feeling of "being 'too much' for somebody." Self-proclaimed as her first ballad, Lorde described the songwriting process of "Liability" as "therapeutic" as she felt that she said everything about herself that could hurt her "coming from other people".

Lorde said the original concept for "Liability" was a rap skit. She wanted to find a "fancy sound designer" to put the listener in a party. In there, she wanted to evoke the feeling of her walking away from said party down a hall, find a room, shut the door and then deliver a verse and chorus of the song. She also intended to have dialogue within "Liability", with someone calling her name and Lorde walking out of the room as the listener stays inside waiting for the next song to play. She contemplated changing the framing of the track but refrained from doing so. The singer said a note that was "deliberately missing" from the track was meant to feel like taking a breath or as if one would skip a step downstairs. She spent a couple of days in Waiheke Island to write the song.

== Recording and composition ==
Lorde recorded "Liability" in three different locations across the United States. She started recording the song at Electric Lady Studios, in New York, with Jack Antonoff and assistance from Barry McCready and Eric Eylands in engineering. Lorde and Antonoff both worked at Rough Customer Studio, in Brooklyn Heights, New York, a joint publishing venture between Sony/ATV and Antonoff. Recording concluded at Conway Recording Studios, in Los Angeles, California. Tom Elmhirst mixed the song at Electric Lady Studios, with assistance from Brandon Bost and Joe Visciano. Laura Sisk served as the sound engineer. It was published under the licenses of Songs Music Publishing, Sony/ATV Songs LLC, and Ducky Donath Music (BMI).

According to the sheet music published at Musicnotes.com, "Liability" is composed in the key of D-flat major and in the common time signature. The song moves at a moderately slow tempo of 72 beats per minute, and Lorde's vocals span a range of C_{3}–A♭_{4}. It is described by critics as a pop piano ballad, with guitar strums and organs in the background. Pitchfork editor Quinn Moreland noted an "unidentified mumbling male voice" at the start of the track. Patrick D. McDermott from The Fader compared "Liability" to the works of American indie rock band Bright Eyes. Time called it a "stripped-down" track, with a haunting piano melody that accompanies the singer's voice, which was labelled as husky. Its lyrics reveal the consequences of Lorde's rise to fame, in the lines, "The truth is, I am a toy that people enjoy 'til all of the tricks don't work anymore / And then they are bored of me."

== Reception ==
"Liability" received critical acclaim from music critics, with many commending the song's lyrical content and Lorde's vocal delivery, and was called one of the standout tracks on the record. Jon Blistein of Rolling Stone described the song as a "short but poignant song that finds Lorde grappling with fame and how it can change friendships and relationships." Billboard writer Andrew Unterberger commended its lyrics and Lorde's delivery, calling the song "an absolute jaw-dropper." Spin editor Anna Gaca praised Lorde for turning the track into a "poetic meditation on the perils of intimacy". Pitchfork expressed that the song was a "powerful counterpart to "Green Light" that shows how intensely Lorde peers into herself on her second record."

The song was released with the pre-order of Melodrama on digital download sites. In the United States, "Liability" debuted at number 78 on the Billboard Hot 100. It charted on the Digital Song Sales chart at number 27 (27,000 first-week downloads sold in the week ending March 16), while accruing 4.7 million U.S. streams. The song had minor chart placements in the United Kingdom and France, debuting at number 84 and 54, respectively. "Liability" debuted at number eight in New Zealand, earning Lorde her ninth top 10 entry in her native country. Elsewhere, the song debuted within the mid-tier in Australia and Canada, placing at number 42 and 62, respectively. It has received certifications in Australia (2× Platinum), Canada (2× Platinum), New Zealand (2× Platinum), and the United Kingdom (Gold). The song was ranked the 81st most popular song of 2017 by Australian alternative music station Triple J.

== Live performances and other usage ==
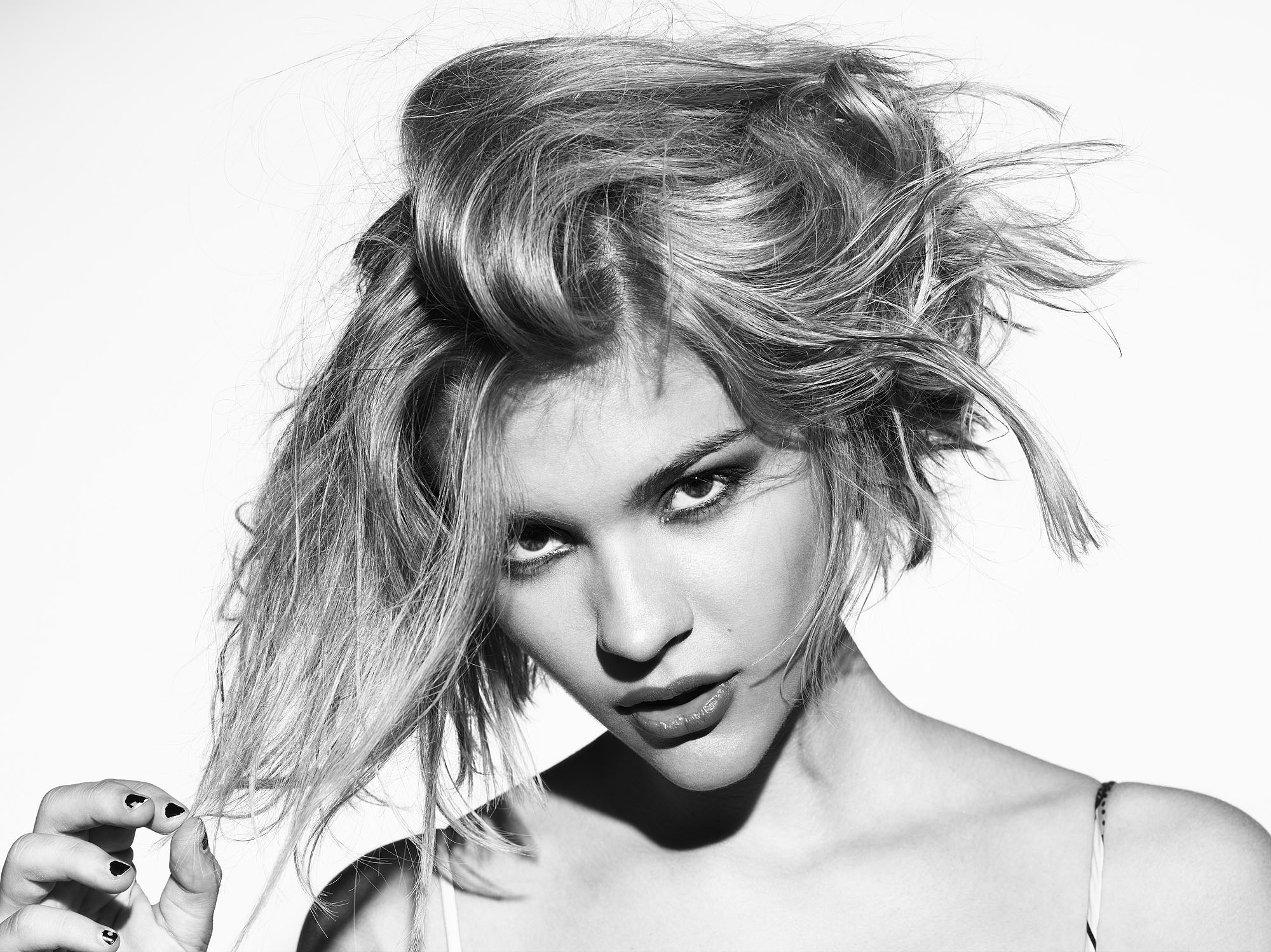
Tove Styrke released a "heavy electro-pop" version of the song, titled "Liability (Demo)".

Lorde performed "Liability" for the first time on Saturday Night Live in 2017. She sang the song with Antonoff, next to a piano while wearing a white bridal veil. Both Lorde and Antonoff brought several pieces to place on the piano to feel like when they initially wrote the song; these included a set of candles, a copy of Lorrie Moore's short story collection Self-Help (1985) and a framed picture of Swedish singer Robyn. Rolling Stone called it a "sparse, understated rendition." In a review for the episode, Chris White from Paste praised Lorde's performance, stating that the singer may be "remembered as the best musical performance" of the show's season. Vish Khanna from Exclaim described the performance as "artfully shot," with a piano accompaniment from Antonoff to back a "raw, emotional vocal" which was compared to American musicians Patti Smith and Paul Westerberg.

"Liability" was also performed at the 2017 edition of the Glastonbury Festival in England. Lorde confessed to the crowd that the song's inspiration came from the "bottomless pit of misery that comes from knowing you're a massive loser." The Telegraph called it a "beautiful confession" and one that "demonstrated the purity of her flawless vocals." She also performed the track at the ARIA Music Awards while sitting alone in a dim corner with lights peeking through a "wall of blinds." Lorde performed the song at the 2017 Coachella festival in "a glass box." Before she introduced the song, she briefly sang Kanye West's single "Runaway" (2010). Tove Styrke, an opening act on Lorde's Melodrama World Tour, released a demo of the track on streaming services on 14 December 2017. It was well received by critics who commended its "bouncy pop" twist. Styrke released a music video of her cover, filmed in a "deserted studio, decorated with fluorescent lights, [and Styrke] sprawled across the ground." Lorde's version is heard at the end of the Quantico episode "Global Reach". It was also featured in "Fuck Anyone Who's Not a Sea Blob", a special episode of HBO's original series, Euphoria.

== Credits and personnel ==
Credits adapted from the liner notes of Melodrama.

Recording and management

- Recorded at Conway Recording Studios, Rough Customer Studios (Brooklyn Heights, New York), and Electric Lady Studios (New York City)
- Mixed at Electric Lady Studios (New York City)
- Mastered at Sterling Sound Studios (New York City)
- Published by Songs Music Publishing, Sony/ATV Songs LLC, and Ducky Donath Music (BMI)

Personnel

- Lorde – lead vocals, songwriting, production
- Jack Antonoff – songwriting, production
- Barry McCready – assistant engineer
- Eric Eylands – assistant engineer
- Tom Elmhirst – mixing
- Joe Visciano – assistant mixing
- Brandon Bost – assistant mixing
- Tom Coyne – mastering
- Laura Sisk – engineering

== Charts ==
| Chart (2017) | Peak position |
|---|---|
| Australia (ARIA) | 42 |
| Canada Hot 100 (Billboard) | 62 |
| Czech Republic Singles Digital (ČNS IFPI) | 79 |
| France (SNEP) | 54 |
| Ireland (IRMA) | 74 |
| New Zealand (Recorded Music NZ) | 8 |
| Russia Airplay (Tophit) | 333 |
| Scottish Singles Sales (Official Charts) | 52 |
| Slovakia Singles Digital (ČNS IFPI) | 89 |
| Switzerland (Schweizer Hitparade) | 86 |
| UK Singles (Official Charts) | 84 |
| US Billboard Hot 100 | 78 |

== Certifications ==
| Region | Certification | Certified units/sales |
|---|---|---|
| Australia (ARIA) | 2× Platinum | 140,000^{‡} |
| Brazil (Pro-Música Brasil) | Gold | 30,000^{‡} |
| Canada (Music Canada) | 2× Platinum | 160,000^{‡} |
| New Zealand (RMNZ) | 2× Platinum | 60,000^{‡} |
| Portugal (AFP) | Gold | 5,000^{‡} |
| United Kingdom (BPI) | Gold | 400,000^{‡} |
| United States (RIAA) | Platinum | 1,000,000^{‡} |
^{‡} Sales+streaming figures based on certification alone.
