= Royals (song) =

2013 debut single by Lorde

Single by Lorde

from the EP The Love Club EP and the album Pure Heroine
- B-side: "400 Lux"; "Bravado"; "Tennis Court"
- Released: 3 June 2013
- Studio: Golden Age (Auckland)
- Genre: Art pop; electropop; alternative pop
- Length: 3:10
- Label: Universal
- Songwriters: Ella Yelich-O'Connor; Joel Little
- Producer: Joel Little

Lorde singles chronology
"Royals" (2013)	"Tennis Court" (2013)

Music video
- "Royals" on YouTube

"Royals" is the debut single by New Zealand singer-songwriter Lorde, included in her debut extended play (EP) The Love Club EP (2012) and debut studio album Pure Heroine (2013). Lorde wrote the song with producer Joel Little. "Royals" is a minimalist art pop and electropop song with influences of hip hop, R&B, and indie pop. The track's lyrics critique the sumptuous lifestyle presented in songs and music videos by popular musicians, making them appear like modern-day royalty.

"Royals" received widespread acclaim from music critics, who praised its songwriting, production, and Lorde's vocal performance. Since its release, the track has appeared on critics' year-end and decade-end listicles. The single attained international chart success, reaching number one in Canada, New Zealand, the United Kingdom, and the United States, where it spent nine weeks atop the Billboard Hot 100 and was certified Diamond by the Recording Industry Association of America (RIAA), making it one of the best-selling singles of all time. In the media, the song has been credited for inspiring some artists to adopt its minimalist sound and has been called an anthem for millennials.

The music video for "Royals" was directed by Joel Kefali and premiered on Lorde's YouTube channel on 12 May 2013. It shows teenagers in a suburban neighbourhood interspersed with minimal shots of Lorde. The track won awards for Song of the Year and Best Pop Solo Performance at the 2014 Grammy Awards, and the APRA Silver Scroll Award. Lorde performed "Royals" on her Pure Heroine (2013–14), Melodrama (2017–18), Solar Power (2022–23) and Ultrasound (2025-26) concert tours. Critics have credited the song for paving the way for other alternative-leaning pop artists. Rolling Stone listed "Royals" in their 2020 revision of the 500 Greatest Songs of All Time list.

== Background and writing ==
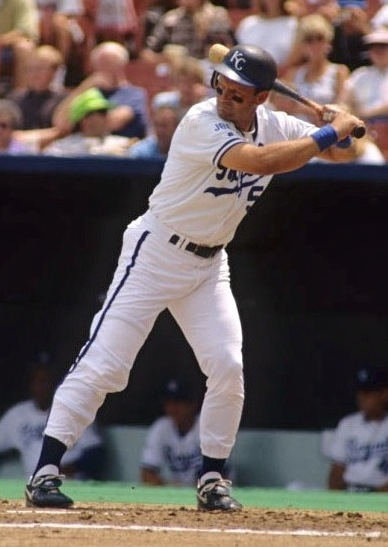
George Brett (pictured) playing for the KC Royals. A photograph of the American baseball player signing baseballs in the July 1976 edition of National Geographic inspired the track's title.

In 2009, A&R representative Scott MacLachlan of Universal Music Group (UMG) discovered 12-year-old singer Lorde when he saw footage of her performing at a school talent show in Auckland, New Zealand. At age 13, Lorde began writing songs. In December 2011, after several unsuccessful sessions with songwriters and producers, MacLachlan paired Lorde with Joel Little, a former singer and guitarist of the New Zealand pop-punk band Goodnight Nurse. Her vocal performance and songwriting abilities impressed Little, who composed songs with musical structures that were based on her lyrics.

Lorde wrote the lyrics to "Royals" in half an hour at her home in July 2012 and during a school break, she and Little recorded the song at Golden Age Studios in Auckland in one week. The 15-year-old artist pulled inspiration from a 1976 National Geographic photo and an old diary line. Lorde and Little wrote songs for the extended play (EP) The Love Club EP in three weeks. The title "Royals" came to Lorde after she saw a 1976 photograph of Kansas City Royals baseball player George Brett signing baseballs with his team's name "Royals" emblazoned on his shirt. She said during a VH1 interview in September 2013, "It was just that word. It's really cool."

Lorde's interest in aristocracy and monarchs such as Marie Antoinette and Henry VIII also inspired the song and her stage name. She said the lyric about driving Cadillacs in dreams came from a diary entry she wrote when she was 12. She also stated she took inspiration from pop and hip hop-influenced artists such as ASAP Rocky, Drake, Lana Del Rey, Nicki Minaj, Kanye West, and Jay-Z—particularly West's and Jay-Z's 2011 collaborative album Watch the Throne. During the songwriting process, she criticised their references to extravagant alcohol and cars, which did not represent her reality.

== Release ==
Lorde self-released "Royals" for free download in conjunction with The Love Club EP on SoundCloud on 22 November 2012. She released the EP for no cost because people her age are less likely to have access to a credit card. The song garnered an immediate reaction on social media and that December, "Royals" had its first radio broadcast on New Zealand radio station George FM. On 8 March 2013, UMG removed "Royals" from SoundCloud and released it to online stores in New Zealand and Australia. Lava and Republic Records released it to US radio on 3 June 2013.

According to Jason Flom, president of Lava Records, a key step to popularising "Royals" internationally was its addition to a Spotify playlist curated by American entrepreneur Sean Parker on 2 April 2013. The song later debuted on Spotify's Viral Chart, which lists the most popular songs among the service's users. "Royals" peaked at number one in May 2013. Two months later, the song was sent to alternative radio stations in the United States and on 13 August 2013, it was sent to contemporary hit radio stations. On September 3, 2013, “Royals” was released to rhythmic contemporary radio in the US. In other regions, "Royals" was made available in August 2013, and in the United Kingdom it was released on 20 October 2013.

"Royals" was also promoted through remixes released in partnership with artists The Weeknd, Rick Ross, Wale, and T-Pain. The latter's remix received criticism for making changes to the lyrics, and according to MTV, turning the "original's anti-bling sentiments into a celebration of the extravagant life".

== Composition and lyrical interpretation ==
"Royals" is as an art pop, electropop, and alternative pop song that incorporates elements of electronic music, and draws influence from R&B and indie pop. Its instrumentation consists of finger snaps, bass, percussion, and a hip hop beat. The track's low-fidelity production is enhanced by synthesisers and Pro Tools software. Its synth-influenced sound was compared to Purity Ring and Noah "40" Shebib.

It is written in the key of G major (in the D Mixolydian mode), with a moderate tempo of 85 beats per minute (Andante). Lorde's vocals were compared to those of Amy Winehouse, Lana Del Rey, and Florence Welch. The National Public Radio's Ann Powers said Lorde's sultry voice, "intriguingly sleepy beats and lyrics ... captured the exquisite ennui of a precocious teenager". On the song, Lorde performs with a mezzo-soprano vocal range, spanning F♯_{3} to F♯_{5}.

Foreign Policy's Alicia P.Q. Wittmeyer noted "Royals" as an observation of conspicuous consumption. The song expresses Lorde's displeasure at the sumptuous lifestyle presented by some pop artists in their songs. She criticises consumerism and ridicules the luxury items mentioned in popular hip hop songs. Other analysts noted themes of income inequality, and "unabashedly pop [songs] attacking unabashedly pop music". Chris Coplan of Consequence of Sound described the lyrics of "Royals" as "romantic and playful" while Duncan Greive of The Guardian called them "simultaneously vulnerable and imperious".

Matthew Perpetua of BuzzFeed said the issue addressed in "Royals" is growing up in New Zealand "immersed in American cultural imperialism" and that the song's core is the alienation of social classes. Sharing similar sentiments, Jon Pareles and Michael M. Grynbaum of The New York Times noted the track's verses describe "growing up in drab reality amid a popular culture that flaunts luxury brands and celebrates wildly conspicuous consumption". Jonah Bromwich of The Village Voice said "Royals" has the "potential to sound like a celebration of the very things" Lorde is criticising. Lorde said the song is about the opulence one finds in some music videos, which is "far from [her] reality".

== Reception ==
=== Critical response ===
"Royals" received widespread acclaim from music critics. Lewis Corner from Digital Spy awarded the track a five rating and lauded its "addictive hook that thrives on its simplicity". The Guardian's Duncan Grieve was impressed by the song's "direct response" to excess and wealth. The Boston Globe writer James Reed selected "Royals" as the highlight of the album Pure Heroine. Rita Houston of NPR praised its melody, "heartfelt" songwriting, and Lorde's "rhythmic" vocals that combine to create a "polished little gem of a song". Jon Hadusek from Consequence of Sound also named the track the album's standout, singling out its "self-reflexive" lyrics and "catchy" production. PopMatters writer Scott Interrante felt that the song's sound was "distinct and fresh", while The New York Times's Jon Pareles highlighted its clever message, describing it as a "class-conscious critique of pop-culture materialism".

The lyrical content of the song was scrutinised after Feministing blogger Véronica Bayetti Flores called it "racist". She felt that "gold teeth, Cristal, and Maybachs" were direct references to items used by mainstream black artists. This prompted responses from several media publications, including The Washington Times, Complex, and Vice, who disagreed with Flores's comments. Journalist Lynda Brendish wrote that the song also critiques other stereotypes associated with affluent, high-profile personalities, such as rock musicians, socialites, and Russian oligarchs. In contrast, Spin writer Brandon Soderberg argued that the inclusion of "Royals" on urban radio was an attempt by the music industry to whitewash traditionally black radio stations.

=== Accolades ===
"Royals" appeared on several year-end song lists. Many media sources, including Slant, The Boston Herald, and Consequence of Sound named it the best song of 2013. Rolling Stone and The Guardian included "Royals" as the runner-up on their year-end lists. Billboard, NME, The Huffington Post, and Time included the song in the top ten of their end-of-year lists. The Village Voice's Pazz & Jop annual critics' poll to find the best music of 2013 ranked "Royals" at number two after Daft Punk's "Get Lucky" (2013). Listeners' votes placed the song in second place on Australian radio station Triple J's Hottest 100 of 2013, after Vance Joy's "Riptide" (2013).

On 15 October 2013, co-writers Lorde and Joel Little won the APRA Silver Scroll award, which honours original New Zealand songwriting. At the 56th Annual Grammy Awards, "Royals" won Song of the Year and Best Pop Solo Performance and was nominated for Record of the Year. Lorde was the youngest New Zealander to win a Grammy and the third-youngest performer overall. "Royals" also won Single of the Year at the 2013 New Zealand Music Awards, and the Most Performed Songs distinction at the ASCAP Pop Awards. It received a nomination for Song of the Year at the BBC Music Awards and Best Track at the Q Awards.

== Chart performance ==
=== North America ===
In its first seven days on sale, "Royals" sold 85,000 downloads and debuted at number 90 on the Billboard Hot 100 for the week ending 20 July 2013. In a later interview, Lorde said, "I had a sneaking suspicion that it might do all right". On 31 August, "Royals" rose to number 17 on the Hot 100, becoming Lorde's first top-20 song in the US. With sales of 307,000 copies (up 17%), "Royals" became the fourth release by an up-and-coming singer to reach the top of the Digital Songs chart. The song had the most digital downloads for five non-consecutive weeks.

On the 12 October chart, "Royals" replaced "Wrecking Ball" by Miley Cyrus, which had been at the top for two straight weeks, as the number-one song in the US. Aly Weisman of Business Insider noted Lorde's performance of the song on Late Night with Jimmy Fallon helped make it known to a wider audience. The song's rise to number one was attributed to 294,000 downloads made that week, 6.1 million streamings (up 12%), and an airplay audience of 128 million (up 22%) across all genres, earning Lorde the highest airplay gainer for the week. The song topped the chart for nine consecutive weeks and was the year's top-selling song by a female artist. "Royals" was certified fourteen-times Platinum in 2023 for selling over 14 million copies in the US.

Since its release in the US, "Royals" has broken multiple records, many of them a result of Lorde's young age. At 16 years and 11 months old, Lorde became the youngest female artist in 26 years to top the Billboard Hot 100 since 16-year-old Tiffany topped the chart with "I Think We're Alone Now" in 1987. It also made Lorde the first New Zealand act to top the Billboard Hot 100 as a lead artist and the youngest musician to top the chart with a song written by the performer, surpassing Soulja Boy, who achieved this at age 17 with "Crank That (Soulja Boy)" in 2007. Lorde became the youngest artist whose song stayed at number one for more than eight weeks, a feat that was previously achieved by 13-year-old hip-hop duo Kris Kross with "Jump" in 1992. It also made Lorde the youngest solo artist to top the chart since Mario who, at 18 years old, topped the chart with "Let Me Love You" in 2005.

In August 2013, Lorde became the second ever solo female artist to top the Billboard Alternative Songs chart, since Tracy Bonham in 1996. "Royals" holds the record for longest spell at number one on the Billboard Alternative Songs chart by a woman, surpassing Alanis Morissette's "You Oughta Know" (1995), which spent five weeks at number one. The success of "Royals" has been credited to frequent airplay on stations playing different genres of music.

"Royals" debuted at number 58 on the Canadian Hot 100 and in the following weeks it steadily rose up the chart. In its 12th week, on the chart dated 12 October, the song hit number one after selling more than 29,000 copies. It remained there for six consecutive weeks. "Royals" returned to the top of the chart on the 23rd of that month, spending seven non-consecutive weeks at number one. Music Canada later awarded the song a diamond plaque, denoting sales of more than 800,000 copies.

=== Europe, Asia, and Oceania ===
The song debuted at number three on the Irish Recorded Music Association (IRMA) Chart on 3 October 2013, before peaking at number one the following week and selling a further 309,000 copies.

On 28 October, the Official Charts Company (OCC) confirmed "Royals" would enter the UK Singles Charts with sales of 82,551 units. The same day, the song debuted at number one on chart. Lorde became the youngest solo artist to score a UK number-one single since 15-year-old Billie Piper with her 1998 song "Because We Want To". "Royals" competed for the top spot with James Arthur's "You're Nobody 'til Somebody Loves You", taking it with a sales difference of 7,000 copies. "Royals" sold 82,551 units. Surprised by the news, Lorde commented; "I'm so incredibly excited to be in first place this week and very grateful to all fans in the UK who bought 'Royals'!" The single fell to number two in its second week, selling another 59,903 copies, and by April 2014 it had shipped more than 470,000 copies in the UK. In March 2025, it was awarded a triple platinum certificate by the British Phonographic Industry (BPI) for selling more than 1,800,000 copies in the country.

"Royals" also had commercial success elsewhere in Europe, reaching the top of the Euro Digital Songs chart and peaking within the top ten in European national charts including those of Germany, Denmark, Finland, and Hungary. In South Korea, "Royals" peaked at number 37 on the Gaon International Singles Chart with initial sales of 4,331 copies and in Japan, it peaked at number 16. On 15 March 2013, "Royals" debuted at number one on the New Zealand Top 40 and remained in the top position for three weeks.

In Australia, "Royals" was released simultaneously with The Love Club EP and was classified as a single for charting purposes. The EP spent two weeks at its peak position of number two on the ARIA Singles Chart, being kept from number one by Avicii's "Wake Me Up". The EP's sales were recorded as a whole and therefore tracks on the album could not chart separately. "Royals" was the fifth best-selling single of the year in Australia and it was accredited nonuple platinum by the Australian Recording Industry Association (ARIA) for selling more than 630,000 units. "Royals" was the most-streamed song in Australia and New Zealand by a female artist in 2013. By November 2014, "Royals" had sold over 10 million copies worldwide.

== Music video ==
According to Lorde, this scene is a picture of the "straight forward" life she grew up with, where she spent most of her time riding around on bikes and taking photos.

The accompanying music video for "Royals" was directed by Joel Kefali and was released on Lorde's YouTube channel on 12 May 2013. In an interview with The Huffington Post, Lorde said the video's concept was to show how teenage life can be "so mundane and so boring." Lorde told the same publication in a later interview she felt her presence in the video was unnecessary, saying; "With pop music and pop musicians, you know everything about everyone all the time, particularly their physical appearance. With female musicians that's made a big thing of and I think people, certainly with me, have appreciated a bit of mystery."

The video begins with a monochromatic scene of an unmade bed, which fades to a receding suburban neighbourhood. A teenage boy wearing a necklace takes a shower and a static-filled television screen is shown. The boy stares out of his bedroom window, lies on a couch, eats breakfast and cuts his hair. The same boy visits an indoor swimming complex and boxes with a friend in a living room. The boy stares at a mirror and pulls down his bloody lip to reveal an injury he sustained while boxing. Lorde is briefly shown singing part of the song. The boy waits with friends at a railway station. He rests his head against the train window with a dull expression on his face. In the final scene, the camera moves towards the suburban neighbourhood seen at the start of the video.

Since its release, the video has garnered over 900 million views. Slant placed the video at number three on their list of the best music videos of 2013, noting her absence from it "speaks to both the 16-year-old's 'postcode' shame and her friends' suburban-teen ennui". The video won the award for Best Rock Video at the 2014 MTV Video Music Awards. Critics were divided over its placement in the rock category. It received a nomination for Best Female Video in the MTV Awards ceremony but lost to Katy Perry's 2014 song "Dark Horse". "Royals" won best music video at the 2013 New Zealand Music Awards.

== Live performances ==
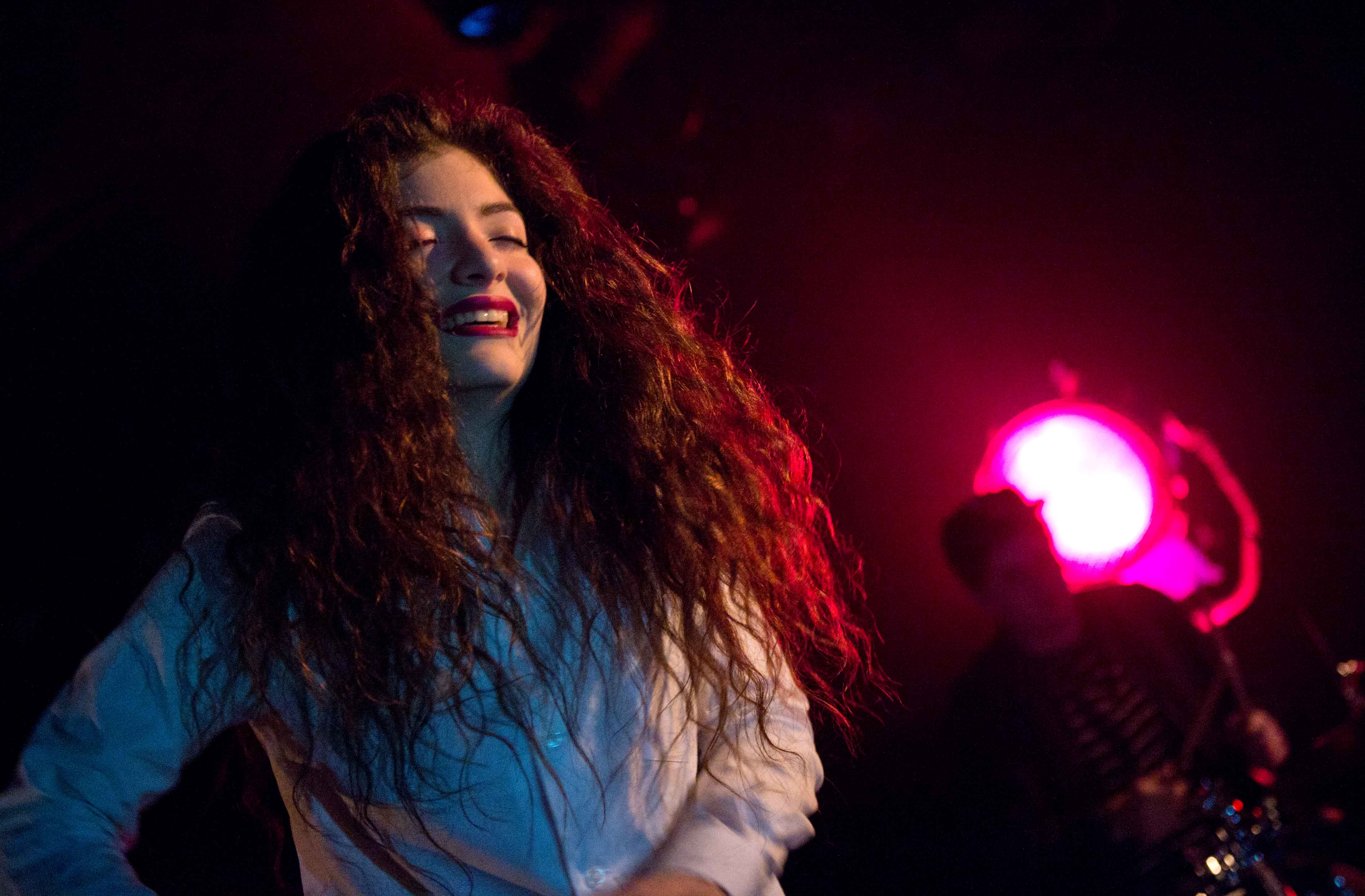
Lorde performing at the Decibel Festival in Seattle, September 2013

On 13 August 2013, Lorde recorded a live performance of "Royals" for KCRW's radio programme Morning Becomes Eclectic. In New Zealand, she made her stage debut at a small venue in Auckland for a small audience, and on 18 September 2013, she made her television debut on New Zealander 3rd Degree. Lorde made her UK television debut on the BBC programme Later... with Jools Holland.

Lorde, in her first US television appearance, sang "Royals" on Late Night with Jimmy Fallon on 1 October 2013 backed by a keyboardist and a drummer. Her performance was met with positive reviews. Three days later, she sang the song on the VH1 television show Big Morning Buzz Live. Lorde also performed "Royals" on The Ellen DeGeneres Show, at the opening of the 2013 New Zealand Music Awards, and along with "Buzzcut Season" on the Canadian radio show Q. Days later, Lorde appeared on the Late Show with David Letterman and introduced "Royals" and other tracks from Pure Heroine.

In early 2014, Lorde performed a reworked version of "Royals" at the 56th Annual Grammy Awards. Rolling Stone praised the performance, which included projections of statues behind her and made Lorde the most talked-about artist on social media during the ceremony. At the 2014 BRIT Awards, she performed an electro version of "Royals" with Disclosure, which segued into Disclosure's song "White Noise". The BRIT Awards released the "Royals/White Noise" performance at the iTunes Stores on 19 February 2014; proceeds from its sales went to the charity War Child. The BRIT Awards performance debuted at number 72 on the UK Singles Chart.

In April 2014, Lorde made her debut appearance in Brazil at the Lollapalooza festival and included "Royals" on her set list. The song was also added to the set list of the Pure Heroine Tour (2013–2014), the Melodrama World Tour (2017–2018), the Solar Power Tour (2022–2023), and the Ultrasound World Tour (2025-2026). In July 2015, Lorde performed the song with Taylor Swift on her 1989 World Tour in Washington, D.C., as one of many guests that Swift invited during the tour.

== Other cover versions and use in media ==
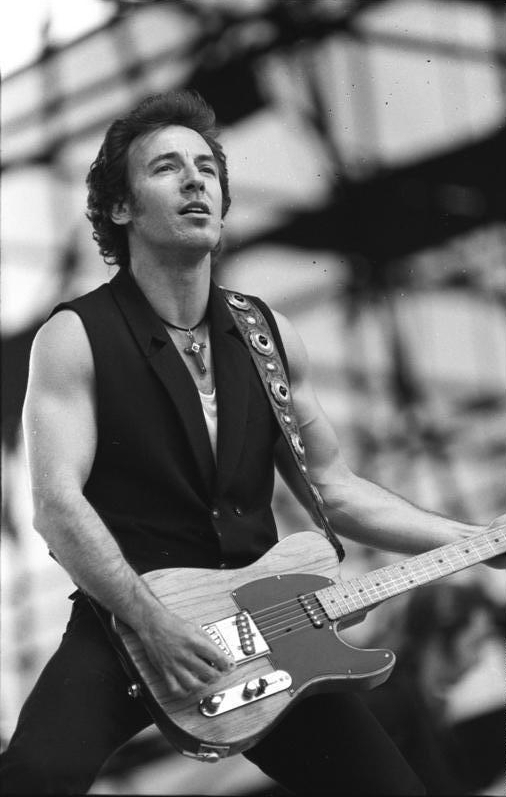
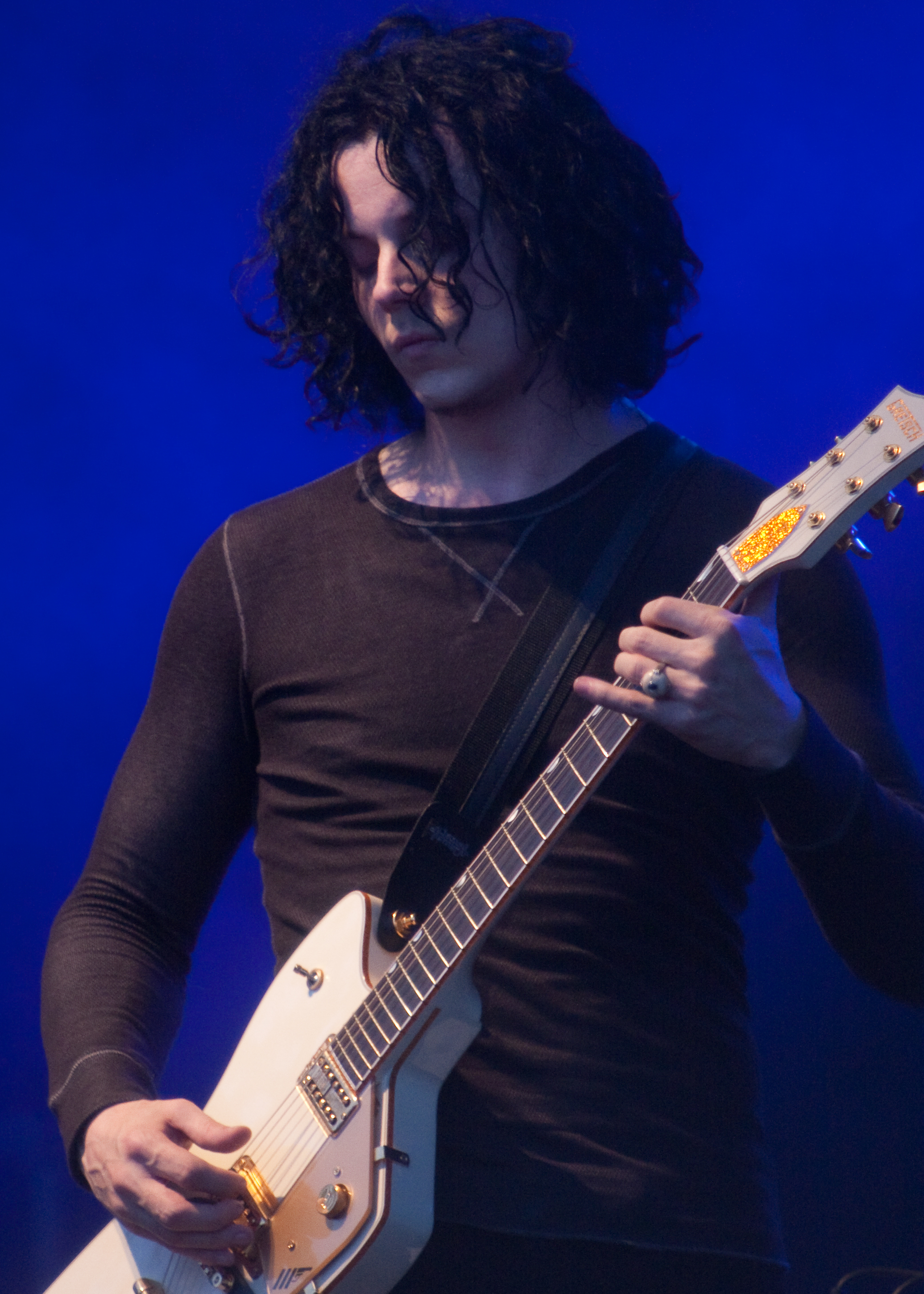
Bruce Springsteen and Jack White (from The White Stripes) were two of many musicians who covered "Royals".

Other artists have recorded and performed versions of "Royals". In August 2013, Selena Gomez performed the song during her Stars Dance Tour appearance in Vancouver, Canada. American singer Jason Derulo performed an R&B-style version of it on BBC Radio 1's Live Lounge in December 2013. Canadian singer-songwriter the Weeknd also recorded a remix version of the song.

Bruce Springsteen performed an acoustic cover of "Royals" in April 2014 in Auckland, New Zealand, during his High Hopes Tour. Lorde responded to it, commenting; "It's so exciting, it's a great honor, Springsteen is a fantastic songwriter, I was a little touched, it's really cool, it's crazy when someone like him is playing your song". American spoof-folk duo Black Simon & Garfunkel performed a cover of the song on The Tonight Show with Jimmy Fallon; Esquire considered the parody the best cover of the song by any artist. "Weird Al" Yankovic recorded a parody of the song titled "Foil" for his album Mandatory Fun. Its music video was released online on 16 July 2014. Capital FM described Yankovic's parody as "equally strange and brilliant". Novelty act Puddles Pity Party, played by singer Mike Geier, performed "Royals" for Halloween in 2013; Lorde called it her favourite cover of the song at the time.

New York City Mayor Bill de Blasio used "Royals" at his victory speech in Brooklyn in November 2013. According to The New York Times, the song was chosen because it deals with social class inequality, one of de Blasio's main campaign themes. Samsung used the track in a commercial for the Galaxy Note 3. The satirical CBC TV programme This Hour Has 22 Minutes used "Royals" as the basis of a parody about the Canadian Senate expenses scandal. In December 2013, Lorde's publishers takes down a parody video of "Royals" on YouTube by Bart Baker for alleged copyright infringement, with the media noting that Baker was freely allowed fair use through parody of the song.

"Royals" was used in the television series Suburgatory and Reign. In 2014, "Royals" was featured in the rhythm game Fantasia: Music Evolved. A remix of the song titled "Loyal" with new lyrics was performed by Demarco and was included in the re-released edition of Grand Theft Auto V. The song was also used in the 2019 crime film Hustlers. According to the Lorene Scafaria, the film's director, Lorde's reluctance to issue copyright of her music prompted Scafaria to write Lorde a letter about the song's meaning to her and its importance to the film; Lorde approved her request. It is the first song Lorde licensed for a film. "Royals" in a cover version of Alex Boye was played during the end credits of the 2017 American drama film The Pirates of Somalia written and directed by Bryan Buckley.

== Legacy ==
Analysts have credited "Royals" as a precedent for mainstream pop music's transition to minimalist, dark, pop sounds. Some sources have said it paved the way for other alternative-leaning pop artists such as Banks, Billie Eilish, Clairo, Halsey, Mallrat, and Olivia Rodrigo. Lindsay Zoladz from The Ringer noted the song's impact was "larger and harder to define because it completely rewrote the rules for young women making radio-friendly pop". Zach Schonfeld, writing for Newsweek, said "Royals" led "a trail of imitators mimicking the song's effortless pop minimalism". It was compared to Nirvana's 1991 single "Smells Like Teen Spirit" because both tracks were disruptive to music charts and "decried the pop industry of which it became a part". Vulture included "Royals" as one of the 103 moments that shaped the music of the 2010s.

Forbes writer Nick Messitte said the success of "Royals" helped the re-release of Tove Lo's 2013 song "Habits (Stay High)" become a top-five hit in the United States. According to Messitte, the song's success indicated "the smart money [would be] on change" to find a new sound in pop music. David Bowie called Lorde "the future of music" and Dave Grohl, lead singer of Foo Fighters, described "Royals" as revolutionary. Sir Elton John called it "beautiful in its simplicity", and told his children's godmother Lady Gaga that she should focus on going a similar direction. Geoff Nelson from Consequence of Sound noted the track became "perhaps, the single most influential pop single of the decade". Phil Whitmer of Vice stated "Royals" is "alien by contrast" to the "legions of songs that imitated its vibe [and] failed to copy its mixolydian feel". BBC listed "Royals" as a B-side on their list of the songs that defined the 2010s. Stephen Dowling of the publication highlighted how the track's minimalist production "created the blueprint for the 'cutting-edge' sound of pop", setting the foundation for Taylor Swift's 2014 album 1989.

NPR readers voted "Royals" the fourth most-popular song of the 2010s, while Pitchfork's readers poll placed it at number 34 on their decade list. The song placed at number 16 on Triple J's Hottest 100 of the Decade contest.

Critical rankings for "Royals"
Critic/Organization	Time span	Rank	Published year
Billboard	All Time (Pop songs)	111	2023
Billboard	Decade-end	*	2019
Billboard	21st century (Choruses)	34	2019
Cleveland	21st century (Pop songs)	11	2018
Cleveland	21st century	85	2019
Consequence	All Time (Debut singles)	6	2017
Consequence	Decade-end	4	2019
Consequence	Decade-end (Pop songs)	2	2019
Double J	All Time (Debut singles)	3	2021
Entertainment Weekly	Decade-end (Pop hooks)	5	2019
Entertainment Weekly	1990–2014	*	2015
Far Out	Decade-end	42	2022
NPR	21st century (Female artists)	6	2018
Insider	Decade-end	*	2019
Insider	All Time (Written by teenagers)	*	2019
NME	Decade-end	50	2019
Paste	Decade-end	36	2019
Pitchfork	Decade-end	129	2019
Rolling Stone	Decade-end	11	2019
Rolling Stone	21st century	9	2018
Rolling Stone	All Time (Debut singles)	29	2020
Rolling Stone	All Time	30	2021
Rolling Stone Italy	Decade-end	11	2019
Slant	Decade-end	3	2020
Stereogum	Decade-end	23	2019
Spin	1985–2020	34	2020
Tampa Bay Times	Decade-end (Pop songs)	11	2019
The Daily Telegraph	All Time	77	2018
The Times	Decade-end	*	2020
Time Out	All Time (Pop songs)	21	2023
Treble	Decade-end	64	2020
Vanity Fair	Decade-end	*	2019

== Track listings ==
Digital download
No.	Title	Length
1.	"Royals"	3:09
Total length:		3:09

New Zealand double download one
No.	Title	Length
1.	"Royals"	3:10
2.	"400 Lux"	3:54
Total length:		7:04

New Zealand double download two
No.	Title	Length
1.	"Royals"	3:10
2.	"Tennis Court"	3:18
Total length:		6:28

CD single
No.	Title	Length
1.	"Royals"	3:09
2.	"Bravado"	3:41
Total length:		6:50

BRITs performance digital download
No.	Title	Length
1.	"Royals/White Noise (Live from the BRITs)" (featuring AlunaGeorge)	4:59
Total length:		4:59

== Charts ==
=== Weekly charts ===
Weekly chart performance
Chart (2013–2014)	Peak position
Australia ARIA Digital Track Chart (ARIA)	2
Austria (Ö3 Austria Top 40)	2
Belgium (Ultratop 50 Flanders)	1
Belgium (Ultratop 50 Wallonia)	1
Brazil (Billboard Brasil Hot 100)	20
Brazil Hot Pop Songs (Billboard Brasil)	3
Canada Hot 100 (Billboard)	1
Canada AC (Billboard)	1
Canada CHR/Top 40 (Billboard)	1
Canada Hot AC (Billboard)	1
Canada Rock (Billboard)	9
Croatia International Airplay (Top lista)	1
Czech Republic Airplay (ČNS IFPI)	7
Czech Republic Singles Digital (ČNS IFPI)	20
Denmark (Tracklisten)	3
Euro Digital Song Sales (Billboard)	1
Finland (Suomen virallinen lista)	8
Finland Airplay (Radiosoittolista)	35
France (SNEP)	4
Germany (GfK)	8
Hungary (Rádiós Top 40)	32
Hungary (Single Top 40)	10
Iceland (RÚV)	2
Ireland (IRMA)	1
Ireland (IRMA) "Royals"/"White Noise" (Live from the BRITs)	93
Israel International Airplay (Media Forest)	1
Italy (FIMI)	1
Italy Airplay (EarOne)	1
Japan Hot 100 (Billboard)	16
Mexico Anglo (Monitor Latino)	11
Netherlands (Dutch Top 40)	4
Netherlands (Single Top 100)	4
New Zealand (Recorded Music NZ)	1
New Zealand Artists (Recorded Music NZ) "Royals"/"White Noise" (Live from the BRITs)	9
Norway (VG-lista)	3
Poland Airplay (ZPAV)	11
Romania (Airplay 100)	10
Scottish Singles Sales (Official Charts)	1
Slovakia (Rádio Top 100 Oficiálna)	4
Slovakia Singles Digital (ČNS IFPI)	61
Slovenia (SloTop50)	2
South Africa Airplay (EMA)	3
Spain (Promusicae)	1
Sweden (Sverigetopplistan)	1
Switzerland (Schweizer Hitparade)	3
UK Singles (Official Charts)	1
UK Singles (OCC) "Royals"/"White Noise" (Live from the BRITs)	72
US Billboard Hot 100	1
US Adult Contemporary (Billboard)	2
US Adult Pop Airplay (Billboard)	1
US Dance Club Songs (Billboard)	14
US Latin Pop Airplay (Billboard)	19
US Pop Airplay (Billboard)	1
US R&B/Hip-Hop Airplay (Billboard)	3
US Rhythmic Airplay (Billboard)	2
US Hot Rock & Alternative Songs (Billboard)	1
Venezuela Pop/Rock General (Record Report)	1

=== Year-end charts ===
Annual chart rankings
Chart (2013)	Position
Australia (ARIA)	5
Austria (Ö3 Austria Top 40)	46
Belgium (Ultratop 50 Flanders)	43
Belgium (Ultratop 50 Wallonia)	68
Canada (Canadian Hot 100)	18
Denmark (Tracklisten)	39
France (SNEP)	64
Germany (Media Control AG)	59
Italy (FIMI)	53
Italy Airplay (EarOne)	45
Netherlands (Dutch Top 40)	17
Netherlands (Single Top 100)	15
New Zealand (Recorded Music NZ)	2
Slovenia (SloTop50)	35
Spain Streaming (PROMUSICAE)	55
Sweden (Sverigetopplistan)	75
Switzerland (Schweizer Hitparade)	51
UK Singles (Official Charts Company)	44
US Billboard Hot 100	15
US Adult Top 40 (Billboard)	23
US Mainstream Top 40 (Billboard)	27
US Rhythmic (Billboard)	35
US Hot Rock Songs (Billboard)	3

Chart (2014)	Position
Australia (ARIA)	83
Belgium (Ultratop 50 Flanders)	69
Belgium (Ultratop 50 Wallonia)	40
Brazil (Crowley)	35
Canada (Canadian Hot 100)	35
France (SNEP)	43
Germany (Official German Charts)	98
Italy (FIMI)	64
Japan (Japan Hot 100)	92
Japan Adult Contemporary (Billboard)	23
Netherlands (Dutch Top 40)	83
Romania (Airplay 100)	46
Slovenia (SloTop50)	43
Spain Streaming (PROMUSICAE)	62
Sweden (Sverigetopplistan)	61
Switzerland (Schweizer Hitparade)	67
UK Singles (Official Charts Company)	98
US Billboard Hot 100	20
US Adult Contemporary (Billboard)	15
US Adult Top 40 (Billboard)	37
US Rhythmic (Billboard)	46
US Hot Rock Songs (Billboard)	3

=== Decade-end charts ===
Decennium chart rankings
Chart (2010–2019)	Position
US Billboard Hot 100	18
US Hot Rock Songs (Billboard)	15

=== All-time charts ===
All-time chart rankings
Chart	Position
US Billboard Hot 100	77
US Billboard Hot 100 (Women)	20
US Adult Alternative Airplay (Billboard)	43

== Certifications ==
Certifications and sales
Region	Certification	Certified units/sales
Australia (ARIA)	9× Platinum	630,000^{‡}
Austria (IFPI Austria)	2× Platinum	60,000^{*}
Belgium (BRMA)	Gold	15,000^{*}
Brazil (Pro-Música Brasil)	3× Diamond	750,000^{‡}
Canada (Music Canada)	Diamond	800,000^{‡}
France (SNEP)	Diamond	333,333^{‡}
Germany (BVMI)	3× Gold	450,000^{‡}
Italy (FIMI)	2× Platinum	60,000^{‡}
New Zealand (RMNZ)	7× Platinum	210,000^{‡}
Norway (IFPI Norway)	5× Platinum	50,000^{‡}
Spain (Promusicae)	Platinum	60,000^{‡}
Sweden (GLF)	4× Platinum	160,000^{‡}
Switzerland (IFPI Switzerland)	Gold	15,000^{^}
United Kingdom (BPI)	3× Platinum	1,800,000^{‡}
United States (RIAA)	15× Platinum	15,000,000^{‡}
Streaming
Denmark (IFPI Danmark)	Platinum	1,800,000^{†}
Summaries
Worldwide (IFPI)	—	22,000,000
^{*} Sales figures based on certification alone.^{^} Shipments figures based on certification alone.^{‡} Sales+streaming figures based on certification alone.^{†} Streaming-only figures based on certification alone.

== Release history ==
Street dates
Country	Date	Format	Label	Catalogue no.
United States	3 June 2013	Adult album alternative	Lava; Republic	None
Austria	2 August 2013	Digital download	Universal	None
Belgium	2 August 2013	Digital download	Universal	None
Denmark	2 August 2013	Digital download	Universal	None
Finland	2 August 2013	Digital download	Universal	None
Greece	2 August 2013	Digital download	Universal	None
Indonesia	2 August 2013	Digital download	Universal	None
Ireland	2 August 2013	Digital download	Universal	None
Japan	2 August 2013	Digital download	Universal	None
Norway	2 August 2013	Digital download	Universal	None
France	5 August 2013	Digital download	Universal	None
Italy	5 August 2013	Digital download	Universal	None
Luxembourg	5 August 2013	Digital download	Universal	None
Portugal	5 August 2013	Digital download	Universal	None
Singapore	5 August 2013	Digital download	Universal	None
Spain	5 August 2013	Digital download	Universal	None
United States	13 August 2013	Contemporary hit radio	Lava; Republic	None
United States	3 September 2013	Rhythmic contemporary	Lava; Republic	None
Germany	13 September 2013	Digital download	Universal	None
Italy	20 September 2013	Contemporary hit radio	Universal	None
United Kingdom	20 October 2013	Digital download	Virgin	
Germany	10 December 2013	CD single	Universal	0602537693191
Worldwide	19 February 2014	"Royals/White Noise" download	Brit Awards	
New Zealand	4 April 2014	"Royals" / "400 Lux" download	Universal	
New Zealand	4 April 2014	"Royals" / "Tennis Court" download	Universal	

== See also ==
- List of best-selling singles
- List of Billboard Hot 100 number-one singles of 2013
- List of Hot 100 number-one singles of 2013 (Canada)
- List of Mainstream Top 40 number-one hits of 2013 (U.S.)
- List of number-one singles of 2013 (Ireland)
- List of number-one singles from the 2010s (New Zealand)
- List of UK Singles Chart number ones of the 2010s
- List of number-one hits of 2013 (Italy)
- List of Ultratop 50 number-one singles of 2013
