= Pure Heroine Tour =

2013–2014 concert tour by Lorde

- Tour by Lorde
- Promotional poster for the Australian leg
- Associated album: Pure Heroine
- Start date: 28 July 2013
- End date: 1 November 2014
- No. of shows: 62 in North America; 24 in Oceania; 10 in Europe; 5 in South America; 2 in Asia; 103 Total

Lorde concert chronology
- Pure Heroine Tour (2013–2014); Melodrama World Tour (2017–2018)

The Pure Heroine Tour was the inaugural concert tour by New Zealand singer-songwriter Lorde, in support of her debut studio album, Pure Heroine (2013). Her first performance was at the Splendour in the Grass music festival as a last-minute replacement for Frank Ocean. Before the tour, Lorde performed at small nightclubs and bars around New Zealand and Australia. North American shows were announced in August 2013, followed by a series of dates in Oceania. Dates in Europe and South America soon followed.

The show consisted of three segments and three costume changes. With the exception of a couple of covers, the set list included only songs from her debut album. Typically, Lorde appeared on stage hidden from the crowd, visible only in silhouette. She also premiered an unreleased song called "Good Fights". An alternate set list with minor changes was performed after the first North American leg of the tour. The show was met with critical acclaim, with critics complimenting the singer's vocal clarity and stage presence, as well as the minimalist stage setting.

== Background ==
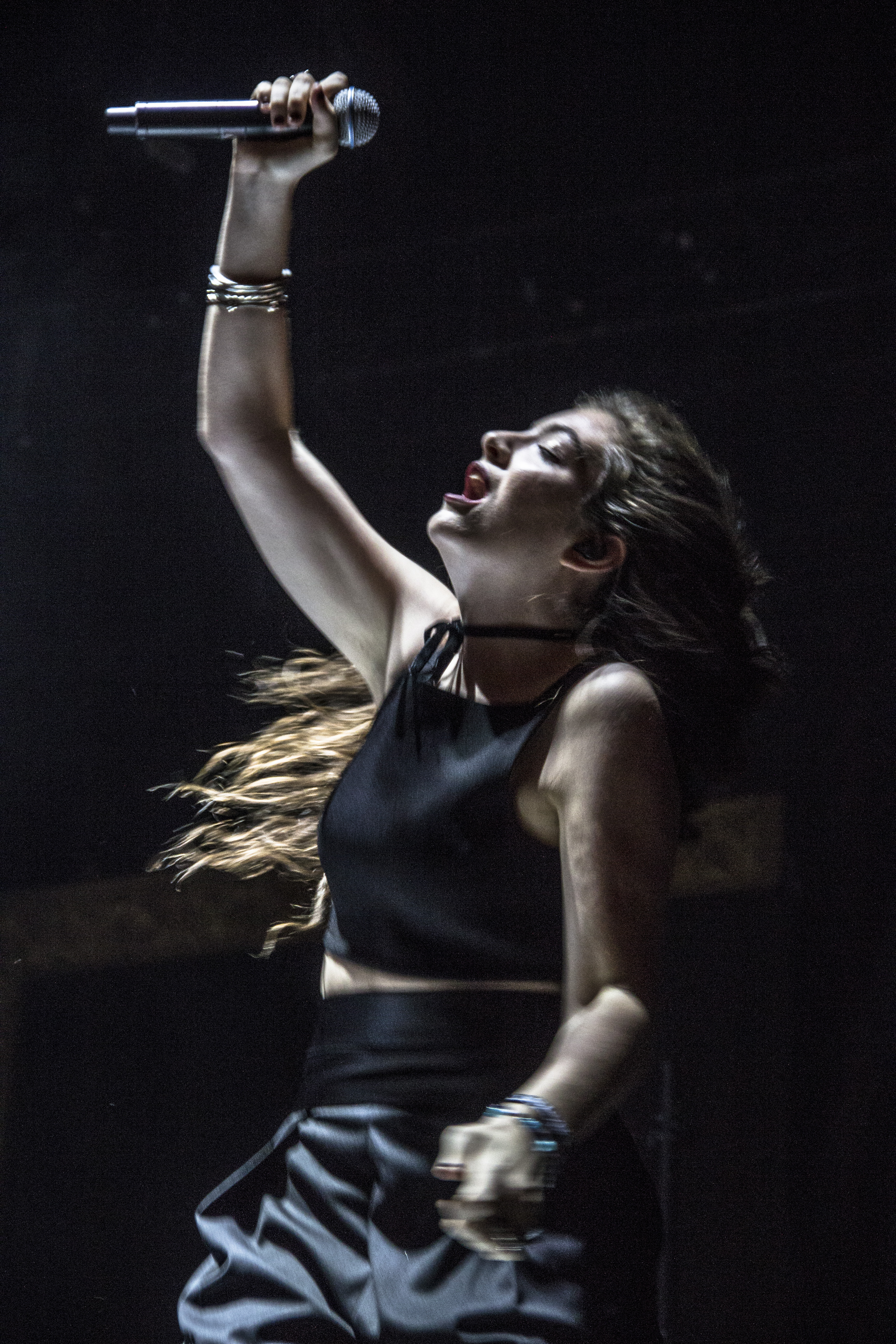
Lorde performing at the Boston Calling festival in 2014

Lorde's first major show was at Splendour in the Grass on 28 July 2013, where she served as a last-minute replacement for Frank Ocean, who had to cancel his appearance at the Australian music festival. Before this show, Lorde had performed only five public shows in small nightclubs and bars in New Zealand and Australia. On 7 August 2013, Lorde announced North American tour dates to support her debut album Pure Heroine (2013); Australian dates were announced two weeks later. Lorde premiered an unreleased song called "Good Fights" at a limited number of shows.

In an interview with Fuse, Lorde described the tour as "beautiful" and "stylized" with several costume changes. She declined an opening act spot for Katy Perry, saying it is important for an artist to establish themselves. "I'm just basically really stubborn and I want to be really independent. So I want to be headlining my own shows instead of supporting someone else."

Lorde prepared three segments of her show, demonstrating to American audiences the areas where she grew up, saying:

I had this idea I wanted it to be divided into three parts. The first part would be kind of my home and my life before everything happened to me, and be really suburban-feeling. I have these street lamps that are on stage with me, I very much wanted to anchor it in that world. And we went around and filmed in my town, and the jetty where I sit every day in summer, and the white tunnel you drive through going from Auckland to the Shore ... I got them to film in that tunnel, I wanted it to be of my world. And to be showing these American audiences, this is actually my spot. ... And then the concept ... goes into my head and dreams, and all the kind of abstract emotions you have when you are embarking on something like this. And the third section is the present day ... It's three quite clear acts. And that first one was all about home.

== Development ==
In an interview with Christopher Holder of AudioTechnology, James Mac, a keyboardist for Lorde, mentioned that he used two MacBook Pros installed with music software Ableton Live as part of the sound stage. Joel Little also arranged samples that were programmed with two Novation 61-key impulses. The pads on the impulse control "vocal samples, sirens, etc." while the keys play "drum racks on Ableton, or soft synths from the Arturia synth pack, or NI Massive." Mac also operated a mini keyboard which was used for loops during "[breaks] between songs."

When asked what front of house sound Lorde wanted on stage, Philip Harvey mentioned that she opted to have "big, loud and dynamic" audio for her set. Drummer Ben Barter was responsible for activating samples on a Roland SPD, an electronic drum percussion instrument. His set included a variety of microphones such as the Shure SM52A, a Sennheiser e904, two overhead AKG C414 microphones, a Shure SM81 microphone for hi-hat drums as well as a Shure SM57 for snare drums. The public address system (PAS) uses the JBL Vertec VT4889, 18 floor-stacked subwoofers, a Shure UR Wireless Microphone System, a Sennheiser G3 IEM as well as Dolby Lake Processors. Harvey also mentioned that the use of auxiliary send through various instruments at low information helped to modify the aux master for each song.

Harvey said that Lorde was not partial to selecting microphones so they tried several to see which would complement her vocal range. They tried a Telefunken M80, a Sennheiser MD431, and a Heil PR35 microphone with no success. However, Harvey said that during European promotional tours, Lorde used the Shure Beta58. She also opted to have the level of her backing vocals match her vocals live onstage. Brett Taylor, a monitor engineer, called Lorde's in-ear mix "idiosyncratic", saying it is rare when singers choose to display their vocals "almost underneath the backing vocal tracks." Lorde and her band use Sensaphonic in-ear monitors; her band also utilizes d&b M2 floor monitors.

== Concert synopsis ==
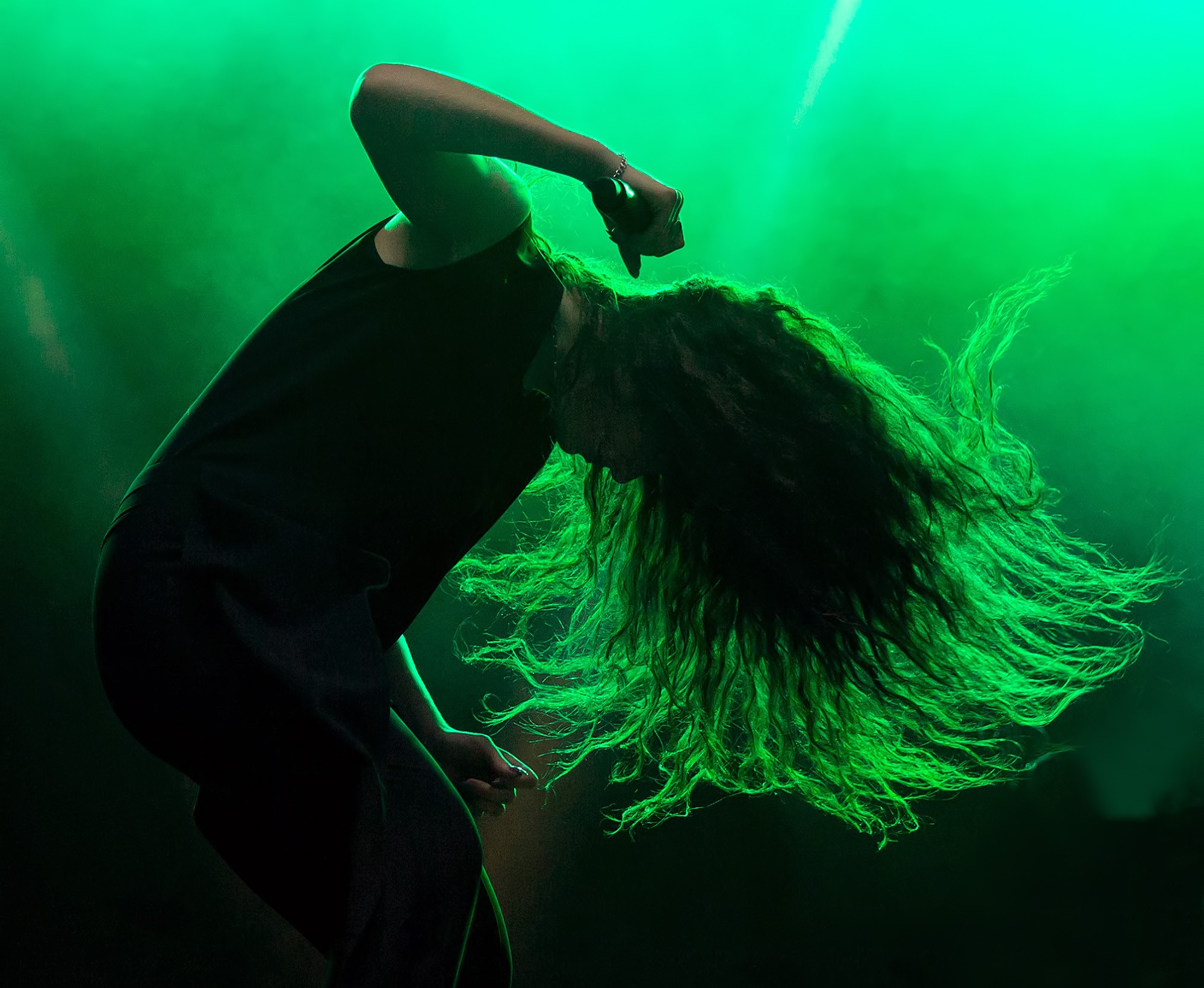
Lorde performing at the Austin City Limits festival, October 2014

The show was divided into three parts. The main show began with Lorde standing behind a black curtain, with one white spotlight and a faint chandelier onstage as she performed "Glory and Gore". Various light fixtures and Lorde's touring band were unveiled; the band consisted of Jimmy Mac, a DJ and keyboardist, as well as Ben Barter, a drummer. Lorde performed idiosyncratic dance moves as lights flickered and faded throughout the stage. She wore an oversized suit with a white tank top. The black curtain dropped to reveal a scarcely decorated set during "Biting Down"; three picture frames hung overhead. Her performance was accompanied by freeing dance routines.

During "Tennis Court", smoke and green light illuminated the stage; a video of boys playing a rugby match in the rain was shown in the background. The next song "Buzzcut Season" showcased another video documenting Lorde as she walked on a Devonport, New Zealand, pier and looked at the city's street lights. The stage was set in shades of blue. Before introducing "Still Sane", Lorde briefly mentioned her tour visuals, all filmed in Auckland, saying, "I've taken these places with me all around the world, all through America. And it's felt so comforting to have you on stage with me in a way every night." For "Swingin Party", a mirrored projection was shown to the audience. A background video depicting a neighborhood was shown on "400 Lux"; the video features locations such as the Victoria Park Tunnel. She introduced "Ribs" with a short monologue on the inspiration for the song; it was written during the month of February 2013 after she and her sister threw a party. She also cites her fear of aging as inspiration.

Lorde changed into a white pant suit, a crop top, and a coat before covering Kanye West's 2013 song "Hold My Liquor". The performance was followed by another costume change: a red outfit with a gold crown and cape. A chandelier lit the stage in gold colors and crown images were shown in the background during "Royals". A marquee that read, "Tonight: The Tragic and Wonderful Triumphal Procession of Lorde" was displayed. Another costume change, a metallic jumpsuit and a full-length cape, accompanied "Team". Different coloured spotlights shone throughout the set. An extended instrumental played as Lorde went offstage; Lorde returned with a gold robe as confetti cannons erupted.

== Reception ==
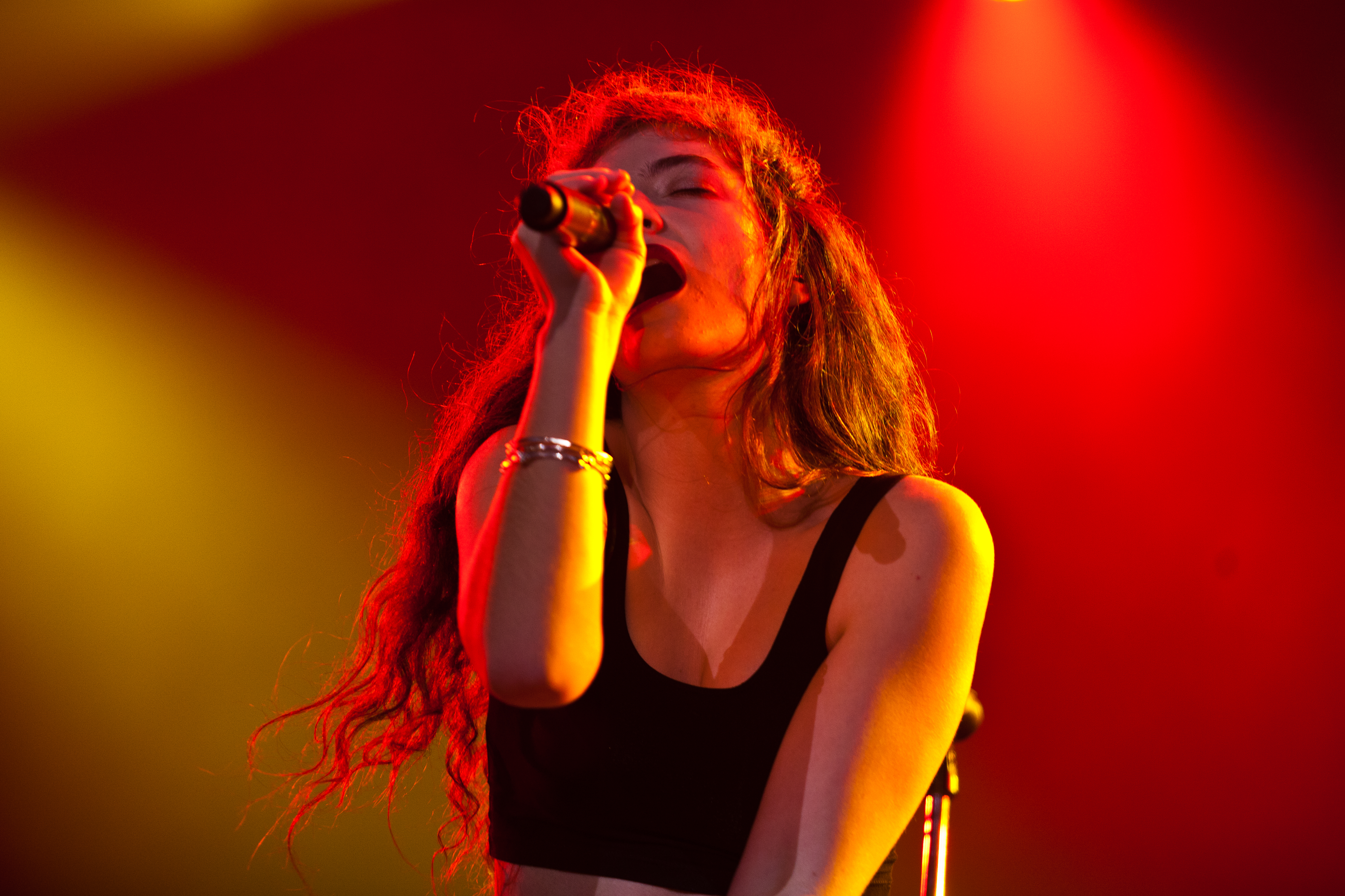
Lorde performing at Lollapalooza; critics called her set one of the highlights from the festival.

The Pure Heroine Tour was met with critical acclaim, with critics complimenting the singer's vocal clarity and stage presence as well as the minimalist stage setting. Brittany Spanos, writing for The Village Voice, placed the New York show on her list of the 10 Best Concerts in New York for the week of 30 September 2013. Davis Inman of American Songwriter called her Lollapalooza set in Chicago one of the highlights of the festival; her set received positive reviews from other publications, including Billboard and Rolling Stone, the latter deemed it the best segment of the Chicago event.

Kitty Empire of The Guardian gave a four out of five-star review of the concert at Shepherd's Bush Empire in London, writing that "dramatic visuals and a daring reworking of her songs see the teenage star in dazzling form". The Washington Post's Chris Richards described the minimalist setup of Lorde's backing duo as "highly efficient"; their setup was compared to English downtempo musician James Blake. Rachel Bache of The New Zealand Herald commented on Lorde's improved stage presence and enhanced vocal ability as well, stating that she "returned to her home town with a newfound boldness." PopMatters's William Carl Ferleman reviewed The Midland concert in Kansas City positively, stating that "it italicized an emerging artist who can solidly deliver her songs within a live setting" with few mistakes.

Writing for The Hollywood Reporter, Ashley Lee gave a positive review of the Roseland Ballroom concert in New York, calling it an "intimate introduction and joyful celebration of the textured alto singer and her troubled lyrics" though Lee had an ambivalent reaction to her obscure presence. Los Angeles Times writer August Brown gave a positive review of the Greek Theatre concert in Los Angeles, commending Lorde for "casting off the limits pop loves to put on young women and ... making full use of her talents and energy and these wide new stages." However, Brown was critical of her extended monologues and the "mock-film-marquee billboard" during her performance of "Royals". Foster Kamer of Complex called her Brooklyn concert an "impressive, charismatic performance that shows Lorde already outgrowing her material" though he had mixed reactions towards "muddy vocal mixes" and backing tracks.

== Opening acts ==
- Nick Mulvey (Europe)
- Until the Ribbon Breaks (North America)
- Lo-Fang (North America)
- Majical Cloudz (North America)
- Doprah (Oceania)
- Oliver Tank (Oceania)
- Safia (Oceania)
- Yumi Zouma (Oceania)

== Set list ==
This setlist is from the show on 18 March 2014. It does not represent all the concerts during the tour. Lorde changed the covers as the tour progressed, including Kanye West's "Flashing Lights" and "Hold My Liquor" as well as Bon Iver's "Heavenly Father".

1. "Glory and Gore"
2. "Biting Down"
3. "Tennis Court"
4. "White Teeth Teens"
5. "Buzzcut Season"
6. "Swingin Party" (The Replacements cover)
7. "Still Sane"
8. "400 Lux"
9. "Bravado"
10. "Easy" (Son Lux cover)
11. "Ribs"
12. "Royals"
13. "Team"
14. "A World Alone"

== Tour dates ==
Date	City	Country	Venue
Oceania
28 July 2013 (Note: The 28 July 2013 show was part of Splendour in the Grass 2013)	Byron Bay	Australia	North Byron Parklands
North America
6 August 2013	New York City	United States	Le Poisson Rouge
8 August 2013	Los Angeles	United States	Echoplex
Europe
10 September 2013	Berlin	Germany	Clärchens Ballroom
18 September 2013	London	England	White Heat at Madame Jojo's
North America
24 September 2013	Los Angeles	United States	The Fonda Theatre
25 September 2013	Los Angeles	United States	Belasco Theater
27 September 2013	San Francisco	United States	The Fillmore
28 September 2013 (Note: The 28 July 2013 show was part of Decibel Festival 2013)	Seattle	United States	Showbox at The Market
30 September 2013	New York City	United States	Webster Hall
1 October 2013	New York City	United States	Webster Hall
3 October 2013	New York City	United States	Warsaw
6 October 2013	Toronto	Canada	Danforth Music Hall
Oceania
16 October 2013	Brisbane	Australia	The Zoo
17 October 2013	Sydney	Australia	The Metro Theatre
18 October 2013	Sydney	Australia	The Metro Theatre
19 October 2013	Canberra	Australia	Zierholz at UC
21 October 2013	Melbourne	Australia	Corner Hotel
22 October 2013	Melbourne	Australia	Corner Hotel
North America
3 December 2013 (Note: The 3 December 2013 show was part of Deck the Hall Ball 2013)	Seattle	United States	KeyArena
4 December 2013	Portland	United States	Crystal Ballroom
7 December 2013 (Note: The 7 December 2013 show was part of Live 105's Not So Silent Night 2013)	Oakland	United States	Oracle Arena
8 December 2013 (Note: The 8 December 2013 show was part of KROQ Almost Acoustic Christmas 2013)	Los Angeles	United States	Shrine Auditorium
Oceania
29 January 2014 (Note: The 29 January 2014 show was part of Laneway Festival Auckland 2013)	Auckland	New Zealand	Silo Park
31 January 2014 (Note: The 31 January 2014 show was part of Laneway Festival Brisbane 2014)	Brisbane	Australia	RNA Showgrounds
1 February 2014 (Note: The 1 February 2014 show was part of Laneway Festival Melbourne 2014)	Melbourne	Australia	Footscray Community Arts Centre
2 February 2014 (Note: The 2 February 2014 show was part of Laneway Festival Sydney 2014)	Sydney	Australia	Sydney College of The Arts
8 February 2014 (Note: The 8 February 2014 show was part of Laneway Festival Fremantle 2014)	Perth	Australia	The Esplanade
North America
3 March 2014	Austin	United States	Austin Music Hall
4 March 2014	Dallas	United States	South Side Ballroom
5 March 2014	Houston	United States	Bayou Music Center
7 March 2014	Washington, D.C.	United States	Echostage
8 March 2014	Upper Darby	United States	Tower Theater
10 March 2014	New York City	United States	Roseland Ballroom
11 March 2014	New York City	United States	Roseland Ballroom
12 March 2014	New York City	United States	Roseland Ballroom
14 March 2014	Boston	United States	Orpheum Theatre
15 March 2014	Toronto	Canada	Sound Academy
16 March 2014	Detroit	United States	The Fillmore Detroit
18 March 2014	Chicago	United States	Aragon Ballroom
20 March 2014	St. Louis	United States	Peabody Opera House
21 March 2014	Kansas City	United States	Arvest Bank Theatre
22 March 2014	Denver	United States	Fillmore Auditorium
24 March 2014	Seattle	United States	WaMu Theater
26 March 2014	Oakland	United States	Fox Oakland Theatre
27 March 2014	Oakland	United States	Fox Oakland Theatre
Latin America
30 March 2014 (Note: The 30 March 2014 show was part of Lollapalooza Chile 2014)	Santiago	Chile	O'Higgins Park
1 April 2014 (Note: The 1 April 2014 show was part of Lollapalooza Argentina 2014)	San Isidro	Argentina	Hipódromo de San Isidro
5 April 2014 (Note: The 5 April 2014 show was part of Lollapalooza Brazil 2014)	São Paulo	Brazil	Autódromo de Interlagos
8 April 2014 (Note: The 8 April 2014 show was part of San Miguel Sound 2014)	San Miguel de Allende	Mexico	Plaza de Toros Oriente
9 April 2014	Mexico City	Mexico	Auditorio BB
North America
12 April 2014 (Note: The 12 April 2014 show was part of Coachella 2014)	Indio	United States	Empire Polo Grounds
15 April 2014 (Note: The 15 April 2014 show was part of The Cosmopolitan of Las Vegas' Valley to Vegas: Spring Concert Series 2014)	Las Vegas	United States	Boulevard Pool
17 April 2014	Phoenix	United States	Comerica Theatre
19 April 2014 (Note: The 19 April 2014 show was part of Coachella 2014)	Indio	United States	Empire Polo Grounds
Europe
24 May 2014 (Note: The 24 May 2014 show was part of BBC Radio 1's Big Weekend 2014)	Glasgow	Scotland	Glasgow Green
26 May 2014	Utrecht	Netherlands	TivoliVredenburg Ronda
29 May 2014	Berlin	Germany	Columbiahalle
31 May 2014 (Note: The 31 May 2014 show was part of Rock in Rio Lisbon 2014)	Lisbon	Portugal	Parque da Bela Vista
1 June 2014 (Note: The 1 June 2014 show was part of We Love Green 2014)	Paris	France	Parc de Bagatelle
5 June 2014	London	England	O_{2} Shepherd's Bush Empire
6 June 2014	London	England	O_{2} Brixton Academy
7 June 2014 (Note: Lorde opened for Arcade Fire on 7 June 2014)	London	England	Earls Court
Oceania
5 July 2014	Perth	Australia	HBF Stadium
8 July 2014	Adelaide	Australia	Adelaide Entertainment Centre
11 July 2014	Sydney	Australia	Hordern Pavilion
12 July 2014	Sydney	Australia	Hordern Pavilion
15 July 2014	Melbourne	Australia	Festival Hall
16 July 2014	Melbourne	Australia	Festival Hall
19 July 2014	Newcastle	Australia	Newcastle Entertainment Centre
20 July 2014	Brisbane	Australia	Riverstage
Asia
27 July 2014 (Note: The 27 July 2014 show was part of Fuji Rock Festival 2014)	Niigata	Japan	Naeba Ski Resort
29 July 2014	Tokyo	Japan	Shinagawa Stellar Ball
North America
1 August 2014 (Note: The 1 August 2014 show was part of Lollapalooza 2014)	Chicago	United States	Grant Park
3 August 2014 (Note: The 3 August 2014 show was part of Osheaga Festival 2014)	Montreal	Canada	Parc Jean-Drapeau
5 September 2014	Philadelphia	United States	Mann Center
6 September 2014 (Note: The 6 September 2014 show was part of Boston Calling Music Festival Fall 2014)	Boston	United States	City Plaza Hall
7 September 2014	Lewiston	United States	Artpark Amphitheater
11 September 2014 (Note: The 11 September 2014 show was part of Ottawa Folk Festival 2014)	Ottawa	Canada	Hog's Back Park
12 September 2014	Toronto	Canada	Echo Beach
14 September 2014	New York City	United States	Pier 97, Hudson River Park
15 September 2014	New York City	United States	United Palace
16 September 2014	New York City	United States	United Palace
18 September 2014	Raleigh	United States	Red Hat Amphitheater
19 September 2014 (Note: The 19 September 2014 show was part of Music Midtown 2014)	Atlanta	United States	Piedmont Park
20 September 2014 (Note: The 20 September 2014 show was part of iHeartRadio Music Festival 2014)	Las Vegas	United States	MGM Grand Garden Arena
22 September 2014	Nashville	United States	Grand Ole Opry House
23 September 2014	Columbus	United States	Lifestyle Communities Pavilion
24 September 2014	Cleveland	United States	Jacobs Pavilion at Nautica
26 September 2014	Milwaukee	United States	BMO Harris Pavilion
27 September 2014	Council Bluffs	United States	Harrah's Stir Concert Cove
29 September 2014	Broomfield	United States	1stBank Center
30 September 2014	Las Vegas	United States	The Joint at Hard Rock Hotel
2 October 2014	Berkeley	United States	Hearst Greek Theatre
6 October 2014	Los Angeles	United States	Greek Theatre
7 October 2014	Los Angeles	United States	Greek Theatre
9 October 2014	Santa Barbara	United States	Santa Barbara Bowl
10 October 2014	San Diego	United States	Cal Coast Credit Union Open Air Theatre
12 October 2014 (Note: The 12 October 2014 show was part of Austin City Limits 2014)	Austin	United States	Zilker Park
Oceania
27 October 2014	Christchurch	New Zealand	Horncastle Arena
29 October 2014	Dunedin	New Zealand	Dunedin Town Hall
31 October 2014	Wellington	New Zealand	TSB Bank Arena
1 November 2014	Auckland	New Zealand	Vector Arena

=== Cancelled shows ===
List of postponed concerts, showing date, city, country, venue and reason for postponement
Date	City	Country	Venue	Reason
27 January 2014 (Note: The 27 January 2014 show was part of Laneway Festival Auckland 2013)	Auckland	New Zealand	Silo Park	Scheduling conflict
24 April 2014	Melbourne	Australia	Festival Hall	Chest infection
26 April 2014	Melbourne	Australia	Festival Hall	Chest infection
27 April 2014	Adelaide	Australia	Adelaide Entertainment Centre	Chest infection
29 April 2014	Perth	Australia	Challenge Stadium	Chest infection
2 May 2014	Sydney	Australia	Hordern Pavilion	Chest infection
3 May 2014	Sydney	Australia	Hordern Pavilion	Chest infection
4 May 2014	Newcastle	Australia	Newcastle Entertainment Centre	Chest infection
6 May 2014	Brisbane	Australia	Riverstage	Chest infection
