= Scream & Shout =

2012 single by will.i.am and Britney Spears

Single by will.i.am and Britney Spears

from the album #willpower
- Released: November 19, 2012
- Recorded: 2012
- Studio: Record Plant (Hollywood, California); The Blue Room (Hoogstraten, Belgium)
- Genre: Dance-pop; electropop
- Length: 4:44; 4:13 (clean radio edit)
- Label: Interscope
- Songwriters: Jean-Baptiste Kouame; Tulisa Contostavlos; Jef Martens; William Adams
- Producer: Lazy Jay

will.i.am singles chronology
"In My City" (2012)	"Scream & Shout" (2012)	"#thatPower" (2013)

Britney Spears singles chronology
"Criminal" (2011)	"Scream & Shout" (2012)	"Ooh La La" (2013)

Music videos
- "Scream & Shout" on YouTube: "Scream & Shout" (remix) on YouTube

"Scream & Shout" is a song by American rapper will.i.am and American singer Britney Spears, taken from the former's fourth studio album, #willpower (2013). It was released on November 19, 2012, by Interscope Records as the second single from the album, and sent to mainstream radio in the United States on November 27. The song was written by will.i.am, Tulisa, Jean Baptiste, and Belgian producer Lazy Jay, with additional production by will.i.am. "Scream & Shout" is an upbeat dance pop song; its lyrics are about having a good time on a night out. It includes a reference to the lyric "Britney, bitch" from Spears' 2007 single "Gimme More".

"Scream & Shout" received mixed reviews from music critics. Some critics described the song as a dark club track, but others criticized the use of Auto-Tune on the vocals. The song was a commercial success worldwide, topping the charts in over 24 countries and reached the top five in Australia, Czech Republic, Russia, Slovakia, South Korea and Sweden. In the United States, the song peaked at number three on the Billboard Hot 100 and became the first number one song of the newly established Dance/Electronic Songs chart. In the United Kingdom, "Scream & Shout" became will.i.am's second consecutive song to top the UK Singles Chart, Spears' sixth, and her first since "Everytime" in June 2004.

An accompanying music video directed by Ben Mor was shot in October 2012, and premiered in the U.S. during a live episode of The X Factor on November 28. The theme of the music video is multiplicity, and critics complimented its futuristic setting. "Scream & Shout" also served as the theme song for a television commercial for Beats by Dr. Dre Color headphones. A remixed version of the song, featuring Hit-Boy, Waka Flocka Flame, Lil Wayne and Diddy, was uploaded to will.i.am's official YouTube account on January 25, 2013, after it was leaked on the internet earlier the same day. A music video for this version was filmed in January 2013 and released on February 14.

== Background and release ==
After Spears spent a year promoting her seventh studio album Femme Fatale (2011), RCA Records executive vice president of promotions Joe Riccitelli said that Spears would take a year off from the music business to "be a mom and get married." Later in May 2012, it was confirmed that Spears would be joining fellow singer Demi Lovato as a judge on the second US season of The X Factor. On August 28, 2012, Spears confirmed that she was recording new material with will.i.am, and said on social network Twitter, "Can't wait for y'all to hear @iamwill's next single featuring me." They had worked together the previous year on two tracks for Femme Fatale, one of which, called "Big Fat Bass", was included on the album. The song, rumored to be named "Sexy Sexy" at the time, was going to be released on will.i.am's album #willpower on October 15, 2012; however, will.i.am changed the release date after several tracks from the album were leaked online. He said, "I’m trying to finish #willpower…& now because of all the leaks I have push the album back to make new songs…"

On October 12, 2012, Spears confirmed that the track would be called "Scream & Shout". On November 17, 2012, the song was leaked in full online. When asked about how he felt about it being released earlier than expected, will.i.am said, "Well, that's done. You can't undo it. It's out. It made it real. But once things go to the editing and coloring, it's not in your control." Spears used her official Facebook account to express her sadness about the early release of the song, but added, "I AM super excited that my fans seem to love it as much as will.i.am and I do. It hits radio tmw and iTunes later in the week." Billboard confirmed the release of "Scream & Shout" on U.S. radio station 102.7 KIIS-FM on November 19 at 12:00 pm Pacific Standard Time. The same day, the song had its UK radio premiere on Capital FM at 8:00 pm Greenwich Mean Time, and had a digital promotional release in Europe. The song was released for digital download worldwide the following day, and was officially sent to mainstream radio by Interscope Records on November 27, 2012. will.i.am revealed the cover art for "Scream & Shout" on November 19 on his Facebook account.

British singer Tulisa co-wrote the original version of "Scream & Shout" with Jean Baptiste and recorded it under the title "I Don't Give a Fuck". The track was intended for her debut album The Female Boss (2012). However, the producer of the track, Lazy Jay, did not want Tulisa to have the song and gave it to will.i.am, who re-wrote the song with Spears in mind. Despite Tulisa's claim that her vocals can still be heard on the song, she was not credited with co-writing "Scream & Shout" originally, which prevented her from collecting any royalties from the song's release. She filed a lawsuit in 2012 against will.i.am and won in 2018, entitling her to 10% of publishing rights.

== Composition ==
"Scream & Shout" (2012)
A 27-second sample of "Scream & Shout", where will.i.am and Spears trade rap lines. Spears' vocals were compared to those of Madonna and Nicki Minaj, while a Rap-Up reviewer noticed the use of Auto-Tune on will.i.am's vocals.

"Scream & Shout" is an upbeat dance-pop track, set to a moderate tempo of 130 beats per minute. It contains lyrics about having an enjoyable night out. The track begins with Spears rapping the first eight lines with Nicki Minaj-esque vocals. As the song proceeds to its chorus, will.i.am joins Spears on vocals. "Scream & Shout" includes a reference to the lyric "It's Britney, bitch", which was first used on Spears' 2007 single "Gimme More", and is used before every breakdown on the track.

Spin writer Marc Hogan wrote that "Scream & Shout" has similarities to Azealia Banks' song "212" (2011), and compared "Scream & Shout"'s background vocals to those of "Are We All We Are" (2012) by Pink. Keith Caulfield of Billboard said that the song "features a very different look for Spears, whose voice is roboticized to a nearly unrecognizable degree." Rebecca Macatee of E! Online wrote that the track is "clubby, catchy, cool", and compared Spears' vocals to those of Madonna, and wrote about the use of pitch-correcting software Auto-Tune on the song. Bill Lamb of About.com wrote that "the digital effects are seamless and the use of modulations of Britney Spears' voice to build the chorus sounds perfectly natural in this context", and that, "the spacey, free form bridge is beautiful despite will.i.am's singing talent limitations." A Rap-Up reviewer noted the use of Auto-Tune on will.i.am's vocals.

== Critical reception ==
"Scream & Shout" received mixed reviews from music critics. Michael Murray of RyanSeacrest.com said the song "is like nothing we’ve ever heard", commenting that will.i.am utilizes "his signature electric beats" while Spears embraces an alter-ego. MTV contributor Jocelyn Vena called the track "a club banger", and said it is "an amped up dance-floor anthem, full of tempo changes, sassy one-liners and dubstep aplenty." Robert Copsey of Digital Spy wrote that upon first hearing the track he found it confusing, but after repeated plays he found it a "surprisingly catchy robo-pop stomper." After detailing the release of "Scream & Shout", a reviewer for Take 40 Australia wrote that the track "has all the hallmarks of a hit Will.i.am song". An AOL On reviewer called it a "dance floor anthem" and stated that "perhaps the best part of the song is the best one-liner from Britney's 'Gimme More' – "It's Britney, bitch."

Jenna Hally Rubenstein of MTV Buzzworthy called "Scream & Shout" a "futuristic electro jam", and wrote that parts of it "had us weeping and repenting, like that moment where Brit does a heavy Madonna-fied English accent and that other time will.i.am goes all 'Gimme More' on us with 'It's Britney, bitch'." Chris Eggertsen of HitFix rated the track a B−, and wrote that, "the dubstep-y beat on offer is certainly a booty-shaker, but it lacks the extra "oomph" and originality that would make "Scream and Shout" a truly memorable single. It's the kind of club track that's serviceable enough in the moment, but it's not likely to stick in your head on the cab ride home at 2 a.m.". Emily Exton of PopDust contributor wrote that Spears' contribution is an improvement from "will's monotonous requests to 'lose control', 'let it go' and 'hit the floor'," but said that the song needed "something more from Britney to balance this out." Jason Lipshutz of Billboard news writer wrote that will.i.am "could have utilized Spears' presence in a more efficient manner, but [the song's] goal of inspiring awkward dance moves via its impossibly straightforward chorus ... is soundly accomplished."

Yahoo!'s Kathleen Perricone gave "Scream & Shout" a mixed review, and said it was "not exactly worthy of all the hype", and Alicia Lutes of Hollywood.com criticized its lyrical meaning and repetitive production. Malene Arpe of Toronto Star wrote that it "is really terrible and rather than making you want to scream and shout, it sorta lulls you into a nice nap-like state of ceasing to care around the three-minute mark." The Huffington Post journalist Kia Makarechi called the song a "competent piece of airy dance pop", and wrote that the only mildly inspiring moment on "Scream & Shout" is the sample from "Gimme More". An editorial writer from Popjustice was negative towards "Scream & Shout" and Pitbull's song "Feel This Moment" (2012), stating that what the "two songs represent is pop music writhing around in its own shit." Kurt Schlosser of NBCNews.com also criticized the song's lyrical content, and wrote that it "plays like a forgotten sample from a Black Eyed Peas song, with Britney doing the Fergie talkie parts ... " and that it is will.i.am's song.

It is also the victor of Billboard's 2013 reader-voted March Madness contest, against hits by Kelly Clarkson, Rihanna and Pink, among others.

== Chart performance ==
"Scream & Shout" made its first chart appearance on November 28, 2012, debuting at number 27 on the Spanish Singles Chart, before leaving the top 30 the next week. On its 14th week, the song reached the top of the chart. On the French Singles Chart, for the week of November 19, 2012, "Scream & Shout" debuted at number 6. The next week it reached number 2, staying there for two weeks. On the week ending January 26, 2013, the song peaked at number 1. In the United Kingdom, "Scream & Shout" became will.i.am's fourth consecutive top five single, and debuted on the UK Singles Chart at number 2. It was also Spears' first UK top five hit since "Womanizer", which peaked at number 3 in 2008. On January 13, 2013, it reached number 1, where it stayed for two weeks, making it will.i.am's fourth number one single and Spears' sixth and her first number one since "Everytime" (2004). In two months of release, it sold over 513,000 units in the UK according to the Official Charts Company. "Scream & Shout" also debuted at number 1 on the UK R&B Chart, where it stayed for seven weeks. Elsewhere in Europe, the song remained number one in Germany for nine consecutive weeks, Belgium(Flanders) and Luxembourg for eight weeks, Netherlands for seven straight weeks (her first number 1 since "Oops!...I Did It Again" in 2000), Belgium(Wallonia) and Finland for five straight weeks, Austria, Denmark, Ireland, Italy, Norway and Switzerland for four weeks and Scotland for three weeks. It also reached the top 10 in Czech Republic, Hungary, Poland, Slovakia and Sweden. In South Korea, it entered the Gaon Chart at number 3, with over 30,000 digital units sold.

In the United States, because of low airplay and streaming, "Scream & Shout" first entered the Billboard Bubbling Under Hot 100 Singles chart at number 3, before debuting at number 12 on the Hot 100. It was Spears' 29th appearance on the Hot 100 and her fourth-highest debut. The song rose from number 66 to number 1 on the Hot Digital Songs, with 196,000 digital units sold, becoming Spears' seventh number 1 on the component chart and will.i.am's second as a solo artist. The song's rise is the greatest in the chart's history, beating the 57–1 rise of Zac Efron, Andrew Seeley and Vanessa Hudgens' "Breaking Free" (from Disney's High School Musical) the week of February 11, 2006. "Scream & Shout" also debuted at number 33 on the Pop Songs component chart, becoming Spears' 30th hit on that chart and equaling Mariah Carey for the second-most entries in the chart's 20-year history. It peaked at number 3. The song also entered the Latin Pop Airplay component chart at number 33, where it peaked at number 20. On the week ending January 19, 2013, "Scream & Shout" reached number eight on the Hot 100, becoming will.i.am's third solo top 10 hit and his first as a lead artist. It also passed 1 million in digital sales in the country that week. It peaked at number three on the chart. The song debuted at number 39 in Canada, and reached number 3 the following week. Four weeks later it reached number one, staying there for four weeks and becoming will.i.am's first Canadian number one single and Spears's ninth. "Scream & Shout" was the first number-one single on Billboard's new Dance/Electronic Songs chart in its first issue, published on January 26, 2013. As of July 2013, the song has sold 3 million digital copies in the United States. Scream & Shout become Bing's 7th most searches song in Germany.

The song entered the New Zealand Singles Chart at number 26 on December 3, 2012, reaching number 2 the following week, where it remained for another week before reaching number 1 on December 24, 2012, becoming the 2012 New Zealand Christmas number 1, and earning a 2 times Platinum certification from the Recording Industry Association of New Zealand for selling over 30,000 units there. "Scream & Shout" debuted on the Australian Singles Chart at number 32 on December 9, 2012. The following week, it reached number 5 and peaked at number 2 on the week ending December 23, 2012, making it Spears' highest-charting single in Australia since "Piece of Me" (2008). It also topped the Australian Dance Chart and has been certified 6 times Platinum by the Australian Recording Industry Association denoting sales of 420,000 copies. In May 2023, "Scream & Shout" reached 1 billion views on YouTube, marking Spears' first entry into the "Billion Views Club". For will.i.am, it marks his second entry overall and first as a solo artist.

== Music video ==
=== Development ===
There are few people on the planet who inspire me like will.i.am does. I couldn't be more excited to work with him again. I can't wait for people to hear the song and see the video.

— Spears about working with will.i.am.

After confirming he was working with Spears in August 2012, will.i.am tweeted her saying "OMG...your lookin fit & hot...can't wait to shoot the video to our song...your fans are ganna love it...". The music video was directed by Ben Mor and filmed on October 13–14, 2012, in Los Angeles. Behind the scenes footage of the video recording—in which according to the Daily Mirror Spears wore a Herve Leger dress and black gloves—was leaked on October 14. When asked about the video's concept and style, will.i.am said that it will include "uber fresh fashion", and that he intended to release the video and song together.

On November 23, 2012, a short preview of the music video was aired during a promotional commercial for X Factor. Jessica Sager of Pop Crush wrote that will.i.am "sports a black suit, while Spears rocks a futuristic, black, seemingly 'Barbarella'-inspired look." On November 26, 2012, will.i.am tweeted that the video edit had been finished, and added, "I'm so happy and excited for everyone to see it ... ". The music video for "Scream & Shout" premiered in the US during a live episode of The X Factor on November 28, 2012, and was made available for viewing on Vevo immediately after the show's broadcast on the west coast.

=== Concept ===
A scene of the video with several images of Spears, representing the multiplicity theme

The music video's theme is multiplicity. Mor said that the idea "was essentially trying to reduce what the song is about to symbols. And that's what it was...just really keeping it clean and iconic." The video opens with intercalated beauty shots of will.i.am and Spears, until the scene cuts to will.i.am using his iPhone camera add-on and social network iam+. will.i.am says "bring the action", and Spears is seen wearing a skin-tight skirt and a long-sleeved top with bare midriff and cleavage. Spears is seen atop a white box and posing to the camera. When the track's chorus begins, will.i.am appears in front of an empty black background and is joined by Spears, who is now wearing a corseted leotard accented with feathers, standing on a moving walkway, and they sing together. After the first "Britney, bitch" line is heard, dancers perform to "Scream & Shout". The video cuts to intercalated scenes of flaming disco balls, Spears image multiplied, and will.i.am wearing several gold accessories, including a cap with a gold plate that reads 'King'. Mor said that the video has no narrative, and that, "there's no deep meaning to any of it...To me it was just about, you know, every scene is like a photo. I just liked it, I liked seeing the human heads, and I liked seeing the gold chains off of the plaques and then making it scroll. And then it was an awesome way to introduce characters, some friends of Will...so that it wasn't just about them." Amy Sciaretto of Pop Crush compared Spears' look on the video to a "sexy, futuristic librarian".

=== Reception ===
The accompanying pop video received a positive reception from fans, according to Softpedia blogger Elena Gorgan. Following the premiere on The X Factor, will.i.am thanked his fans for their overwhelmingly positive feedback, tweeting, "Wow!!! I feel so excited and full of energy right now!!! I want to #screamANDshout. Thank you all." Bruna Nessif of E! Online said that the video "wasn't too crazy, but it definitely provided the futuristic vibe that will.i.am is famous from," and Melinda Newman of HitFix praised Spears' hairstyle and make-up, and wrote, "the futuristic, minimalistic clip is a cheap-looking affair that displays no chemistry between [will.i.am and Spears]". Katie Atkinson of MTV compared Spears' persona on the video to Brigitte Bardot and wrote, "if anyone doubted her enduring sex appeal, Spears proved she's still got it, in a midriff-baring bodycon dress ... and a corseted leotard accented with feathers in later scenes." 4music critic Jenny Mensah said that Spears "sounds less Southern belle and more Swedish dominatrix in the video, as she takes on a deep, authoritative voice." Hollywood.com blogger Leanne Aguilera wrote that despite not dancing in the video, Spears "does look phenomenal. With her teased blonde locks, sexy (yet age-appropriate) pencil skirt and the highest of high heels, Ms. Spears looks sultry yet sophisticated."

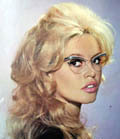
Critics compared Spears' appearance to that of Brigitte Bardot (left) and Barbarella (right).

Writing for iVillage, Donna Kaufman praised will.i.am and Spears on the video, saying that the latter "looks like the pop star of the future," while Erin Strecker of Entertainment Weekly wrote that Spears' style on the video is similar to her "Stronger" (2000) music video and that will.i.am, "for his part, does his best to get it started with a KING crown and plenty of technological devises, before performing some futuristic slow-mo running and watching approvingly as the back-up dancers party on." Yahoo! Music blogger Wendy Geller wrote that Spears' accent on the song was "terrible", that "her physique is looking undeniably good" on the video, and that Spears "is looking to be in a much, much healthier place than she was the last time she tried to sound all cockney. So she gets a pass in our book." Sadao Turner of RyanSeacrest.com said that the video looked like a Sharper Image Catalog coming to life in a nightclub, and T. Kyle of MTV Buzzworthy wrote that "'Scream & Shout' is pure fire, and Britney's parts in the video are ... very cool and amazing".

Andrew Villagomez of Out wrote that the product placement seen throughout the video is nothing new, complimented Spears confidence and sex appeal, and that Spears "gives Lana Del Rey a run for her money with a spy-like updo." The Huffington Post journalist Jessica Misener wrote that despite Spears' outfits in the video were "sizzling hot", that "[h]er blonde hair looks great and her body is amazing, and you know we love her oodles of gold bling," and that it was the "hottest Britney music video look" since "Toxic" (2004). Yahaira Toribio of Terra called the video will.i.am's "high-end technological wonderland" and wrote that "for all the choreography going on in this clip ... all we get is [Spears] standing and sitting pretty."

== Usage in media ==
"Scream & Shout" was used as a backing track to a television commercial to promote Beats by Dr. Dre Color headphones. The commercial featured celebrities Azealia Banks, Zedd, Ellie Goulding, Lil Wayne, 2 Chainz, Zendaya, Cam Newton, LeBron James and will.i.am. On January 26, 2013, a parody of the song was featured in a sketch of Saturday Night Live, in which the lyrics were changed to "When I walk down the street, all eyes on me". On September 29, 2013, the song was played during the warm-up of the Star Magic Games 2013 at the Lourdes School of Mandaluyong. "Weird Al" Yankovic covered the song as part of his polka medley "NOW That's What I Call Polka!" for his 2014 album Mandatory Fun. "Scream & Shout" is featured in Dance Central Spotlight as DLC and in Just Dance 2017.

== Live performances ==
Spears and will.i.am did not perform any televised performances of "Scream & Shout" together, however, will.i.am did perform the song, most notably at the NRJ Music Awards. The song was used in an interlude on Britney: Piece of Me, Spears' Las Vegas residency show.

== Remix version ==
"Scream & Shout (remix)"

Single by will.i.am and Britney Spears featuring Hit-Boy, Waka Flocka Flame, Lil Wayne and Diddy
- Released: January 29, 2013
- Recorded: 2012–2013
- Genre: R&B; hip hop
- Length: 5:56
- Label: Interscope
- Songwriters: Chauncey Hollis; Dwayne Carter; Sean Combs; Jean Baptiste; Rashad Muhammad; Raymond Martin; Jef Martens; Juaquin Malphurs; John Wesley; William Adams
- Producers: Hit-Boy; HazeBanga; Rey Reel; will.i.am

Music video
- "Scream & Shout (Remix)" on YouTube

After the track was leaked online, Spears said she was "gonna do some sick remixes too" and asked "who would you like to remix 'Scream & Shout'?" On January 1, 2013, will.i.am said that he would release a club remix of "Scream & Shout" featuring American rapper Waka Flocka Flame and producer Hit-Boy. An early version of the remix was leaked on January 25, 2013. The remix features Waka Flocka Flame, Hit-Boy, Diddy, and Lil Wayne. Following the leak, will.i.am uploaded the finished version to his YouTube account. It was released for digital download on January 29, 2013. Because it is significantly different from the original version, the remix was tracked separately on the Billboard charts. On the week ending February 16, 2013, it debuted at number 49 on the Hot R&B/Hip-Hop Songs. An accompanying music video was filmed in Los Angeles, California on January 23, 2013, and will.i.am said that the remix is "so freaking fresh that we had to do a video for it." The video was due to premiere on February 15, 2013, at BET's 106 & Park. However, the day before its planned release it was leaked online through Youku, and was therefore uploaded to Vevo the same day.

== Formats and track listings ==
- CD single
  1. "Scream & Shout" (with Britney Spears) – 4:44
  2. "Scream & Shout" (with Britney Spears) [Clean Radio Edit] – 4:10
- Vinyl 7", 45 RPM
  1. "Scream & Shout" (with Britney Spears) – 4:44
  2. "Scream & Shout" (Hit-Boy Remix) (with Britney Spears featuring Hit-Boy, Waka Flocka Flame, Lil Wayne and Diddy) – 5:56
- Digital download
  1. "Scream & Shout" (with Britney Spears) – 4:44
  2. "Scream & Shout" (Peter Rauhofer Remix) – 8:20
- Digital download – radio edit
  1. "Scream & Shout" (with Britney Spears) [Radio Edit] – 4:12
- Digital download – remix
  1. "Scream & Shout" (Hit-Boy Remix) (with Britney Spears featuring Hit-Boy, Waka Flocka Flame, Lil Wayne and Diddy) – 5:55

== Credits and personnel ==
Recording

- Instrumentation recorded at The Blue Room in Hoogstraten, Belgium.
- will.i.am's vocals recorded at The Record Plant in Hollywood, California.
- Britney Spears's vocals recorded at Studio Malibu in Malibu, California.
- Mixed at The Record Plant in Hollywood, California.

Personnel

- Jef "Lazy Jay" Martens – producer, keyboards, drums, midi programming, songwriter
- will.i.am – songwriter, additional producer, lead vocals, engineer, background vocals, synths, bass, drum programming, moog bass
- Tulisa - songwriter, background vocals
- Jean Baptiste – songwriter
- David Levy - vocal producer
- Dylan Dresdow – mixing
- Britney Spears – lead vocals, background vocals

== Charts ==
=== Weekly charts ===
Weekly chart performance for "Scream & Shout"
Chart (2012–13)	Peak position
Australia (ARIA)	2
Austria (Ö3 Austria Top 40)	1
Belgium (Ultratop 50 Flanders)	1
Belgium (Ultratop 50 Wallonia)	1
Bulgaria Airplay (BAMP)	1
Brazil (Brasil Hot 100 Airplay)	27
Brazil (Brasil Hot Pop Songs)	5
Canada Hot 100 (Billboard)	1
Croatia (HRT)	2
CIS Airplay (TopHit)	3
Czech Republic Airplay (ČNS IFPI)	2
Denmark (Tracklisten)	1
Euro Digital Song Sales (Billboard)	1
Finland (Suomen virallinen lista)	1
France (SNEP)	1
Germany (GfK)	1
Global Dance Tracks (Billboard)	1
Greece Digital Songs (Billboard)	1
Hungary (Dance Top 40)	5
Hungary (Rádiós Top 40)	2
Ireland (IRMA)	1
Israel International Airplay (Media Forest)	1
Italy (FIMI)	1
Italian Airplay (EarOne)	4
Japan Hot 100 (Billboard)	43
Lebanon (The Official Lebanese Top 20)	1
Luxembourg (Billboard)	1
Mexico (Billboard Ingles Airplay)	1
Mexico Anglo (Monitor Latino)	3
Netherlands (Dutch Top 40)	1
Netherlands (Single Top 100)	1
New Zealand (Recorded Music NZ)	1
Norway (VG-lista)	1
Poland Airplay (ZPAV)	5
Poland Dance (ZPAV)	4
Portugal Digital Songs (Billboard)	7
Romania (Airplay 100)	63
Russia (Billboard Hot 50 Airplay)	2
Russia Airplay (TopHit)	3
Scottish Singles Sales (Official Charts)	1
Slovakia Airplay (ČNS IFPI)	2
South Korea International Singles (Gaon)	4
Spain (PROMUSICAE)	1
Sweden (Sverigetopplistan)	2
Switzerland (Schweizer Hitparade)	1
Ukraine Airplay (TopHit)	33
UK Radio Airplay (Nielsen Soundscan)	5
UK Singles (Official Charts)	1 (Note: The UK Singles Chart peak position was for a sales-only chart. The Streaming chart was around since 2012, but its data was not incorporated into the Singles Chart until July 2014.)
UK Streaming (Official Charts)	1
UK TV Airplay (Nielsen Soundscan)	1
UK Hip Hop/R&B (Official Charts)	1
US Billboard Hot 100	3
US Adult Pop Airplay (Billboard)	23
US Dance Club Songs (Billboard)	3
US Hot Dance/Electronic Songs (Billboard)	1
US Pop Airplay (Billboard)	3
US Hot R&B/Hip-Hop Songs (Billboard)	49
US Rhythmic Airplay (Billboard)	4
Venezuela Pop/Rock (Record Report)	1

=== Monthly charts ===
Chart (2013)	Peak position
CIS (TopHit)	4
Russia Airplay (TopHit)	5
South Korea Foreign (Circle)	15
Ukraine Airplay (TopHit)	54

=== Year-end charts ===
2012 year-end chart performance for "Scream & Shout"
Chart (2012)	Position
Australia (ARIA)	47
France (SNEP)	47
Italy (FIMI)	88
South Korea (Gaon International Chart)	170
UK Singles (OCC)	78

2013 year-end chart performance for "Scream & Shout"
Chart (2013)	Position
Argentina International Digital Sales (CAPIF)	9
Australia (ARIA)	27
Austria (Ö3 Austria Top 40)	3
Belgium (Flanders Ultratop 50)	8
Belgium (Wallonia Ultratop 50)	4
Brazil (Crowley Broadcast Analysis)	58
Canada (Canadian Hot 100)	8
CIS (TopHit)	38
Denmark (Tracklisten)	25
Finland (Suomen virallinen lista)	12
France (SNEP)	13
Germany (Media Control AG)	3
Hungary (Dance Top 40)	16
Hungary (Rádiós Top 40)	87
Ireland (IRMA)	12
Italy (FIMI)	6
Mexico (Monitor Latino)	37
Moldova (Media Forest)	23
Netherlands (Dutch Top 40)	15
Netherlands (Single Top 100)	9
New Zealand (Recorded Music NZ)	22
Russia Airplay (TopHit)	26
South Korea (Gaon International Chart)	164
Spain (PROMUSICAE)	9
Sweden (Sverigetopplistan)	10
Switzerland (Schweizer Hitparade)	6
Ukraine Airplay (TopHit)	85
UK Singles (OCC)	18
US Billboard Hot 100	23
US Dance Club Songs (Billboard)	9
US Hot Dance/Electronic Songs (Billboard)	6
US Mainstream Top 40 (Billboard)	22
US Rhythmic (Billboard)	24

2014 year-end chart performance for "Scream & Shout"
Chart (2014)	Position
Hungary (Dance Top 40)	92

=== Decade-end charts ===
2010s-end chart performance for "Scream & Shout"
Chart (2010–2019)	Position
US Hot Dance/Electronic Songs (Billboard)	45

== Certifications and sales ==
Certifications and sales for "Scream & Shout"
Region	Certification	Certified units/sales
Australia (ARIA)	6× Platinum	420,000^{^}
Austria (IFPI Austria)	Platinum	30,000^{*}
Belgium (BRMA)	2× Platinum	60,000^{*}
Brazil (Pro-Música Brasil)	Diamond	250,000^{‡}
Denmark (IFPI Danmark)	Platinum	30,000^{^}
France (SNEP)	Platinum	150,000^{*}
Germany (BVMI)	4× Platinum	1,200,000^{‡}
Italy (FIMI)	4× Platinum	120,000^{‡}
Mexico (AMPROFON)	2× Platinum+Gold	150,000^{*}
New Zealand (RMNZ)	3× Platinum	45,000^{*}
Spain (Promusicae) 2015 onwards	Platinum	60,000^{‡}
Sweden (GLF)	3× Platinum	120,000^{‡}
Switzerland (IFPI Switzerland)	2× Platinum	60,000^{^}
United Kingdom (BPI)	2× Platinum	1,300,000
United States (RIAA)	3× Platinum	3,000,000^{*}
Streaming
Denmark (IFPI Danmark)	3× Platinum	5,400,000^{†}
Summaries
Worldwide (IFPI)	—	8,100,000
^{*} Sales figures based on certification alone.^{^} Shipments figures based on certification alone.^{‡} Sales+streaming figures based on certification alone.^{†} Streaming-only figures based on certification alone.

== Release history ==
Release dates and formats for "Scream & Shout"
Region	Date	Format(s)	Version	Label	Ref.
Canada	November 20, 2012	Digital download	Original	Universal	
United States	November 20, 2012	Digital download	Original	Interscope	
Australia	November 21, 2012	Digital download	Original	Universal	
Austria	November 21, 2012	Digital download	Original	Universal	
Belgium	November 21, 2012	Digital download	Original	Universal	
Denmark	November 21, 2012	Digital download	Original	Universal	
Finland	November 21, 2012	Digital download	Original	Universal	
France	November 21, 2012	Digital download	Original	Universal	
Ireland	November 21, 2012	Digital download	Original	Universal	
Italy	November 21, 2012	Digital download	Original	Universal	
Japan	November 21, 2012	Digital download	Original	Universal	
Netherlands	November 21, 2012	Digital download	Original	Universal	
New Zealand	November 21, 2012	Digital download	Original	Universal	
Spain	November 21, 2012	Digital download	Original	Universal	
Switzerland	November 21, 2012	Digital download	Original	Universal	
France	November 23, 2012	Radio airplay	Original	Universal	
Italy	November 23, 2012	Radio airplay	Original	Universal	
United States	November 27, 2012	Contemporary hit radio; rhythmic contemporary radio	Original	Interscope	
Germany	November 28, 2012	Digital download	Original	Universal	
United Kingdom	November 28, 2012	Digital download	Original	Polydor	
Germany	January 11, 2013	CD	Original	Universal	
Canada	January 29, 2013	Digital download	Remix	Universal	
United States	January 29, 2013	Digital download	Remix	Interscope	
Brazil	February 6, 2013	Digital download	Remix	Universal	

== See also ==
- List of Ultratop 50 number-one singles of 2012
- List of Ultratop 50 number-one singles of 2013
- List of Ultratop 40 number-one singles of 2013
- List of Hot 100 number-one singles of 2013 (Canada)
- List of number-one hits of 2013 (Denmark)
- List of number-one hits of 2013 (France)
- List of number-one hits of 2013 (Germany)
- List of number-one singles of 2013 (Ireland)
- List of number-one hits of 2012 (Italy)
- List of Dutch Top 40 number-one singles of 2013
- List of number-one songs in Norway (2013)
- List of number-one singles from the 2010s (New Zealand)
- List of Scottish Singles Chart number ones (2013)
- List of number-one hits of 2013 (Switzerland)
- List of UK Singles Chart number ones of the 2010s
- List of number-one Dance/Electronic Songs of 2013 (U.S.)
