= Solar Power Tour =

2022–23 concert tour by Lorde

- Tour by Lorde
- Location: Europe; Latin America; North America; Oceania
- Associated album: Solar Power
- Start date: 3 April 2022
- End date: 19 August 2023
- Legs: 5
- No. of shows: 30 in Europe; 27 in North America; 15 in Oceania; 7 in Latin America; 79 in total

Lorde concert chronology
- Melodrama World Tour (2017–18); Solar Power Tour (2022–23); Ultrasound World Tour (2025–26)

The Solar Power Tour was the third concert tour by New Zealand singer-songwriter Lorde, in support of her third studio album Solar Power (2021). The tour started on April 3, 2022, at the Grand Ole Opry House in Nashville, and concluded on August 19, 2023, at the Praia Fluvial do Taboão in Paredes de Coura, spanning over 70 shows in North America, Europe, Latin America and Oceania.

The show consisted of three segments and an encore, with two or three costume changes. The set list changed frequently as the tour went on, but consistently featured songs from all three of her studio albums, and occasionally included covers.

== Background ==
The Primavera Sound setlist for their 2022 festival was revealed on 25 May 2021, which included Lorde as a headliner. The dates for the Solar Power Tour were announced alongside the tracklist and release date of Solar Power on 21 June 2021. Lorde offered presale tickets for her fans subscribed to her mailing list, with presale tickets available from 24 June 2021 in North America and Europe, and 30 June 2021 in Australia and New Zealand. The general sale opened in North America and Europe on 25 June 2021, and in Australia and New Zealand on 5 July 2021. Taranaki Daily News reported that prices for her concert in New Plymouth started from NZ$89.90 plus fees.

On 24 May 2022, shows for Mexico were added, including Mexico City, Monterrey and Guadalajara. Lorde announced the shows via email with a presale code for fans. A second show for Mexico City was added on June 1, at Pepsi Center WTC, scheduled for October 11 and 12. The show in Monterrey is part of the Tecate Live Out Festival. Lorde also announced plans to play a different setlist of the tour in the Mexico shows.

On 25 June 2021, after her two London shows sold out instantly, Lorde added two new dates in London, with a third show in the Roundhouse Theatre scheduled for 3 June 2022, and another performance to close out the tour on 28 June 2022 at Alexandra Palace. A second show was added in Šibenik on the same day, with Croatia Week reporting that tickets for her first show sold out in 3 seconds. Additional shows were also added in Toronto, Boston, New York, Chicago, and Los Angeles. On 1 July 2021, two additional shows were added in Australia, after "overwhelming demand", with one show each added in Melbourne and Sydney.

It was announced on 10 November 2021 that the Australasian leg of the Solar Power Tour would be postponed to 2023. Lorde said of the decision that "touring internationally through a Covid outbreak has a ton of unforeseen moving parts, and I'd much rather play for you when we're all confident it will go smoothly", and promoters Frontier Touring said that the tour was initially scheduled with the expectation that there would be no restrictions on quarantine and that the borders of Australia and New Zealand would be open to non-citizens. New shows in Lower Hutt, Brisbane, and Perth were also announced.

== Setlist ==
This set list is representative of the show on 20 April 2022, in Philadelphia. It is not representative of all concerts for the duration of the tour.

1. "Leader of a New Regime"
2. "Homemade Dynamite"
3. "Buzzcut Season"
4. "Stoned at the Nail Salon"
5. "Fallen Fruit"
6. "The Path"
7. "California"
8. "Ribs"
9. "The Louvre"
10. "Dominoes"
11. "Loveless"
12. "Liability"
13. "Secrets from a Girl (Who’s Seen It All)"
14. "Mood Ring"
15. "Sober"
16. "Supercut"
17. "Perfect Places"
18. "Solar Power"
19. "Green Light"
20. "Oceanic Feeling"

Encore

21. "400 Lux"
22. "Royals"
23. "Team"

== Tour dates ==
List of scheduled concerts, showing date, city, country, and venue and opening acts
Date	City	Country	Venue	Opening act
North America
3 April 2022	Nashville	United States	Grand Ole Opry House	Remi Wolf
5 April 2022	Detroit	United States	Masonic Temple Theatre	Remi Wolf
7 April 2022	Montreal	Canada	Salle Wilfrid-Pelletier	Remi Wolf
8 April 2022	Toronto	Canada	Meridian Hall	Remi Wolf
9 April 2022	Toronto	Canada	Meridian Hall	Remi Wolf
12 April 2022	Boston	United States	Wang Theatre	Remi Wolf
13 April 2022	Boston	United States	Wang Theatre	Remi Wolf
18 April 2022	New York City	United States	Radio City Music Hall	Remi Wolf
19 April 2022	New York City	United States	Radio City Music Hall	Remi Wolf
20 April 2022	Philadelphia	United States	The Met Philadelphia	Remi Wolf
22 April 2022	Chicago	United States	Chicago Theatre	Remi Wolf
23 April 2022	Chicago	United States	Chicago Theatre	Remi Wolf
25 April 2022	Minneapolis	United States	The Armory	Remi Wolf
27 April 2022	Denver	United States	Mission Ballroom	Remi Wolf
30 April 2022	Seattle	United States	WaMu Theater	Remi Wolf
1 May 2022	Portland	United States	Theater of the Clouds	Remi Wolf
3 May 2022	San Francisco	United States	Bill Graham Civic Auditorium	Remi Wolf
5 May 2022	Los Angeles	United States	Shrine Auditorium	Remi Wolf
6 May 2022	Los Angeles	United States	Shrine Auditorium	Remi Wolf
7 May 2022	Santa Barbara	United States	Santa Barbara Bowl	Remi Wolf
Europe
25 May 2022	Leeds	United Kingdom	O_{2} Academy Leeds	Marlon Williams
26 May 2022	Edinburgh	United Kingdom	Usher Hall	Marlon Williams
28 May 2022	Manchester	United Kingdom	O_{2} Victoria Warehouse	Marlon Williams
29 May 2022 (Note: This concert is part of BBC Radio 1's Big Weekend.)	Coventry	United Kingdom	Memorial Park	—N/a
30 May 2022	Birmingham	United Kingdom	O_{2} Academy Birmingham	Marlon Williams
1 June 2022	London	United Kingdom	Roundhouse	Marlon Williams
2 June 2022	London	United Kingdom	Roundhouse	Marlon Williams
3 June 2022	London	United Kingdom	Roundhouse	Marlon Williams
5 June 2022 (Note: This concert is part of the Forbidden Fruit Festival.)	Dublin	Ireland	Royal Hospital Kilmainham	—N/a
7 June 2022	Paris	France	Casino de Paris	Marlon Williams
8 June 2022	Amsterdam	Netherlands	AFAS Live	Marlon Williams
10 June 2022 (Note: This concert is a part of Primavera Sound.)	Barcelona	Spain	Parc del Fòrum	—N/a
13 June 2022	Zürich	Switzerland	Halle 622	Marlon Williams
14 June 2022	Munich	Germany	Zenith	Marlon Williams
16 June 2022 (Note: This concert is a part of Roma Summer Fest.)	Rome	Italy	Cavea Amphitheater	—N/a
17 June 2022	Villafranca di Verona	Italy	Castello Scaligero	Marlon Williams
18 June 2022	Šibenik	Croatia	St. Michael's Fortress	Marlon Williams
19 June 2022	Šibenik	Croatia	St. Michael's Fortress	Marlon Williams
21 June 2022	Cologne	Germany	Open-Air-Gelände	Marlon Williams
23 June 2022	Berlin	Germany	Verti Music Hall	Marlon Williams
26 June 2022 (Note: This concert is a part of Glastonbury Festival.)	Pilton	United Kingdom	Worthy Farm	—N/a
28 June 2022	London	United Kingdom	Alexandra Palace	Marlon Williams
1 July 2022	Oslo	Norway	Sentrum Scene	Emilie Adams
3 July 2022 (Note: This concert is a part of Lollapalooza Stockholm.)	Stockholm	Sweden	Gärdet	-
North America
25 August 2022 (Note: The concert in Uncasville on 25 August 2022 was originally scheduled to be on 15 April 2022, however due to illness the show was postponed.)	Uncasville	United States	Mohegan Sun Arena	Jim-E Stack
27 August 2022 (Note: This concert is a part of Wonderbus Music & Arts Festival.)	Columbus	United States	The Lawn at CAS	—N/a
29 August 2022 (Note: The concert in Washington, D.C. on 29 August 2022 was originally scheduled to be on 16 April 2022, however due to illness the show was postponed.)	Washington, D.C.	United States	The Anthem	Jim-E Stack
16 September 2022 (Note: This concert is a part of Primavera Sound Los Angeles.)	Los Angeles	United States	LA State Historic Park	—N/a
17 September 2022 (Note: This concert is a part of Life Is Beautiful.)	Las Vegas	United States	Downtown Las Vegas	—N/a
18 September 2022 (Note: This concert is a part of Rifflandia Music Festival.)	Victoria	Canada	Royal Athletic Park	—N/a
1 October 2022 (Note: This concert is a part of All Things Go Music Festival.)	Columbia	United States	Merriweather Post Pavilion	—N/a
Latin America
11 October 2022	Mexico City	Mexico	Pepsi Center WTC	Cautious Clay; Elsa y Elmar
12 October 2022	Mexico City	Mexico	Pepsi Center WTC	Cautious Clay; Elsa y Elmar
14 October 2022	Zapopan	Mexico	Telmex Auditorium	Cautious Clay; Elsa y Elmar
15 October 2022 (Note: This concert is a part of Tecate Live Out.)	Monterrey	Mexico	Fundidora Park	—N/a
6 November 2022 (Note: This concert is a part of Primavera Sound Sao Paulo.)	São Paulo	Brazil	Anhembi Convention Center	—N/a
8 November 2022	Rio de Janeiro	Brazil	Vivo Rio	Japanese Breakfast
12 November 2022 (Note: This concert is a part of Primavera Sound Santiago.)	Santiago	Chile	Parque Bicentenario Cerrillos	—N/a
13 November 2022 (Note: This concert is a part of Primavera Sound Buenos Aires)	Buenos Aires	Argentina	Costanera Sur	—N/a
Oceania
21 February 2023 (Note: The concert in Wellington on 21 February 2023 was originally scheduled to be on 1 March 2022 at Days Bay in Lower Hutt. However, due to the COVID-19 pandemic, the show was postponed. Cyclone Gabrielle forced a last-minute venue change to Wellington.)	Wellington	New Zealand	TSB Bank Arena	Fazerdaze and Riiki Reid
22 February 2023	Wellington	New Zealand	TSB Bank Arena	Fazerdaze and Riiki Reid
24 February 2023 (Note: Relief concert held in the aftermath of Cyclone Gabrielle)	Christchurch	New Zealand	Christchurch Town Hall	—N/a
25 February 2023 (Note: This concert is a part of the Electric Avenue Festival.)	Christchurch	New Zealand	Hagley Park	—N/a
27 February 2023 (Note: The concert in Upper Moutere on 27 February 2023 was originally scheduled to be on 27 February 2022, however due to the COVID-19 pandemic the show was postponed.)	Upper Moutere	New Zealand	Neudorf Vineyards	Fazerdaze and Riiki Reid
4 March 2023 (Note: The concert in Auckland on 4 March 2023 was originally scheduled to be on 5 March 2022, however due to the COVID-19 pandemic the show was postponed.)	Auckland	New Zealand	The Outer Fields at Western Springs	Marlon Williams, Fazerdaze, and Riiki Reid
8 March 2023 (Note: The concert in Brisbane on 8 March 2023 was originally scheduled to be on 10 March 2022, however due to the COVID-19 pandemic the show was postponed.)	Brisbane	Australia	Riverstage	MUNA
10 March 2023 (Note: The concerts in Melbourne on 10 March and 11 March 2023 were originally scheduled to be on 13 March and 12 March 2022, however due to the COVID-19 pandemic the show was postponed.)	Melbourne	Australia	Sidney Myer Music Bowl	MUNA
11 March 2023	Melbourne	Australia	Sidney Myer Music Bowl	MUNA
13 March 2023 (Note: The concerts in Sydney on 13 March and 14 March 2023 were originally scheduled to be on 16 March and 15 March 2022, however due to the COVID-19 pandemic the show was postponed.)	Sydney	Australia	Aware Super Theatre	MUNA
14 March 2023	Sydney	Australia	Aware Super Theatre	MUNA
16 March 2023 (Note: This concert is a part of the Adelaide Festival.)	Adelaide	Australia	Adelaide Entertainment Centre	MUNA and Stellie
18 March 2023 (Note: The concert in Perth on 18 March 2023 was originally scheduled to be on 19 March 2022, however due to the COVID-19 pandemic the show was postponed.)	Perth	Australia	Belvoir Amphitheatre	Laura Jean
20 April 2023 (Note: The concerts in Hastings on 20 and 21 April 2023 were originally scheduled to be on 1 and 2 March 2022, however due to the COVID-19 pandemic the shows were postponed.)	Hastings	New Zealand	Black Barn Amphitheatre	Riiki Reid, BROODS, Fazerdaze
21 April 2023	Hastings	New Zealand	Black Barn Amphitheatre	Riiki Reid, BROODS, Fazerdaze

== Night Vision extension ==
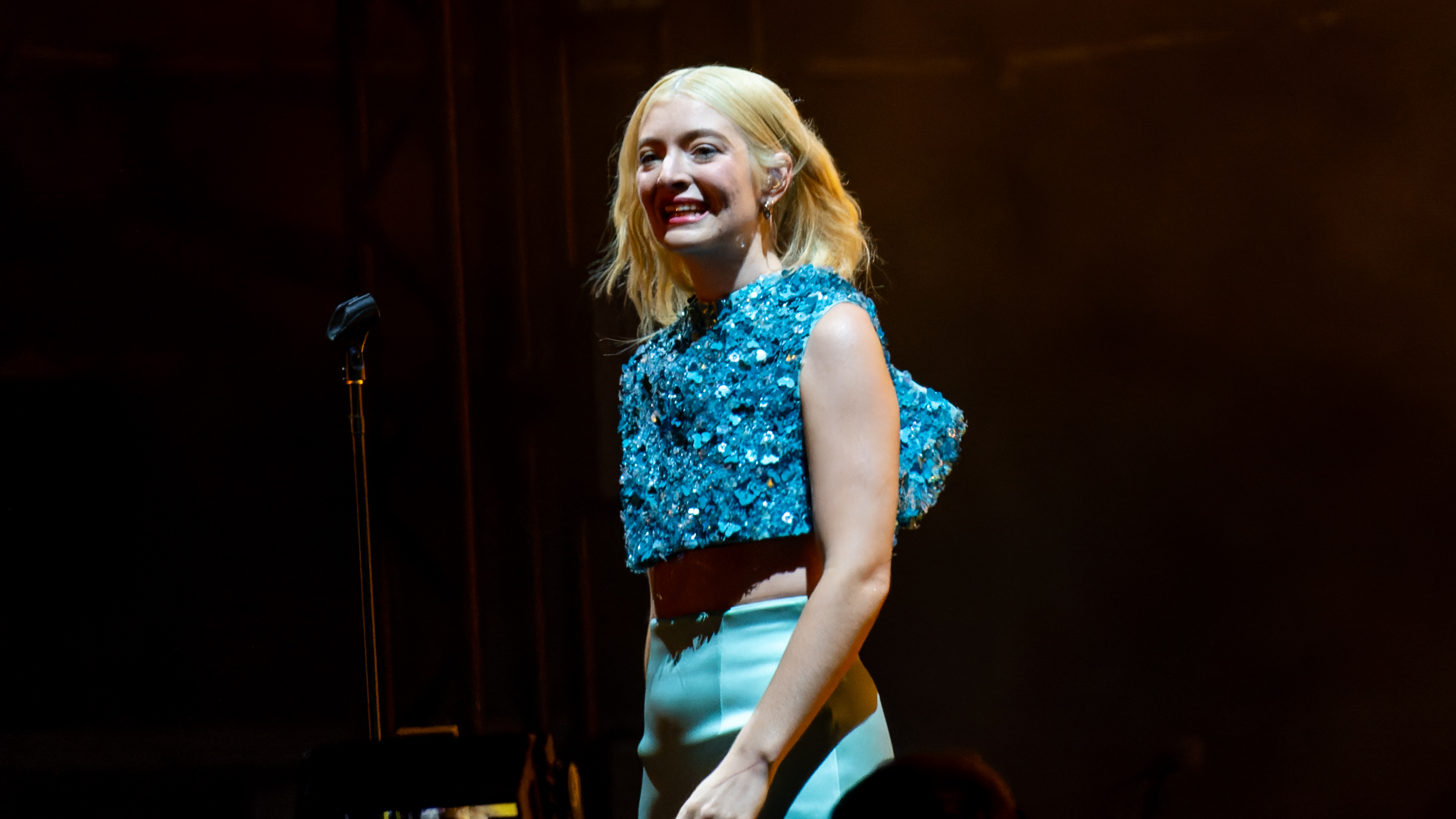
Lorde at Boardmasters Festival in 2023

The Night Vision was an extension of the Solar Power Tour based on festivals through Europe, marking Lorde's first festival-only tour. It began in County Waterford, Ireland, on August 6, 2023, and concluded on August 19 of the same year in Paredes de Coura, Portugal, with a total of 6 festival stops.

List of concerts, showing date, city, country, venue and festival
Date (2023)	City	Country	Venue	Festival
6 August	County Waterford	Ireland	Curraghmore	All Together Now
9 August	Oslo	Norway	Tøyen Park	Øya
11 August	Newquay	England	Watergate Bay	Boardmasters
12 August	Helsinki	Finland	Suvilahti	Flow
14 August	Budapest	Hungary	Óbudai-Sziget	Sziget
19 August	Paredes de Coura	Portugal	Praia Fluvial do Taboão	Paredes de Coura
