= List of Ultratop 50 number-one singles of 2013 =

These hits topped the Ultratop 50 in 2013.

Flanders
Issue date	Song	Artist
5 January	"Scream & Shout"	will.i.am featuring Britney Spears
12 January	"Scream & Shout"	will.i.am featuring Britney Spears
19 January	"Scream & Shout"	will.i.am featuring Britney Spears
26 January	"Scream & Shout"	will.i.am featuring Britney Spears
2 February	"Scream & Shout"	will.i.am featuring Britney Spears
9 February	"Scream & Shout"	will.i.am featuring Britney Spears
16 February	"Scream & Shout"	will.i.am featuring Britney Spears
23 February	"Thrift Shop"	Macklemore & Ryan Lewis featuring Wanz
2 March	"Thrift Shop"	Macklemore & Ryan Lewis featuring Wanz
9 March	"Thrift Shop"	Macklemore & Ryan Lewis featuring Wanz
16 March	"Thrift Shop"	Macklemore & Ryan Lewis featuring Wanz
23 March	"Thrift Shop"	Macklemore & Ryan Lewis featuring Wanz
30 March	"Thrift Shop"	Macklemore & Ryan Lewis featuring Wanz
6 April	"Another Love"	Tom Odell
13 April	"Another Love"	Tom Odell
20 April	"Thrift Shop"	Macklemore and Ryan Lewis featuring Wanz
27 April	"Get Lucky"	Daft Punk featuring Pharrell Williams
4 May	"Get Lucky"	Daft Punk featuring Pharrell Williams
11 May	"Get Lucky"	Daft Punk featuring Pharrell Williams
18 May	"Get Lucky"	Daft Punk featuring Pharrell Williams
25 May	"Get Lucky"	Daft Punk featuring Pharrell Williams
1 June	"Get Lucky"	Daft Punk featuring Pharrell Williams
8 June	"Dat ik je mis"	Maaike Ouboter
15 June	"Blurred Lines"	Robin Thicke featuring T.I. and Pharrell
22 June	"Blurred Lines"	Robin Thicke featuring T.I. and Pharrell
29 June	"Blurred Lines"	Robin Thicke featuring T.I. and Pharrell
6 July	"Formidable"	Stromae
13 July	"Wake Me Up"	Avicii
20 July	"Wake Me Up"	Avicii
27 July	"Wake Me Up"	Avicii
3 August	"Wake Me Up"	Avicii
10 August	"Wake Me Up"	Avicii
17 August	"Animals"	Martin Garrix
24 August	"Animals"	Martin Garrix
31 August	"Animals"	Martin Garrix
7 September	"Animals"	Martin Garrix
14 September	"Animals"	Martin Garrix
21 September	"Animals"	Martin Garrix
28 September	"Animals"	Martin Garrix
5 October	"Animals"	Martin Garrix
12 October	"Vliegtuig"	Clouseau
19 October	"Animals"	Martin Garrix
26 October	"Talk Dirty"	Jason Derulo featuring 2 Chainz
2 November	"Tsunami"	DVBBS and Borgeous
9 November	"Royals"	Lorde
16 November	"Royals"	Lorde
23 November	"Royals"	Lorde
30 November	"Royals"	Lorde
7 December	"Royals"	Lorde
14 December	"Samen voor altijd"	Marco Borsato and Jada Borsato featuring Willem Frederiks, Lange Frans, Day Ewbank and John Ewbank
21 December	"Samen voor altijd"	Marco Borsato and Jada Borsato featuring Willem Frederiks, Lange Frans, Day Ewbank and John Ewbank
28 December	"Samen voor altijd"	Marco Borsato and Jada Borsato featuring Willem Frederiks, Lange Frans, Day Ewbank and John Ewbank

Ranking of most weeks at number 1

Position	Artist	Weeks #1
1	Pharrell Williams	9
1	Martin Garrix	9
2	Britney Spears	7
2	will.i.am	7
2	Macklemore & Ryan Lewis	7
2	Wanz	7
3	Daft Punk	6
4	Avicii	5
4	Lorde	5
5	Marco Borsato	3
5	Lange Frans	3
5	Robin Thicke	3
5	T.I.	3
6	Tom Odell	2
7	Clouseau	1
7	2 Chainz	1
7	Jada Borsato	1
7	Jason Derulo	1
7	Stromae	1
7	DVBBS	1
7	Borgeous	1
7	Maaike Ouboter	1

Wallonia
Issue date	Song	Artist
5 January	"Gangnam Style"	Psy
12 January	"Gangnam Style"	Psy
19 January	"Scream & Shout"	will.i.am & Britney Spears
26 January	"Scream & Shout"	will.i.am & Britney Spears
2 February	"Scream & Shout"	will.i.am & Britney Spears
9 February	"Scream & Shout"	will.i.am & Britney Spears
16 February	"Scream & Shout"	will.i.am & Britney Spears
23 February	"Thrift Shop"	Macklemore & Ryan Lewis featuring Wanz
2 March	"Thrift Shop"	Macklemore & Ryan Lewis featuring Wanz
9 March	"Thrift Shop"	Macklemore & Ryan Lewis featuring Wanz
16 March	"Thrift Shop"	Macklemore & Ryan Lewis featuring Wanz
23 March	"Thrift Shop"	Macklemore & Ryan Lewis featuring Wanz
30 March	"Thrift Shop"	Macklemore & Ryan Lewis featuring Wanz
6 April	"Thrift Shop"	Macklemore & Ryan Lewis featuring Wanz
13 April	"Thrift Shop"	Macklemore & Ryan Lewis featuring Wanz
20 April	"J'me tire"	Maître Gims
27 April	"Get Lucky"	Daft Punk featuring Pharrell Williams
4 May	"Get Lucky"	Daft Punk featuring Pharrell Williams
11 May	"Get Lucky"	Daft Punk featuring Pharrell Williams
18 May	"Get Lucky"	Daft Punk featuring Pharrell Williams
25 May	"Get Lucky"	Daft Punk featuring Pharrell Williams
1 June	"Get Lucky"	Daft Punk featuring Pharrell Williams
8 June	"Get Lucky"	Daft Punk featuring Pharrell Williams
15 June	"Formidable"	Stromae
22 June	"Formidable"	Stromae
29 June	"Formidable"	Stromae
6 July	"Formidable"	Stromae
13 July	"Formidable"	Stromae
20 July	"Formidable"	Stromae
27 July	"Formidable"	Stromae
3 August	"Papaoutai"	Stromae
10 August	"Papaoutai"	Stromae
17 August	"Wake Me Up"	Avicii
24 August	"Papaoutai"	Stromae
31 August	"Animals"	Martin Garrix
7 September	"Animals"	Martin Garrix
14 September	"Animals"	Martin Garrix
21 September	"Animals"	Martin Garrix
28 September	"Animals"	Martin Garrix
5 October	"Animals"	Martin Garrix
12 October	"Animals"	Martin Garrix
19 October	"Animals"	Martin Garrix
26 October	"Animals"	Martin Garrix
2 November	"Animals"	Martin Garrix
9 November	"Animals"	Martin Garrix
16 November	"Tsunami"	DVBBS and Borgeous
23 November	"Royals"	Lorde
30 November	"Tous les mêmes"	Stromae
7 December	"Tous les mêmes"	Stromae
14 December	"Tous les mêmes"	Stromae
21 December	"Hey Brother"	Avicii
28 December	"Tous les mêmes"	Stromae

Ranking of most weeks at number 1

Position	Artist	Weeks #1
1	Stromae	14
2	Martin Garrix	11
3	Macklemore & Ryan Lewis	8
3	Wanz	8
4	Daft Punk	7
4	Pharrell Williams	7
5	Britney Spears	5
5	will.i.am	5
6	Avicii	2
6	Psy	2
7	Lorde	1
7	Maître Gims	1
7	DVBBS	1
7	Borgeous	1

== See also ==
- 2013 in music
