= Ribs (song) =

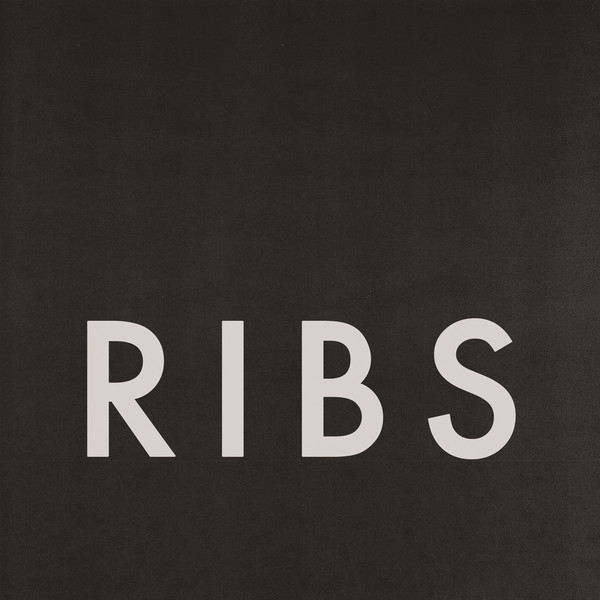

Promotional single by Lorde

from the album Pure Heroine
- Released: 30 September 2013
- Recorded: 2013
- Studio: Golden Age Studios (Auckland)
- Genre: Electronica; indietronica; electropop
- Length: 4:18
- Label: UMG
- Songwriters: Ella Yelich-O'Connor; Joel Little
- Producer: Little

"Ribs" is a song by New Zealand singer-songwriter Lorde, from her debut studio album Pure Heroine (2013). Universal Music Group (UMG) released it as a promotional single on 30 September 2013. Written and produced by Lorde and Joel Little, "Ribs" is an electronica, indietronica and electropop song discussing Lorde's stress over aging.

Music critics met "Ribs" with acclaim; most have praised its lyrical content, and the song has consistently ranked among Lorde's best songs. Commercially, the track appeared on record charts in Australia, New Zealand, the United Kingdom and the United States. Lorde has performed the song on numerous occasions, including on the Late Show with David Letterman, and on her Pure Heroine (2014), Melodrama (2017-18), Solar Power (2022-23) and Ultrasound (2025-26) concert tours. After the release of "What Was That" in 2025, the track began to resurge in popularity and enter various charts for the first time.

== Production and composition ==
"Ribs" was written by Lorde—credited under her birth-name Ella Yelich-O'Connor—and Joel Little who also handled production, engineering, instrumentation and mixing. It was recorded at Little's Golden Age Studios in Auckland, New Zealand. On 30 September 2013, Universal Music issued "Ribs" as a promotional single on the iTunes Store.

"Ribs"
A 25-second sample of "Ribs", a deep house-influenced electronica, indietronica and electropop song.

Lorde said ageing, which she described as "a big stress" of hers, and "this big party I had when my parents went away" inspired her. "Ribs" was written on the day of the January 2013 Auckland Laneway Festival.

"Ribs" is composed in the key of E major with a tempo of 128 beats per minute. Lorde's vocals span a range of B_{2} to G♯_{5} and its chord progression follows a sequence of A–E–F♯m_{7}–C♯m_{7}. "Ribs" is a deep house-influenced electronica, indietronica, and electropop song, which starts ambiently and, according to Jason Lipshutz of Billboard, features an "exhausted-sounding Lorde growing more frantic with each passing second," with lyrics that include the singer discovering her maturity and "grown-up problems." In "Ribs", she references Canadian indie rock band Broken Social Scene's 2002 song "Lover's Spit". Consequence of Sound noted how Lorde's minimal production allowed her to sing in any melody, layering them over one another to create a choral effect.

== Live performances ==
Lorde first performed "Ribs" and "400 Lux" at the Greenwich Village club Le Poisson Rouge. She also performed the song during a free concert on 7 September 2013 at the 50000 seat Vector Arena. On 24 September 2013, she performed the track at The Fonda Theatre in Los Angeles, California, and at a concert at the Warsaw in Brooklyn on 3 October 2013 along with other material from her album Pure Heroine. On 26 November 2013, Lorde performed the song on the Late Show with David Letterman, backed by a drummer and a keyboard player. Canadian producer Ryan Hemsworth remixed the track and released it under the subtitle "Let's Have a Sleepover Version". Lorde performed "Ribs" at the Coachella Valley Music Festival and other festivals in 2017, and on her debut Pure Heroine Tour (2013–2014); while a reworked version of the song was performed during the North American leg of her Melodrama World Tour (2017–2018). The track was also included in the set lists of the Solar Power (2022-2023) and Ultrasound (2025-2026) concert tours, for the latter of which it served as the final song.

== Reception ==
"Ribs" received favourable reviews from music critics on its release. Mike Wass of Idolator praised the song's "vulnerability" and called it an "obtuse offering". Lindsay Zoladz of Pitchfork opined that "Ribs" was the best song Lorde had written so far. Pretty Much Amazing wrote a mixed review of "Ribs", describing it as a song with "slower, driving beats" that go nowhere. While the publication praised its "dark and cold" chorus, it was also critical of the "same stacked vocals, hypnotic percussion, and synthesized production" that made the track repetitive. Evan Sawdey of PopMatters called it one of the album's highlights, with the lyrics describing a "specific mood and atmosphere". Sawdey also compared the "steady club beat" that plays "underneath her words" to that of a heartbeat. The A.V. Club called "Ribs" the "best illustration of [Lorde's] gift," while Jon Hadusek of Consequence of Sound placed it as one of the album's essential tracks in his review.

Since its release, the song has appeared in several critics' lists. In 2017, Billboard ranked "Ribs" at number 12 on their list of the 100 Best Deep Cuts by 21st Century Pop Stars. Tatiana Cirisano, a reporter for the publication, wrote that it remains the singer's "most poignant reflection on the anxieties—and small thrills—of growing up". Uproxx placed the track at number 95 on its list of the Best Songs of the 2010s.

Commercially, "Ribs" peaked at numbers 36 and 92 on the Australian and British streaming charts, and reached number 29 on the New Zealand singles chart. The single reached number 26 on the United States Billboard Hot Rock Songs chart. In 2020, the song experienced a resurgence in popularity driven by creators on the video-sharing app TikTok.

The song experienced another resurgence in 2025, after Lorde began to promote her new single "What Was That". While waiting for the singer to arrive at Washington Square Park to debut "What Was That", fans played "Ribs" on a speaker and danced and sung along. Lorde went on to post videos of this moment on Instagram. In an interview with Rolling Stone, the singer spoke about the resurgence of the track, saying "it’s crazy that it works on people still [...] it’s a mystery to me."

== Charts ==
=== Weekly charts ===
Chart (2013–2014)	Peak position
Australian Streaming Tracks (ARIA)	36
New Zealand (Recorded Music NZ)	29
UK Streaming (Official Streaming Chart)	92
US Hot Rock & Alternative Songs (Billboard)	26

Chart (2025)	Peak position
Australia (ARIA)	77
Canada Hot 100 (Billboard)	76
Ireland (IRMA)	16
Lithuania (AGATA)	88
Netherlands (Single Tip)	23
US Billboard Hot 100	99
US Hot Rock & Alternative Songs (Billboard)	12

=== Year-end charts ===
Chart (2025)	Position
US Hot Rock & Alternative Songs (Billboard)	75

== Certifications ==
Region	Certification	Certified units/sales
Australia (ARIA)	4× Platinum	280,000^{‡}
Austria (IFPI Austria)	Gold	15,000^{*}
Brazil (Pro-Música Brasil)	Gold	30,000^{‡}
Canada (Music Canada)	4× Platinum	320,000^{‡}
Denmark (IFPI Danmark)	Gold	45,000^{‡}
New Zealand (RMNZ)	4× Platinum	120,000^{‡}
United Kingdom (BPI)	Platinum	600,000^{‡}
United States (RIAA)	4× Platinum	4,000,000^{‡}
^{*} Sales figures based on certification alone.^{‡} Sales+streaming figures based on certification alone.
