= Riiki Reid =

New Zealand singer-songwriter

RIIKI REID
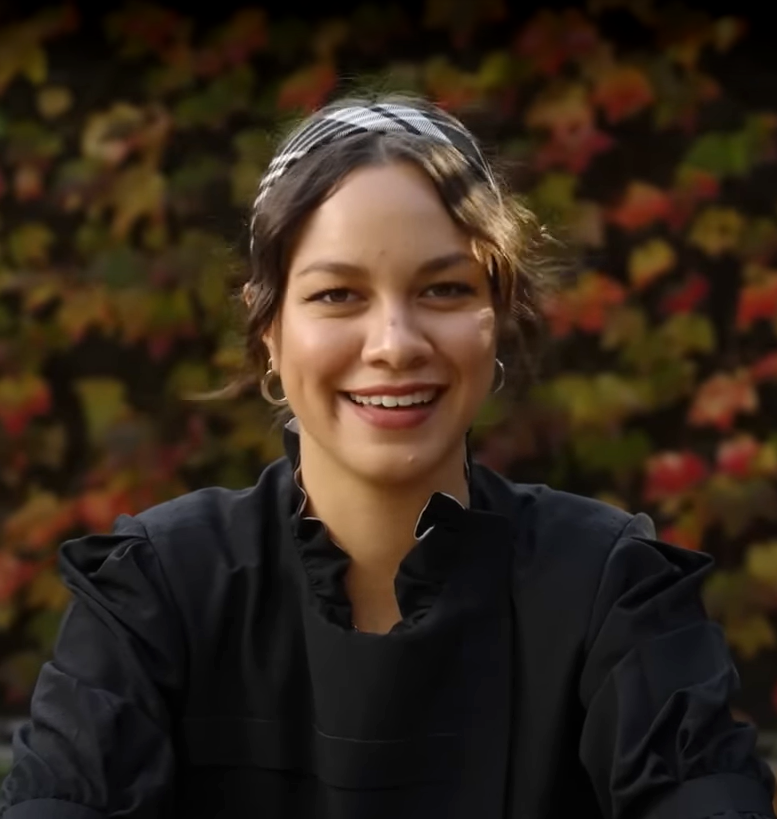
- Reid in 2022

Background information
- Also known as: Riiki (2019–2020)
- Born: Raquel Abolins-Reid; 1999 (age 26–27); Wellington, New Zealand
- Genres: Alternative pop, Dance, R&B
- Occupations: Singer-songwriter, producer, dance choreographer
- Years active: 2019–present
- Label: Warner Music (NZ, AU)
- Website: www.riikireid.com

Raquel Abolins-Reid (born 1999), known professionally as RIIKI REID (formerly Riiki), is a New Zealand singer-songwriter, producer and dance choreographer. Several of Reid's songs have charted highly in the NZ Hot Singles Charts, including Good times which reached number 1.

Reid released several singles from 2019 to 2021 independently, continuing her work with Warner Music New Zealand in subsequent years. In 2022 she released two EPs with the label, Newer Oxygen and Crash & Collide. She followed up with Skin, her third EP, in 2024.

In 2023, Reid and Fazerdaze toured as a supporting acts for Lorde's Solar Power concert in New Zealand. In 2024, she performed at Homegrown festival. Reid has also toured with other New Zealand acts including L.A.B. and Dave Dobbyn.

== Biography ==
Reid grew up in Churton Park, Wellington and was a student at Onslow College. She reached the finals in Smokefreerockquest with her highschool band Retrospect. Reid went on to study commercial music at Massey University in 2015, and graduated with a Bachelor of Commercial Music in 2022. During this time she worked as a dance teacher at Pump Dance Studios.

Reid is of Samoan, Latvian, Scottish and Māori (Ngāti Porou) descent. She recorded her first original composition in te reo Māori with "Kārewa" in 2023, and "Te Tāone", a re-imagining of the 2022 single "The City."

Reid describes herself as "primarily a vocalist" with an interest in piano and guitar. She claims a love of "edgy 90s rock" and cites Radiohead and Björk as inspirations.

Reid was seven years old when she performed for the first time in public, alongside her brother in North City Mall, Porirua.

== Career ==
=== 2019–2022: Newer Oxygen and Crash and Collide ===
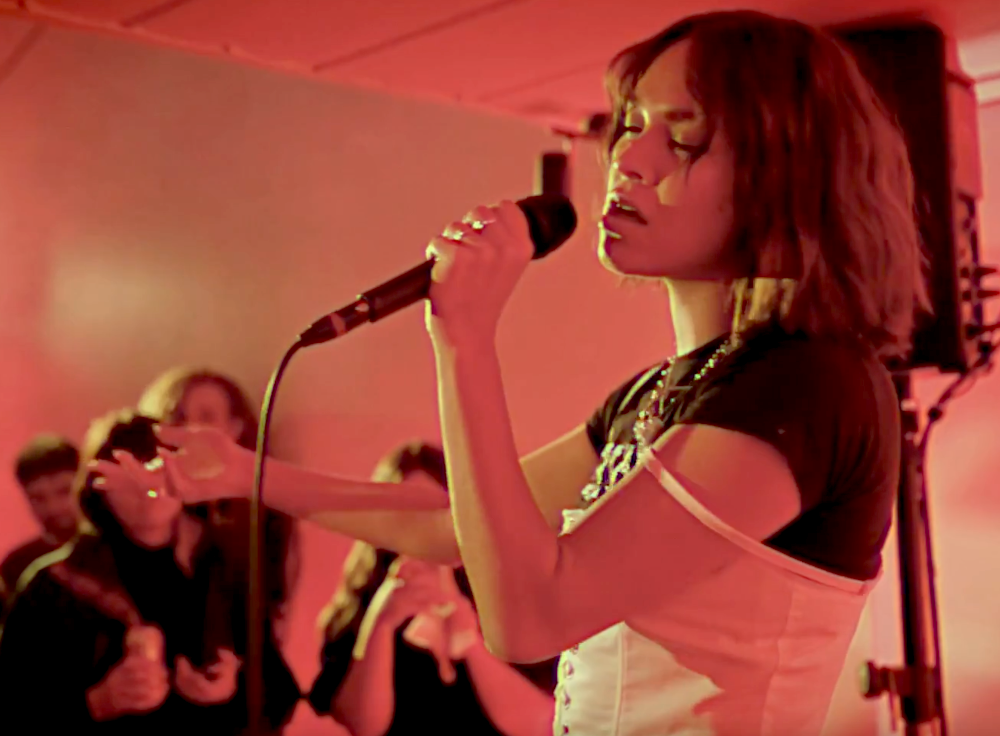
Reid in 2022 in a promotional performance for Newer Oxygen

In the late 2010s, Reid was teaching dance at Pump Dance Studios in Wellington, and was part of a hip-hop dance crew, while also studying commercial music at Massey University. In 2019, she recorded and produced the single "One Day", which was mixed and mastered at Roundhead Studios by sound engineer Simon Gooding. The release was accompanied by a music video Reid followed up with "High Heights" in 2019.

Reid was signed to talent agency WME in 2020 and briefly flew to Los Angeles on a "songwriting trip". However, her plans were briefly halted due to the COVID-19 lockdown, in which she ended her relationship with her then boyfriend at the peak of the pandemic. Reid has stated this period was a distressing time that affected her motivation. However, she returned with new material in mid-to-late 2020, she released two further singles: "Share Your Luv" and "Good Times". The latter single spent 3 weeks on the New Zealand "hot 40" charts, peaking at 9. She followed in 2021 with her fifth single, "In the Moment", released with a music video directed by Connor Pritchard and funded by NZ On Air.

In May 2022, Reid released her debut EP Newer Oxygen, which is a collection of three singles. This was soon followed by Crash & Collide, a second EP, released in November. That year, she toured in NZ and Australia with artists including Dave Dobbyn and L.A.B, and Budjerah on his Australia tour.

=== 2023–present: Skin and Drench ===
In 2023, Reid recorded her first original composition in te reo Māori with "Kārewa" in 2023, and "Te Tāone", a re-imagining of the 2022 single "The City." Reid began touring on Lorde's Solar Power Tour during the New Zealand leg, as an opening act along with Fazerdaze.

In 2024, Reid released her third EP, Skin. It was described as a pop ballad album, and the final in a trilogy of EP releases. Later that year, she performed at Homegrown Music Festival for the first time.

In October 2025, Reid released Drench, an alternative-pop EP with five tracks. Earlier in year, two singles from the EP had been released in advance: "Over Romantic" and "Indulgent (Fruit)". Reid wrote the songs while staying in Sydney and Auckland, and was inspired by themes of seasonal change and a "desire to escape New Zealand's winter" and go on an adventure.

== Discography ==
=== EPs ===
- Newer Oxygen (2022)
- Crash & Collide (2022)
- Skin (2024)
- Drench (2025)

=== Singles ===
- "One Day" (2019)
- "High Heights" (2019)
- "Share Your Luv" (2020)
- "Good Times" (2020)
- "In the Moment" (2021)
- "Meet U Again" (2022)
- "Karamata" (2022)
- "Drive" (2022)
- "The City" (2022)
- "Home With Me" (2023)
- "Te Tāone" (2023)
- "Kārewa" (2023)
- "Like You" featuring Balu Brigada (2024)
- "Over Romantic" (2025)
- "Indulgent (Fruit)" (2025)
