= Buzzcut Season =

Promotional single by Lorde

from the album Pure Heroine
- Released: 23 September 2013
- Studio: Golden Age Studios (Auckland)
- Genre: Electropop
- Length: 4:06
- Label: UMG
- Songwriters: Ella Yelich-O'Connor; Joel Little
- Producers: Joel Little; Ella Yelich-O'Connor

Audio video
- "Buzzcut Season" on YouTube

"Buzzcut Season" is a song by New Zealand singer-songwriter Lorde, taken from her debut studio album, Pure Heroine (2013). It was released on 23 September 2013 by Universal Music Group (UMG) as a promotional single from the album. Written by Lorde and Joel Little, "Buzzcut Season" is an electropop song that features elements from tropical music and discusses the "ridiculousness of modern life."

Upon its release, "Buzzcut Season" was met with positive reviews from music critics, who praised its production and Lorde's vocal delivery on the track. The song reached number twenty-nine on the US Billboard Hot Rock Songs and number thirty-eight on the ARIA Streaming Tracks. Lorde performed "Buzzcut Season" during a number of shows, including the Late Show with David Letterman. The song was also performed on the Pure Heroine (2013-14), Melodrama (2017-18), Solar Power (2022-23), and Ultrasound (2025-26) concert tours.

== Background and composition ==
"Buzzcut Season"
A 24-second sample of "Buzzcut Season", featuring xylophone instrumentation

"Buzzcut Season" was written by Lorde (credited under her birth-name Ella Yelich-O'Connor) and Joel Little, and was produced and mixed by Little. Similar to other songs from the album Pure Heroine, "Buzzcut Season" was recorded at Golden Age Studios in Auckland. On 23 September 2013, the track was released as a digital download promotional single on iTunes Stores by Universal Music New Zealand.

"Buzzcut Season" is an electropop song that draws inspirations from tropical music, and features percussion snaps and xylophone in its instrumentation. Lyrically, the song talks about the "ridiculousness of modern life." Sammy Maine from the website Drowned in Sound commented that the song was a "heartbreaking comment on our war-driven way of life." She pointed out the lyrics "Explosions on TV and all the girls with heads inside a dream" against M.I.A.'s pop-reggae musical style. Gaby Whitehill from Gigwise website called the song a "melancholy affair" and praised the "epic piano laden beat combined with the 16-year-old's haunting vocals."

== Reception and promotion ==
Jason Lipshutz from Billboard praised the song's production and Lorde's vocal delivery. Writer Michelle Pitiris for Vulture chose "Buzzcut Season" as a highlight from Pure Heroine and compared its sound to French electronic duo Air. Idolator editor Mike Wass labelled it "another twinkling postcard from the streets of Auckland" but felt that it failed to "capture the attention" like "400 Lux" or "Tennis Court", two other songs from the album. "Buzzcut Season" spent five weeks on the Australian ARIA Streaming Tracks chart, peaking at number thirty-eight. It also reached number 29 on the US Hot Rock Songs. In New Zealand, "Buzzcut Season" peaked at number 18 on the New Zealand National Singles chart, which lists the best-performing singles by New Zealand artists in the country.

On 3 October 2013, the singer held a concert at the Warsaw Venue in Brooklyn and performed the song among other tracks from the album. On 12 October 2013, Lorde performed "Buzzcut Season" in Studio Q of CBC. On 13 November 2013, Lorde performed several songs from Pure Heroine during the Late Show with David Letterman to promote the album, including "Buzzcut Season". According to Rolling Stone, the "sparkly-dressed" and "big-haired" singer performed only backed by a drummer and a keyboard player.

The track was included in the set lists for the Pure Heroine (2013-14), Melodrama (2017-18), Solar Power (2022-23), and Ultrasound (2025-26) concert tours.

== In popular culture ==
Singers Troye Sivan and Lauv reference the title of the song on their track "I'm So Tired..." (2019). Sivan stated in an interview with Paper that he and Lauv decided to include "Buzzcut Season" into the song's lyrics after having a discussion in his backyard about melancholic songs that uplifted the pair's emotions.

== Track listing ==
Digital download

1. "Buzzcut Season" – 4:06

== Charts ==
=== Weekly charts ===
Chart (2013)	Peak position
Australian Streaming Tracks (ARIA)	38
New Zealand National Singles (Recorded Music NZ)	18
UK Streaming (Official Streaming Chart)	72
US Hot Rock Songs (Billboard)	29

=== Year-end charts ===
Chart (2014)	Position
US Hot Rock Songs (Billboard)	93

== Certifications ==
Region	Certification	Certified units/sales
Australia (ARIA)	Platinum	70,000^{‡}
Brazil (Pro-Música Brasil)	Gold	30,000^{‡}
Canada (Music Canada)	Platinum	80,000^{‡}
New Zealand (RMNZ)	Platinum	30,000^{‡}
United Kingdom (BPI)	Silver	200,000^{‡}
United States (RIAA)	Platinum	1,000,000^{‡}
^{‡} Sales+streaming figures based on certification alone.
