= Green Light (Lorde song) =

2017 single by Lorde

- Chromeo Remix artwork

Single by Lorde

from the album Melodrama
- Released: 2 March 2017
- Recorded: 2016
- Studio: Electric Lady (Manhattan); Rough Customer (Brooklyn); Westlake (West Hollywood)
- Genre: Electropop; dance-pop; post-disco
- Length: 3:54
- Label: Universal New Zealand
- Songwriters: Ella Yelich-O'Connor; Jack Antonoff; Joel Little
- Producers: Lorde; Antonoff; Frank Dukes

Lorde singles chronology
"Magnets" (2015)	"Green Light" (2017)	"Perfect Places" (2017)

Music video
- "Green Light" on YouTube

"Green Light" is a song by New Zealand singer-songwriter Lorde, released on 2 March 2017 as the lead single from her second studio album Melodrama (2017). It was written and produced by Lorde and Jack Antonoff, with additional writing by Joel Little and production assistance from Frank Dukes, and was released to radio stations by Universal. Musically, "Green Light" is an electropop, dance-pop, and post-disco song. The lyrics use a "green light" as a traffic light metaphor that gives Lorde permission to move on with her life after a breakup.

The song received widespread acclaim from critics, many of whom praised its production and Lorde's vocal delivery. It earned the Silver Scroll Award at the New Zealand APRA Awards and appeared on various year-end and decade-end lists. Commercially, the song topped the charts in New Zealand, whilst peaking inside the top ten in Australia, Canada, Scotland, and Israel, and in the top twenty in the Austria, Belgium, Hungary, Ireland, Spain, Switzerland, the UK, and the US. "Green Light" received platinum and multi-platinum certifications in Australia, Brazil, Canada, Italy, New Zealand, the UK, and the US.

Grant Singer directed the music video for "Green Light", which shows Lorde leaving a nightclub and walking through the city streets as she tries to move on from a breakup. Photography took place primarily at MacArthur Park in Los Angeles. She performed "Green Light" at Saturday Night Live and at multiple music festivals. A remix of the song by Canadian electro-funk duo Chromeo was released on 19 May 2017. Lorde included the song on the set list for the Melodrama (2017–2018), Solar Power (2022–2023) and Ultrasound (2025-26) concert tours.

== Background and release ==
"The song is really about those moments kind of immediately after your life changes and about all the silly little things that you gravitate towards. It sounds so happy and then the lyrics are so intense obviously."

— Lorde talking about the song's meaning during a Beats 1 interview with Zane Lowe.

Prior to the song's release, Lorde told her followers on Twitter that "Green Light" would be "different, and [kind of] unexpected. Complex and funny and sad and joyous and it'll make you [dance]." Her decision to create an uptempo track was influenced by how calm songs on the radio were for her musical taste. The downtempo and slow atmosphere of those songs made her want to introduce a different style of music back to the radio waves.

In an interview with Tavi Gevinson's podcast Rookie, she revealed that the song's piano part was inspired when she went to a Florence and the Machine concert with Jack Antonoff. The singer's pianist made "big, jangly" piano movements, where "the physicality of that movement [...] became the way Jack played" that part in the song. Lorde also revealed that her sound-to-color synesthesia played a significant factor in the song's title, saying that a "swirling combo of high school and recent and private and public memories" helped to make the title represent a green traffic light. She announced the release of the single and its music video on Twitter on 2 March 2017.

When previewing the track for Swedish producer Max Martin, he did not think the song would become a hit. Martin had an issue with "melodic math — shortening a part." He called the lyrics "incorrect songwriting" and noted the marked key change after the piano sequences. However, Lorde later clarified in a podcast interview with The Spinoff that Martin's critiques were made in reference to her 2013 song "Royals". Realizing that top 40 songs usually have key changes reserved for amplified final choruses, Lorde herself called "Green Light" a "strange piece of music." She acknowledges the "drums [do not] show up on the chorus until halfway through, which creates this other, bizarre part."

== Composition and lyrical interpretation ==
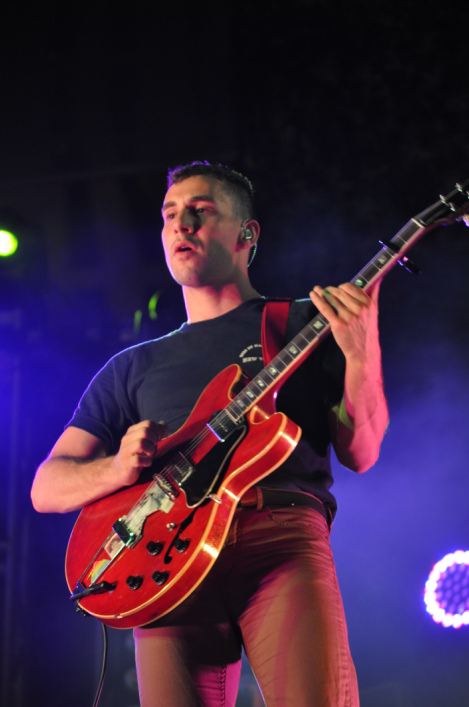
Jack Antonoff (pictured) co-wrote "Green Light".

"Green Light" was written by Lorde (credited under her birth name Ella Yelich-O'Connor), Antonoff, and Joel Little, with production handled by the former two and Frank Dukes. It was the first track Lorde wrote for Melodrama. Writing took place over an 18-month period. Lorde's first heartbreak inspired the lyrics, leading reviewers to characterise them as being "downbeat" as well as having an "acceptance of longing".

Spencer Kornhaber from The Atlantic stated that Lorde was singing about the transitional phase of a breakup and obsessing over her ex "misleading" his new partner in the lyrics, "She thinks you love the beach, you're such a damn liar". Kornhaber compared the "loop of bliss" in the last minute of the track to The Smiths song "How Soon Is Now?" (1984). Pretty Much Amazing writer Danilo Bortoli noted a change in perspective in Lorde's songwriting compared to her debut album. He also wrote that she used to portray the "role of master observer" and compared her new view to British singer Tracey Thorn.

Musically, "Green Light" was described as an electropop, dance-pop, and post-disco song. According to sheet music published at Musicnotes.com by Sony/ATV Music Publishing, "Green Light" is set in common time with a "driving" tempo of 129 beats per minute. The song is composed in the key of A major, with Lorde's vocals ranging between the notes of D_{3} and A_{4}. The BBC described the chorus that follows this section as "euphoric", while Forbes deemed it as power pop, featuring hand-claps, bass, and strings.

The track begins with her singing solo with a lone piano playing "slow, steady" power chords consisting of a root note and the fifth above. Subsequently, in the first of the song's two pre-choruses, a "throbbing beat" plays amid "tongue-twisting lyrics, eerie background vocals, and bubbling electronic effects." In the second pre-chorus, a "cheery, upbeat piano loop and a kick drum" accompany Lorde as she sings about an "uneasy new reality." Here, the titular metaphor comes in the form of a hook: "I'm waiting for it, that green light, I want it," leading reviewers to interpret the "green light" as a street signal that gives the singer permission to move on into the future.

== Critical reception ==
"Green Light" received widespread acclaim from music critics upon its release, with many publications placing the song in their respective year-end lists. Jason Lipshutz of Billboard commended the track, highlighting the singer's songwriting in particular, saying, "Lorde makes a good case that her songwriting, above all else, is her strongest asset." In his favorable A review, Nolan Feeney of Entertainment Weekly praised the song's production, stating that it sounded "like nothing else on the radio or in your Spotify playlists." Hugh McIntyre of Forbes noted Lorde's transition from her previous melancholia production to a "more upbeat feeling". He also praised the singer for being able to create a dance song "without caving into any trend in pop or dance".

NME's Rhian Daly described "Green Light" as "different and unexpected"; Daly also noted Lorde's angry and theatrical vocal delivery, calling her voice "raspier, a touch deeper, still with that elegance and poise she emerged with." Pitchfork awarded it Best New Track, with writer Laura Snapes calling it a "comeback breakup jam" and complimenting the song's "euphoria." Stereogum's James Rettig called it "an incandescent number that feels like a natural progression from the insular pop of Pure Heroine." Patrick Ryan of USA Today said the song is "unlike anything she—or frankly, any pop star in recent memory—has put out before", noting its diverse production and "heartfelt lyrics", going on to call the track an "earworm."

Writing for The Atlantic, Spencer Kornhaber said that at first listen, the track "comes off as an EDM remix" of Lorde's past material, but after several spins "reveals its tricky logic—and drops a payload of emotion." He also mentions how the "dark theatrical vocal delivery in the verses" is what distinguishes a Lorde track from The Chainsmokers' guest singers. Pretty Much Amazing writer Danilo Bortoli called the track "explosive and contagious." In a mixed-positive review, Craig Jenkins of Vulture said the song "locates the universality in a very specific experience, as a truly effective pop gem should" but also noted its conventional "radio fare" production, being "too faithful to the style of its predecessors." In an interview write-up, Time editor Sam Lansky commended the track for being a "cathartic sing-along that takes an eerie vocal introduction and builds into a thunderous chorus." He felt it is "both unsettled and euphoric like doing jumping jacks in the rain."

=== Accolades ===
"Green Light" appeared on numerous critics' listicles. The song ranked number 6 on Triple J, Hottest 100.

Select critical rankings for "Green Light"
Critic/Organization	Time span	Rank	Published year
The A.V. Club	Year-end	2	2017
Billboard	Year-end	13	2017
Consequence of Sound	Year-end	2	2017
Consequence of Sound	Decade-end	26	2019
Consequence of Sound	Decade-end (Pop songs)	8	2019
The Guardian	Year-end	1	2017
Insider	Decade-end	23	2017
NME	Year-end	1	2017
NME	Decade-end	2	2019
Paste	Year-end	19	2017
Pitchfork	Year-end	3	2017
Rolling Stone	Decade-end	82	2019
Slant	Year-end	2	2017
Slant	Decade-end	39	2020
Stereogum	Year-end	7	2017
Stereogum	Decade-end	10	2020
The Village Voice	Year-end	4	2017
The Times	21st century	4	2022

== Commercial performance ==
Commercially, "Green Light" achieved success following its release. In the United Kingdom, the song debuted at number 28 on the UK Singles Chart, in the issue dated 16 March 2017. On the week of 20 April, it reached the 20th position after leaping seven spots, becoming her second top 20 entry on the chart, after "Royals". "Green Light" received a Platinum certification by the British Phonographic Industry (BPI) on 18 August 2017 for 600,000 sales. In Spain, the song debuted at number 13, becoming Lorde's second top twenty entry in the chart. "Green Light" peaked within the top ten in Canada, Iceland, and Israel.

In the United States, "Green Light" debuted at number 100 on Billboard Hot 100 based on the song's first roughly half-day streaming and sales, as well as its first three-and-a-half days of airplay. The following week, the song leaped from 100 to number 19, and debuted at number six (52,000 downloads sold) on Digital Songs Sales, and at number 20 (13.6 million U.S. streams) on Streaming Songs, while drawing 20 million in radio airplay audience. It marked Lorde's third top 20 hit, preceded by "Royals" and "Team" (2013). With a leap of 81 spots, "Green Light" became one of several songs to have the biggest single-week upward movements since Jeannie C. Riley's "Harper Valley PTA" first accomplished this in 1968. The song performed modestly in other Billboard markets, landing within the top 20 on the Mainstream Top 40, and the top ten on the country's Alternative Songs and Rock Airplay charts. It received a double Platinum certification from the Recording Industry Association of America (RIAA) for over two million shipments.

"Green Light" was successful in Oceania. On the report dated 19 March 2017, the song debuted at number four on the Australian ARIA Singles Chart. In Australia, it received an eight-times Platinum certification for sales of 560,000 equivalent units. The track debuted and peaked at number one on the New Zealand Top 40 Singles chart on the report dated 13 March 2017, receiving a quintuple Platinum certification by the Recorded Music NZ (RMNZ) for sales of 150,000 equivalent units.

== Music video ==
=== Background ===
Grant Singer directed the music video for "Green Light", and shot the visual for Lorde's follow-up single, "Perfect Places" (2017). Lorde contacted Grant a couple of months before the video's release, and the pair later met for dinner in New York City. Struck by Lorde's "passion, sincerity and thoughtfulness," a collaboration between the pair ensued. Having not released a music video of her own in several years, both Lorde and Singer wanted to take a new direction from her earlier works. This led to him choosing 16 mm film to shoot the video, a technique rarely used in modern videos, which generally use 35 mm film. Singer explained that the idea of choosing 16 mm film felt timeless and was intentional to make the video feel like it was not made in 2017. When explaining the new direction of her videos in a behind the scenes shoot with Vevo, Lorde said:

“I was very aware that this is the first thing that people had seen from me in three years. I was picking up where I had, which was I always had dark lipstick on and in a weird kind of outfit. And this time, I was like, I want to look the way my friends see me. I want to feel like I could be any one of the young people who listen to my music.”

One particular scene where Lorde takes a "payphone off the hook for no reason" was improvised and went unnoticed during the filming process. Singer decided to leave the part in afterwards as it was a "magic moment" and cutting it would have been "criminal." Explaining the location of the video, shot at MacArthur Park in Los Angeles, Singer said that he did not want to make the area seem specific. He describes the area as a "no man's land between downtown and Koreatown." In an interview with NME, Lorde revealed that the video and song are "symbiotic" saying that she wanted the video to be set at night, just like her "real life." During the video, she wears white Adidas shoes, which she says is what she wears when she goes partying at home.

=== Synopsis ===
During this scene, Lorde lifts a payphone off its hook. Director Grant Singer specified that the scene was "accidental" and called it a "magic moment" during the filming process.

The video starts with a close up shot of Lorde looking at herself in a mirror in a public restroom. In the next scene, she is dancing slowly in a club, with the silhouettes of other partygoers and flashing lights around her. She then exits the club at night, dressed in a hot pink Giorgio di Sant'Angelo tie-back mini dress and white Adidas Originals superstars, and steps inside a black Uber. Lorde opens the passenger window and places her head partly outside the window, letting the wind rush by her as the Uber drives through the streets of Los Angeles. In the following scene, she is seen dancing on top of the Uber while red lights shine on her.

Walking the streets alone, Lorde plays a Walkman, puts on earphones, and dances joyously. She then takes a payphone off its hook. During the pre-chorus, Lorde is inside the bathroom from the first scene with Antonoff playing piano in the background. Several shots of her dancing and moving her hair back and forth are shown, with one particular shot showing her placing her head down on what appears to be a car with flashing green lights. In the last scene, Lorde makes her way through an overpass at sunset, as a green light reflects on her face.

=== Reception ===
Rolling Stone called the video "electrifying," describing her as being "swathed in electric pink mesh" and sealing her "kiss-off with a bang". Aimee Cliff from The Fader compared Lorde's dancing to Robyn in "Dancing on My Own" (2010). Cliff also compared the video to Grimes' "Oblivion" (2012) where both artists use headphones to symbolize that dancing is for one's own pleasure. Alexandrina Hemsley, from the performance duo Project O, drew a comparison between Madonna's "Ray of Light" (1998) and Ciara's "Oh" (2005) for featuring dancing on top of a car. Pitchfork ranked the video at number 11 on their year-end list, stating that the video documented the singer's "expressive style of modern dance" that was a "glowing vision" of how "romantic" it can feel to be "alone in public". Nate Gross from Exile Edit received a nomination for Best Editing at the 2017 MTV Video Music Awards, losing to Ryan Staake and Eric Degliomini's work on Young Thug's "Wyclef Jean" (2017).

After part of the video was screened on television in New Zealand, a man in the country filed a complaint with the Broadcasting Standards Authority, the national media regulator, claiming a scene in it "encouraged reckless driving". He also claimed that it "breached the Free-to-air TV Code's law and order standard". The authority did not uphold the complaint, saying that Lorde did "not actively encourage viewers to imitate her," and in their view, "her actions did not amount to direct incitement to break the law, nor did they encourage or condone criminal activity."

== Live performances and promotion ==
Lorde first promoted "Green Light" by posting a link to her Twitter account, which led fans to a website called imwaitingforit.com. The site featured a short video clip of Lorde sitting in a car while eating fries and drinking from a styrofoam to-go cup as a piano-backed track plays on in the background. The screen then flashes the dates "3.2.17 NYC" and "3.3.17 NZ". According to Fact magazine, the clip was also broadcast on major TV channels in New Zealand. The singer further promoted her first single by broadcasting the location of three mysterious installations, which featured an abandoned car illuminated in green light, a projection lit in green playing a 5-second music video clip and a neon sign with song lyrics. The installations were held in her hometown of Auckland.

Lorde first performed "Green Light" on Saturday Night Live on 11 March 2017. Lorde's performance was met with positive reviews by critics, although viewers criticised Lorde's dancing. The singer later responded by saying, "One day I will do a normal dance choreographed by a nice person and I will look more like your other favourite performers but we have not yet reached that day." In an analysis from The Fader, the publication defended Lorde's dancing, stating that Western top 40 pop music has centred around "pristine choreography" but the artist's body movements are "more freeform and spontaneous, and it speaks an entirely different expressive language". Entertainment Weekly wrote a positive review, stating that the performance "held true" to Nolan Feeney's 'A' review of the track. The publication described Lorde's dance moves as "delightfully wacky". Paste writer E.C. Flamming described it as "energetic" and commented on her "patented spastic dance style". Lorde also performed "Green Light" at the 2017 Coachella Valley Music Festival in California.

The track was included in the set lists for the Melodrama (2017-18), Solar Power (2022-23), and Ultrasound (2025-26) concert tours. On the Melodrama and Ultrasound tours, the song was the final song of the set before the encore.

The television shows New Girl and Quantico used the track on their soundtracks. "Green Light" was also featured on the third season of the reality television show RuPaul's Drag Race: All Stars, in which drag queens Kennedy Davenport and BenDeLaCreme lip synced it.

== Legacy ==
"Green Light" is a major point of reference for the teenage characters in Kimberly Belflower's acclaimed Tony Award-nominated Broadway play John Proctor is the Villain.

== Track listing ==
Digital download
No.	Title	Length
1.	"Green Light"	3:54

Digital download – Chromeo Remix
No.	Title	Length
1.	"Green Light" (Chromeo Remix)	4:07

== Credits and personnel ==
Credits adapted from the liner notes of Melodrama.

Recording and management

- Recorded at Electric Lady Studios (New York City), Rough Customer Studio (Brooklyn Heights, New York), and Westlake Recording Studios (Los Angeles, California)
- Mixed at MixStar Studios (Virginia)
- Mastered at Sterling Sound Studios (New York City)
- Published by Songs Music Publishing, Sony/ATV Songs LLC, Ducky Donath Music (BMI), EMI Blackwood Music (BMI) and first verse produced for Suga Wuga Music

Personnel

- Lorde – vocals, songwriter, producer
- Joel Little – writer
- Jack Antonoff – writer, producer
- Kuk Harrell – vocal production (first verse)
- Laura Sisk – engineer
- John Hanes – mixing engineer
- Serban Ghenea – mixing
- Barry McCready – assistant, engineer
- Greg Eliason – assistant, engineer
- Tom Coyne – mastering engineer

== Charts ==
=== Weekly charts ===
Weekly chart performance for "Green Light"
Chart (2017)	Peak position
Australia (ARIA)	4
Austria (Ö3 Austria Top 40)	19
Belgium (Ultratop 50 Flanders)	19
Belgium (Ultratop 50 Wallonia)	39
Canada Hot 100 (Billboard)	9
Canada CHR/Top 40 (Billboard)	19
Canada Hot AC (Billboard)	11
Canada Rock (Billboard)	24
Czech Republic Airplay (ČNS IFPI)	29
Czech Republic Singles Digital (ČNS IFPI)	11
France (SNEP)	24
Germany (GfK)	33
Hungary (Rádiós Top 40)	36
Hungary (Single Top 40)	20
Ireland (IRMA)	17
Israel International Airplay (Media Forest)	3
Italy (FIMI)	29
Japan Hot 100 (Billboard)	95
Lebanon (Lebanese Top 20)	18
Netherlands (Dutch Top 40)	31
Netherlands (Single Top 100)	61
New Zealand (Recorded Music NZ)	1
Portugal (AFP)	22
Scottish Singles Sales (Official Charts)	6
Slovakia Airplay (ČNS IFPI)	71
Slovakia Singles Digital (ČNS IFPI)	23
Spain (Promusicae)	13
Sweden (Sverigetopplistan)	58
Switzerland (Schweizer Hitparade)	19
UK Singles (Official Charts)	20
US Billboard Hot 100	19
US Adult Contemporary (Billboard)	29
US Adult Pop Airplay (Billboard)	18
US Dance Club Songs (Billboard)	34
US Pop Airplay (Billboard)	20
US Alternative Airplay (Billboard)	9
US Rock & Alternative Airplay (Billboard)	9
US Anglo (Monitor Latino)	15

=== Year-end charts ===
Year-end chart performance for "Green Light"
Chart (2017)	Position
Australia (ARIA)	23
Belgium (Ultratop Flanders)	98
Canada (Canadian Hot 100)	96
Hungary (Stream Top 40)	96
Iceland (Tónlistinn)	46
Latvia Airplay (LaIPA)	83
New Zealand (Recorded Music NZ)	23
UK Singles (Official Charts Company)	88
US Alternative Songs (Billboard)	38

== Certifications ==
Certifications for "Green Light"
Region	Certification	Certified units/sales
Australia (ARIA)	8× Platinum	560,000^{‡}
Austria (IFPI Austria)	Platinum	30,000^{‡}
Brazil (Pro-Música Brasil)	2× Platinum	120,000^{‡}
Canada (Music Canada)	4× Platinum	320,000^{‡}
Denmark (IFPI Danmark)	Gold	45,000^{‡}
France (SNEP)	Gold	100,000^{‡}
Germany (BVMI)	Gold	200,000^{‡}
Italy (FIMI)	Platinum	50,000^{‡}
Mexico (AMPROFON)	Gold	30,000^{‡}
New Zealand (RMNZ)	5× Platinum	150,000^{‡}
Norway (IFPI Norway)	Gold	20,000^{‡}
Spain (Promusicae)	Gold	30,000^{‡}
United Kingdom (BPI)	2× Platinum	1,200,000^{‡}
United States (RIAA)	2× Platinum	2,000,000^{‡}
^{‡} Sales+streaming figures based on certification alone.

== Release and radio history ==
Region	Date	Format	Version	Label	Ref.
Various	2 March 2017	Digital download	Original	Universal Music New Zealand	
United Kingdom	2 March 2017	Contemporary hit radio	Original	Virgin EMI	
Italy	2 March 2017	Contemporary hit radio	Original	Universal	
United States	7 March 2017	Top 40 radio	Original	Lava; Republic	
United States	7 March 2017	Rhythmic radio	Original	Lava; Republic	
Canada	19 May 2018	Digital download	Chromeo Remix	Universal Music New Zealand	

== See also ==
- List of number-one singles from the 2010s (New Zealand)
