= 2017 MTV Video Music Awards =

Award ceremony

- Date: Sunday, August 27, 2017
- Venue: The Forum (Inglewood, California)
- Country: United States
- Hosted by: Katy Perry

Highlights
- Most awards: Kendrick Lamar (6)
- Most nominations: Kendrick Lamar (8)
- Website: www.mtv.com/vma

Television/radio coverage
- Network: MTV; MTV2; VH1; MTV Classic; BET; CMT; Comedy Central; Logo TV; Spike; TV Land
- Runtime: 185 minutes
- Produced by: Bruce Gillmer; Garrett English; Jesse Ignjatovic
- Directed by: Alex Rudzinski

The 2017 MTV Video Music Awards were held on August 27, 2017 at The Forum in Inglewood, California, honoring music videos released between June 25, 2016 and June 23, 2017. It was hosted by Katy Perry. The 34th annual award show aired live from the venue for the second time in its history. The music video for Taylor Swift's song "Look What You Made Me Do" premiered during the broadcast. Lil Yachty co-hosted the pre-show with Terrence J, Charlamagne Tha God, and MTV News' Gaby Wilson, while Gabbie Hanna hosted backstage for the show. It was broadcast across various Viacom networks and their related apps.

Compared to the previous year, viewership was down from 6.5 million to 5.68 million viewers, making it the lowest viewed show since 1994. A combination of having to compete with the season finale of HBO's Game of Thrones, which drew over 12.07 million viewers, and the ability to now stream the award show online is said to account for the drop in viewership.

== Performances ==
List of musical performances
| Artist(s) | Song(s) |
Pre-show
| Cardi B | "Bodak Yellow" |
| Bleachers | "Don't Take the Money" |
| Khalid | "Location" "Young Dumb & Broke" |
Main show
| Kendrick Lamar | "DNA" "Humble" |
| Ed Sheeran; Lil Uzi Vert | "Shape of You" "XO Tour Llif3" |
| Julia Michaels | "Issues" |
| Shawn Mendes | "There's Nothing Holdin' Me Back" |
| Lorde | "Homemade Dynamite" |
| Fifth Harmony; Gucci Mane | "Angel" "Down" |
| Miley Cyrus | "Younger Now" |
| Demi Lovato | "Sorry Not Sorry" (Pre-Taped from the Palms Casino in Las Vegas) |
| Pink | Michael Jackson Video Vanguard Medley "Get the Party Started" "Raise Your Glass" "So What" "Fuckin' Perfect" "Just Give Me a Reason" "Don't Let Me Get Me" "Blow Me (One Last Kiss)" "What About Us" |
| Kyle | "iSpy" |
| James Arthur | "Say You Won't Let Go" (Part of a Commercial) |
| Alessia Cara | "Scars to Your Beautiful" |
| Logic; Khalid; Alessia Cara | "1-800-273-8255" |
| Thirty Seconds to Mars; Travis Scott | "Walk on Water" "Butterfly Effect" |
| Rod Stewart; DNCE | "Da Ya Think I'm Sexy?" (Pre-Taped from the Palms Casino in Las Vegas) |
| Katy Perry; Nicki Minaj | "Swish Swish" |
After-show (only web)
| Demi Lovato | "Cool for the Summer" |

== Appearances ==
=== Pre-show ===
- Gaby Wilson — announced the winners of Best Choreography and Song of the Summer

=== Main show ===
- Jack McBrayer, Buzz Aldrin, Peggy Whitson, Abbi Jacobson, Kathryn Hahn and Kevin Bacon — appeared in a skit with host Katy Perry
- Paris Jackson — presented Best Pop Video
- Hailee Steinfeld — introduced Julia Michaels
- Yara Shahidi — introduced Shawn Mendes
- Jack Antonoff and Alessandra Ambrosio — introduced Lorde
- Teyana Taylor and Pete Wentz — presented Best Dance Video
- Fred Armisen — appeared in a skit with host Katy Perry
- DJ Khaled — introduced Fifth Harmony
- Ludacris and Olivia Munn — presented Best Collaboration
- Jared Leto — paid tribute to Chester Bennington and Chris Cornell and introduced a clip of Linkin Park's 2010 VMA performance
- Billy Eichner — appeared in a skit with host Katy Perry
- Pete Davidson and Tiffany Haddish — presented Best Hip Hop Video
- Cardi B — introduced Demi Lovato
- Ellen DeGeneres — presented the Video Vanguard Award
- Millie Bobby Brown — presented Artist of the Year
- Vanessa Hudgens — introduced Alessia Cara
- Kesha — introduced Logic, Khalid and Alessia Cara
- Bebe Rexha and The Chainsmokers — presented Best New Artist
- Lil Yachty — introduced Thirty Seconds to Mars
- Rev. Robert Wright Lee IV — gave a speech denouncing racism and introduced Susan Bro
- Susan Bro — spoke about the Heather Heyer Foundation and presented Best Fight Against the System
- Hailey Baldwin — introduced Rod Stewart and DNCE
- Gal Gadot — presented Video of the Year
- Noah Cyrus — introduced Katy Perry and Nicki Minaj

== Winners and nominees ==
The list of nominations was revealed on July 25, 2017. For the nominations, MTV continued to eliminate gender-specific awards categories, as they did at the 2017 MTV Movie & TV Awards. MTV also announced the "Moonman" statue would be renamed a "Moon Person". The Best Female and Best Male Video awards were replaced with one category, Artist of the Year. Kendrick Lamar leads the list of nominees with eight categories, while Katy Perry, The Weeknd, and DJ Khaled received the second most nods with five. Nominees for Song of the Summer category were announced on August 22, 2017. Winners are listed in bold.

| Video of the Year | Artist of the Year |
|---|---|
| **Kendrick Lamar — "Humble"**; Alessia Cara — "Scars to Your Beautiful"; DJ Khaled (featuring Rihanna and Bryson Tiller) — "Wild Thoughts"; Bruno Mars — "24K Magic"; The Weeknd — "Reminder" | **Ed Sheeran**; Ariana Grande; Kendrick Lamar; Lorde; Bruno Mars; The Weeknd |
| Best New Artist | Best Collaboration |
| **Khalid**; Noah Cyrus; Kodak Black; Julia Michaels; SZA; Young M.A | **Zayn and Taylor Swift — "I Don't Wanna Live Forever"**; The Chainsmokers (featuring Halsey) — "Closer"; DJ Khaled (featuring Rihanna and Bryson Tiller) — "Wild Thoughts"; DRAM (featuring Lil Yachty) — "Broccoli"; Calvin Harris (featuring Pharrell Williams, Katy Perry and Big Sean) — "Feels"; Charlie Puth (featuring Selena Gomez) — "We Don't Talk Anymore" |
| Best Pop Video | Best Hip-Hop Video |
| **Fifth Harmony (featuring Gucci Mane) — "Down"**; Miley Cyrus — "Malibu"; Shawn Mendes — "Treat You Better"; Katy Perry (featuring Skip Marley) – "Chained to the Rhythm"; Ed Sheeran — "Shape of You"; Harry Styles — "Sign of the Times" | **Kendrick Lamar — "Humble"**; Big Sean — "Bounce Back"; Chance the Rapper — "Same Drugs"; DJ Khaled (featuring Justin Bieber, Quavo, Chance the Rapper and Lil Wayne) — "I'm the One"; DRAM (featuring Lil Yachty) — "Broccoli"; Migos (featuring Lil Uzi Vert) — "Bad and Boujee" |
| Best Dance Video | Best Rock Video |
| **Zedd and Alessia Cara — "Stay"**; Afrojack (featuring Ty Dolla $ign) — "Gone"; Calvin Harris — "My Way"; Kygo and Selena Gomez — "It Ain't Me"; Major Lazer (featuring Justin Bieber and MØ) — "Cold Water" | **Twenty One Pilots — "Heavydirtysoul"**; Coldplay — "A Head Full of Dreams"; Fall Out Boy — "Young and Menace"; Foo Fighters — "Run"; Green Day — "Bang Bang" |
| Best Fight Against the System | Best Cinematography |
| **Big Sean — "Light"**; **Alessia Cara — "Scars to Your Beautiful"**; **The Hamilton Mixtape (K'naan, Snow Tha Product, Riz MC and Residente) – "Immigrants (We Get the Job Done)"**; **John Legend — "Surefire"**; **Logic (featuring Damian Lemar Hudson) – "Black Spiderman"**; **Taboo (featuring Shailene Woodley) – "Stand Up / Stand N Rock #NoDAPL "** | **Kendrick Lamar — "Humble." (Director of Photography: Scott Cunningham)**; DJ Shadow (featuring Run the Jewels) — "Nobody Speak" (Director of Photography: David Proctor); Halsey — "Now or Never" (Director of Photography: Kristof Brandl); Imagine Dragons — "Thunder" (Director of Photography: Matthew Wise); Ed Sheeran — "Castle on the Hill" (Director of Photography: Steve Annis) |
| Best Direction | Best Art Direction |
| **Kendrick Lamar — "Humble." (Directors: Dave Meyers and The Little Homies)**; Alessia Cara — "Scars to Your Beautiful" (Director: Aaron A); Bruno Mars — "24K Magic" (Directors: Cameron Duddy and Bruno Mars); Katy Perry (featuring Skip Marley) — "Chained to the Rhythm" (Director: Mathew Cullen); The Weeknd — "Reminder" (Director: Glenn Michael) | **Kendrick Lamar — "Humble." (Art Director: Spencer Graves)**; DJ Khaled (featuring Rihanna and Bryson Tiller) — "Wild Thoughts" (Art Director: Damian Fyffe); Bruno Mars — "24K Magic" (Art Director: Alex Delgado); Katy Perry (featuring Migos) — "Bon Appétit" (Art Director: Natalie Groce); The Weeknd — "Reminder" (Art Directors: Lamar C Taylor and KID. STUDIO) |
| Best Visual Effects | Best Choreography |
| **Kendrick Lamar — "Humble." (Visual Effects: Jonah Hall of Timber)**; Kyle (featuring Lil Yachty) — "iSpy" (Visual Effects: Max Colt and Tomash Kuzmytskyi of GloriaFX); Katy Perry (featuring Skip Marley) — "Chained to the Rhythm" (Visual Effects: MIRADA); Harry Styles — "Sign of the Times" (Visual Effects: Cédric Nivoliez of ONE MORE); A Tribe Called Quest — "Dis Generation" (Visual Effects: Brandon Hirzel of Bemo) | **Kanye West — "Fade" (Choreographers: Teyana Taylor, Guapo, Matthew Pasterisa, Jae Blaze and Derek Watkins)**; Fifth Harmony (featuring Gucci Mane) — "Down" (Choreographer: Sean Bankhead); Ariana Grande (featuring Nicki Minaj) — "Side to Side" (Choreographers: Brian and Scott Nicholson); Kendrick Lamar — "Humble." (Choreographer: Dave Meyers); Sia — "The Greatest" (Choreographer: Ryan Heffington) |
| Best Editing | Song of Summer |
| **Young Thug — "Wyclef Jean" (Editors: Ryan Staake and Eric Degliomini)**; The Chainsmokers (featuring Halsey) — "Closer" (Editor: Jennifer Kennedy); Future — "Mask Off" (Editor: Vinnie Hobbs of VHPost); Lorde — "Green Light" (Editor: Nate Gross of Exile Edit); The Weeknd — "Reminder" (Editor: Red Barbaza) | **Lil Uzi Vert — "XO Tour Llif3"**; Camila Cabello (featuring Quavo) — "OMG"; DJ Khaled (featuring Rihanna and Bryson Tiller) — "Wild Thoughts"; Fifth Harmony (featuring Gucci Mane) — "Down"; Luis Fonsi and Daddy Yankee (featuring Justin Bieber) — "Despacito (Remix)"; Demi Lovato — "Sorry Not Sorry"; Shawn Mendes — "There's Nothing Holdin' Me Back"; Ed Sheeran — "Shape of You" |
Michael Jackson Video Vanguard Award
**Pink**

== Artists with multiple wins and nominations ==
Artists who received multiple awards
| Wins | Artist |
|---|---|
| 6 | Kendrick Lamar |
| 2 | Alessia Cara |

Artists who received multiple nominations
| Nominations | Artist |
|---|---|
| 8 | Kendrick Lamar |
| 5 | DJ Khaled |
| 5 | Katy Perry |
| 5 | The Weeknd |
| 4 | Alessia Cara |
| 4 | Bruno Mars |
| 4 | Bryson Tiller |
| 4 | Ed Sheeran |
| 4 | Rihanna |
| 3 | Big Sean |
| 3 | Fifth Harmony |
| 3 | Gucci Mane |
| 3 | Halsey |
| 3 | Justin Bieber |
| 3 | Lil Yachty |
| 3 | Skip Marley |
| 2 | Ariana Grande |
| 2 | Calvin Harris |
| 2 | Chance the Rapper |
| 2 | DRAM |
| 2 | Harry Styles |
| 2 | Lil Uzi Vert |
| 2 | Lorde |
| 2 | Migos |
| 2 | Quavo |
| 2 | Selena Gomez |
| 2 | Shawn Mendes |
| 2 | The Chainsmokers |

== Music Videos with multiple wins and nominations ==
Music Videos that received multiple awards
| Wins | Artist | Music Video |
|---|---|---|
| 6 | Kendrick Lamar | "Humble." |

Music Videos that received multiple nominations
| Nominations | Artist(s) | Music Video |
|---|---|---|
| 7 | Kendrick Lamar | "Humble." |
| 4 | DJ Khaled (featuring Rihanna and Bryson Tiller) | "Wild Thoughts" |
| 4 | The Weeknd | "Reminder" |
| 3 | Alessia Cara | "Scars to Your Beautiful" |
| 3 | Bruno Mars | "24K Magic" |
| 3 | Fifth Harmony (featuring Gucci Mane) | "Down" |
| 3 | Katy Perry (featuring Skip Marley) | "Chained to the Rhythm" |
| 2 | DRAM (featuring Lil Yachty) | "Broccoli" |
| 2 | Ed Sheeran | "Shape of You" |
| 2 | Harry Styles | "Sign of the Times" |
| 2 | The Chainsmokers (featuring Halsey) | "Closer" |

== See also ==
- 2017 MTV Europe Music Awards
