= MTV Video Music Award for Best Hip-Hop =

Annual music video award

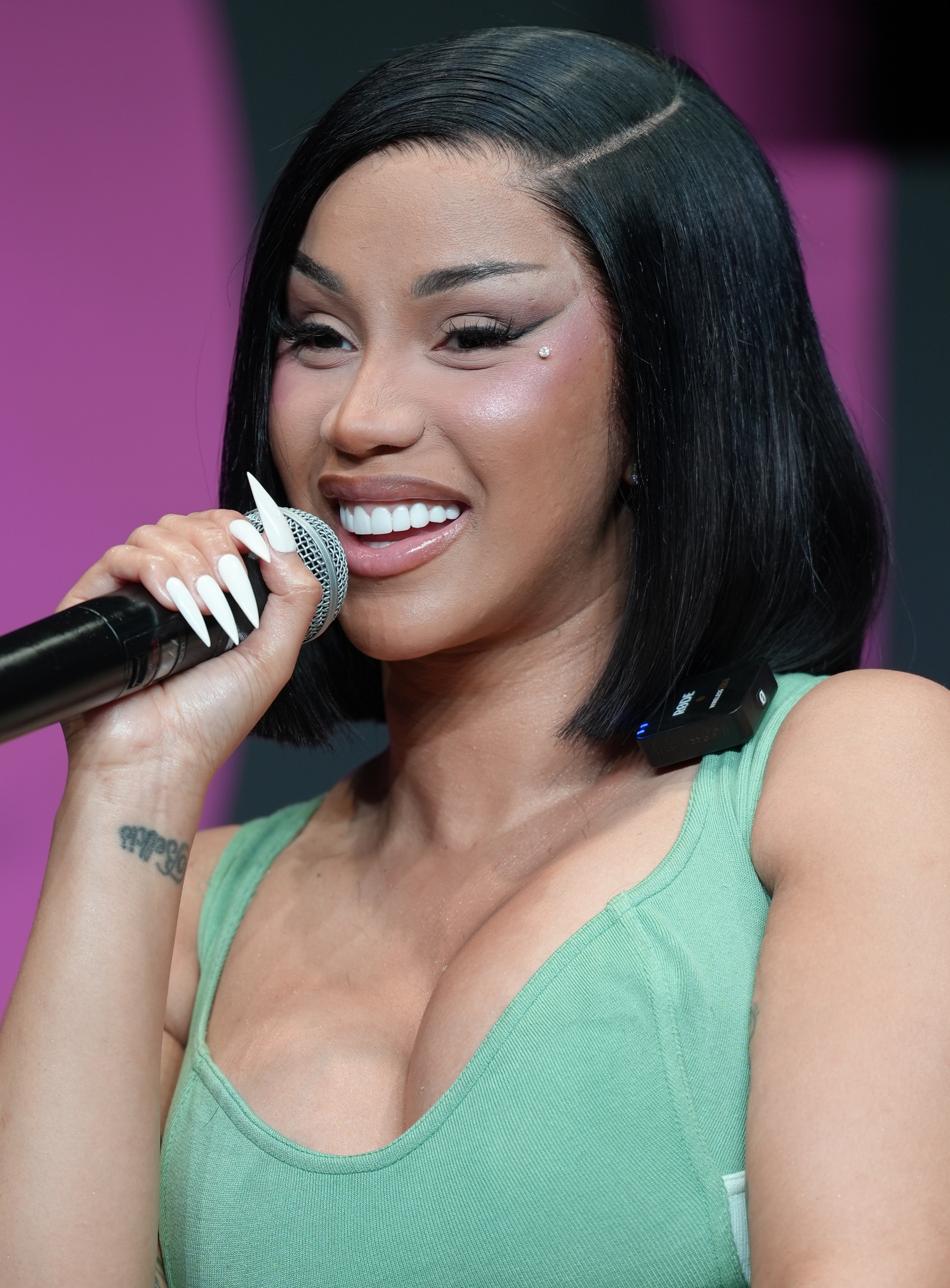
- Cardi B & Kehlani is the most recent recipient for "Safe"
- Awarded for: hip-hop music videos
- Country: United States
- Presented by: MTV
- First award: 1999
- Currently held by: Cardi B featuring Kehlani – "Safe" (2026)

Highlights
- Most awards: Nicki Minaj (5)
- Most nominations: Drake (16)
- Website: VMAs website

The MTV Video Music Award for Best Hip-Hop is an award given out at the annual MTV Video Music Awards. The category was first presented at the 1999 MTV Video Music Awards. The award, was originally intended for hip-hop songs that incorporated both R&B and rap elements, separate from rap music videos (which were instead honored by Best Rap Video), citing rap-singing artists such as TLC and Lauryn Hill as examples. This explains the recognition of songs such as "Thong Song" and "I'm Real (Remix)".

The award was not given out in 2007, as the VMAs were revamped and most original categories were eliminated, however, Best Hip Hop Video was reinstated in 2008. By then, though, the rules had relatively changed, as R&B and rap videos also became eligible for nominations in this category since the awards for Best Rap Video and Best R&B Video were not brought back. From the 2017 edition onwards, the word "Video" was removed from the names of all genre categories, leaving this award with its current name: Best Hip-Hop.

As of 2025, Nicki Minaj holds the record for most wins in this category, with five, followed by Drake and Eminem, both having received three awards. Drake also holds the record for most nominations, with sixteen times.

== Recipients ==
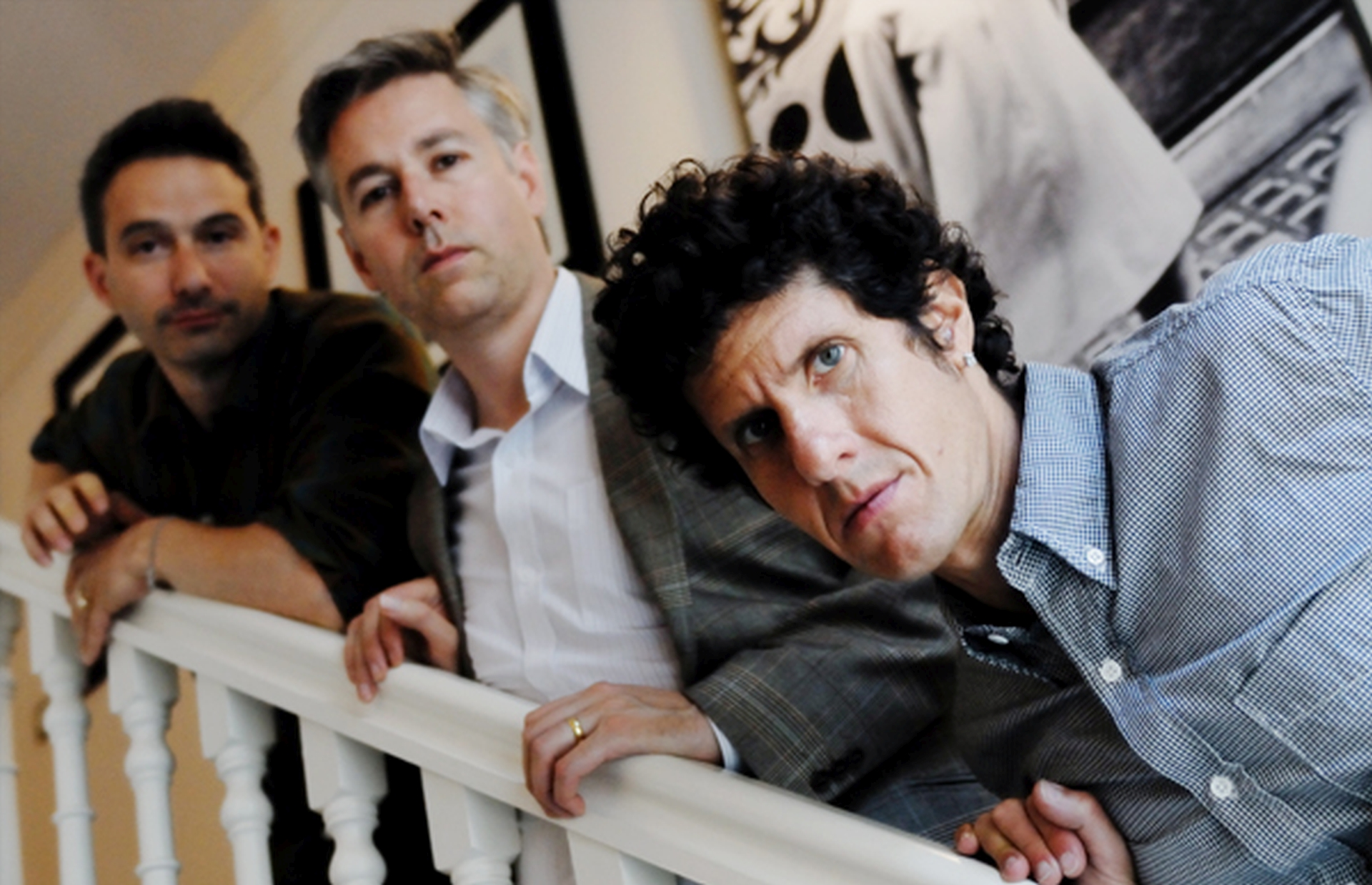
Inaugural winners Beastie Boys.

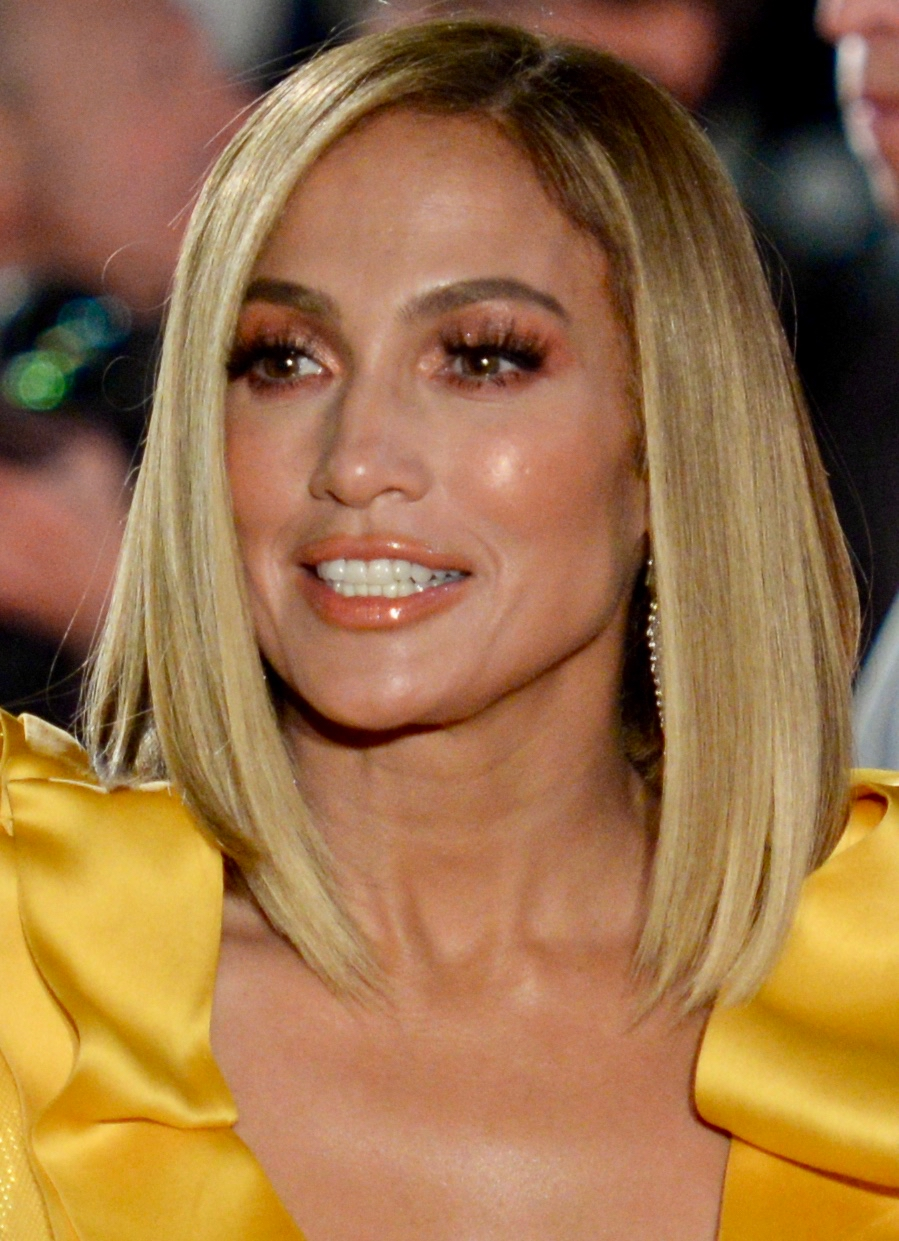
Jennifer Lopez was the first female act to win the category with "I'm Real (Remix)" with Ja Rule in 2002.

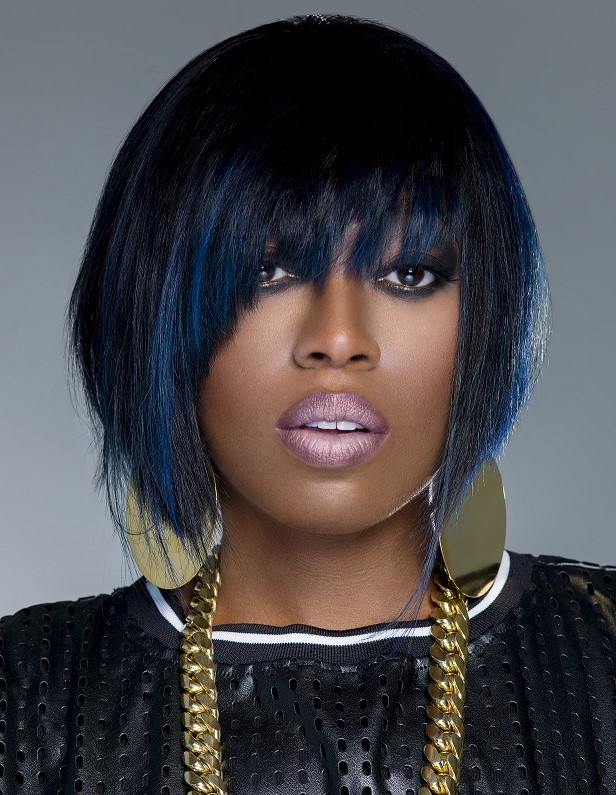
Missy Elliott was the first solo act and the first female rapper to win the category with "Work It" in 2003.

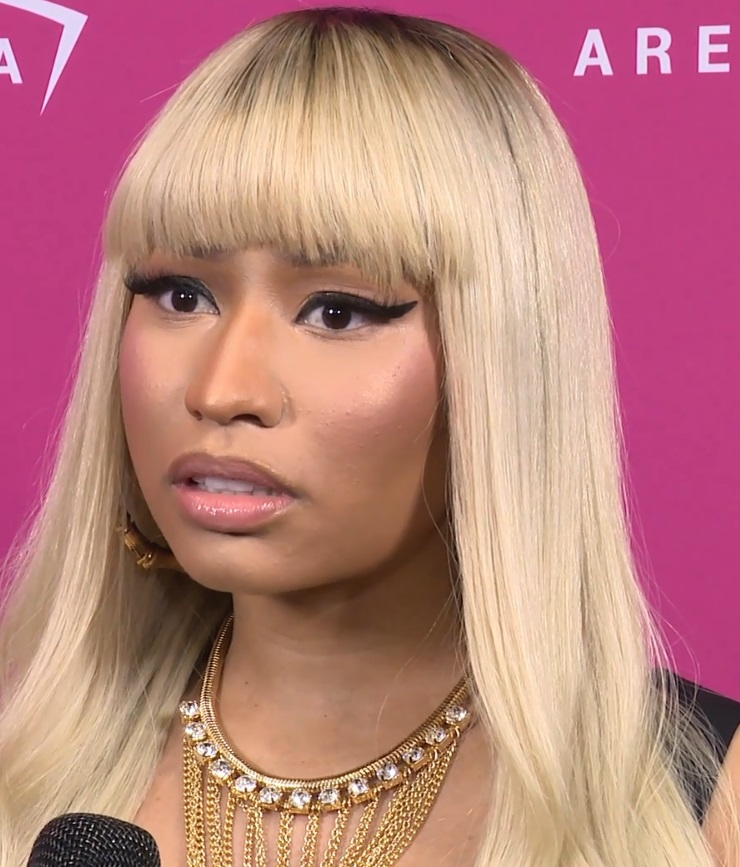
Nicki Minaj is the most awarded artist of the category with five awards.

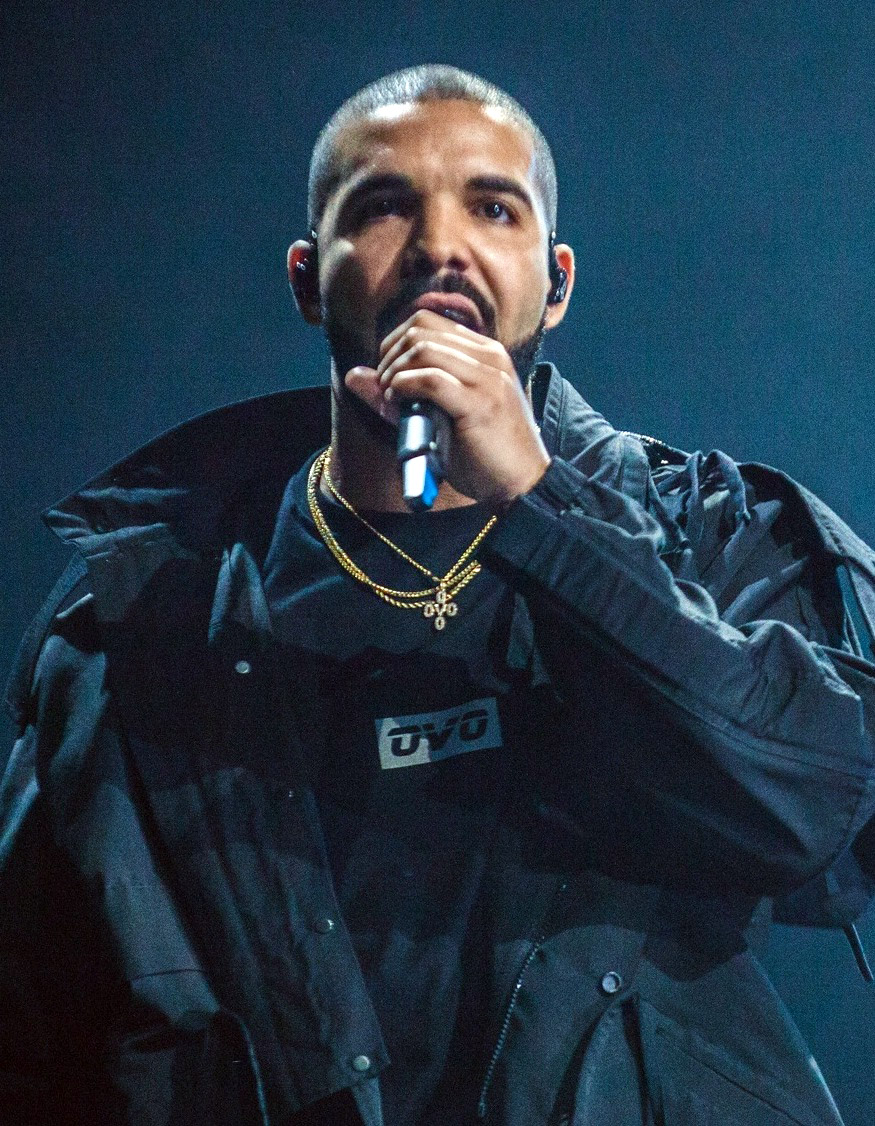
Drake is the most nominated act with fourteen. He is also the second most awarded artist with three awards.

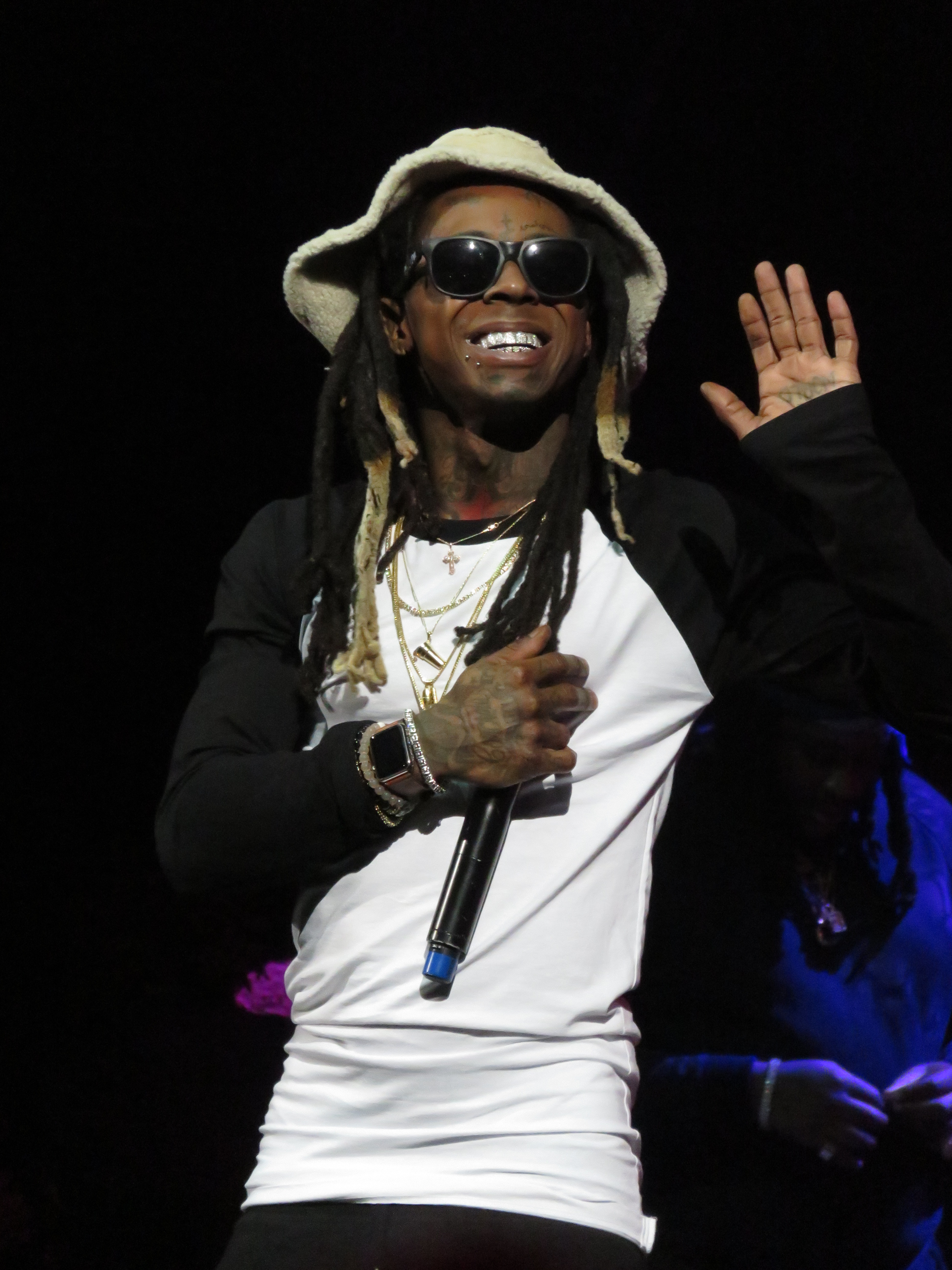
Lil Wayne received seven nominations in his career, winning two-time.

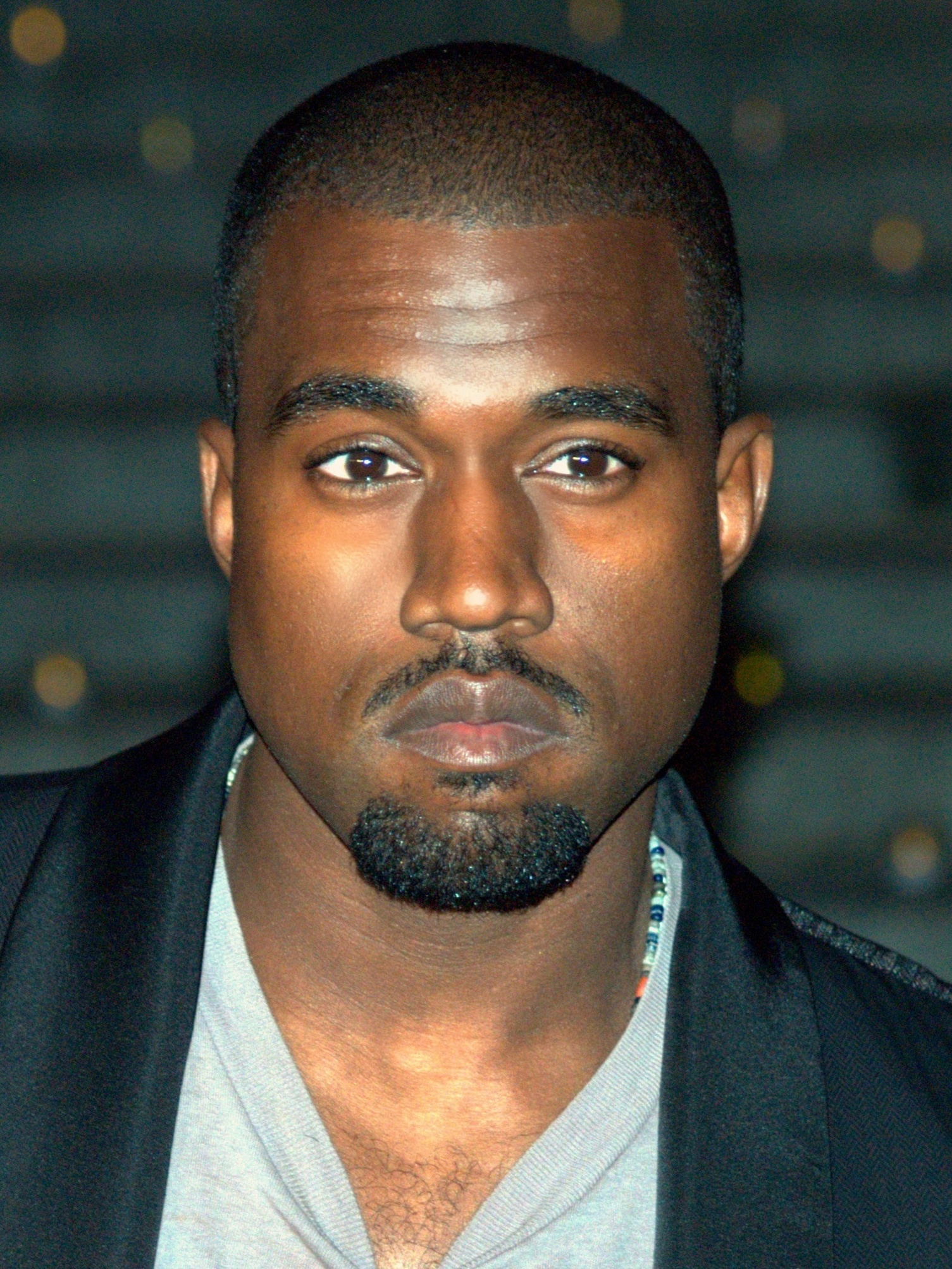
Kanye West received ten nominations in the category, without win.

=== 1990s ===
Recipients
Year (Note: Each year is linked to the article about the MTV Video Music Awards held that year.)	Winner(s)	Video	Nominees	Ref.
1999	Beastie Boys	"Intergalactic"	Busta Rhymes (featuring Janet Jackson) — "What's It Gonna Be?!"; Lauryn Hill — "Doo Wop (That Thing)"; TLC — "No Scrubs"	

=== 2000s ===
Recipients
Year (Note: Each year is linked to the article about the MTV Video Music Awards held that year.)	Winner(s)	Video	Nominees	Ref.
2000	Sisqó	"Thong Song"	Lauryn Hill — "Everything is Everything"; Juvenile — "Back That Thang Up"; Limp Bizkit (featuring Method Man) — "N 2 Gether Now"; Q-Tip — "Vivrant Thing"	
2001	Outkast	"Ms. Jackson"	The Black Eyed Peas (featuring Macy Gray) — "Request Line"; City High — "What Would You Do?"; Missy Elliott — "Get Ur Freak On"; Eve (featuring Gwen Stefani) — "Let Me Blow Ya Mind"	
2002	Jennifer Lopez (featuring Ja Rule)	"I'm Real (Remix)"	Busta Rhymes (featuring P. Diddy and Pharrell) — "Pass the Courvoisier, Part II"; Missy Elliott (featuring Ludacris and Trina) — "One Minute Man"; Fat Joe (featuring Ashanti) — "What's Luv?"; Ja Rule (featuring Ashanti) — "Always on Time"; Outkast (featuring Killer Mike) — "The Whole World"	
2003	Missy Elliott	"Work It"	Busta Rhymes (featuring Mariah Carey) — "I Know What You Want"; Jay-Z (featuring Beyoncé) — "'03 Bonnie & Clyde"; Nelly — "Hot in Herre"; Snoop Dogg (featuring Pharrell and Uncle Charlie Wilson) — "Beautiful"	
2004	Outkast	"Hey Ya!"	The Black Eyed Peas — "Hey Mama"; Chingy (featuring Ludacris and Snoop Dogg) — "Holidae Inn"; Nelly (featuring P. Diddy and Murphy Lee) — "Shake Ya Tailfeather"; Kanye West (featuring Syleena Johnson) — "All Falls Down"	
2005	Missy Elliott (featuring Ciara and Fatman Scoop)	"Lose Control"	Common — "Go"; Nas (featuring Olu Dara) — "Bridging the Gap"; Snoop Dogg (featuring Pharrell) — "Drop It Like It's Hot"; Kanye West — "Jesus Walks"	
2006	The Black Eyed Peas	"My Humps"	Common — "Testify"; Daddy Yankee — "Rompe"; Three 6 Mafia (featuring Young Buck, 8Ball and MJG) — "Stay Fly"; Kanye West (featuring Jamie Foxx) — "Gold Digger"	
2007	—N/a			
2008	Lil Wayne (featuring Static Major)	"Lollipop"	Mary J. Blige — "Just Fine"; Lupe Fiasco (featuring Matthew Santos) — "Superstar"; Flo Rida (featuring T-Pain) — "Low"; Kanye West (featuring Chris Martin) — "Homecoming"	
2009	Eminem	"We Made You"	Flo Rida (featuring Kesha) — "Right Round"; Jay-Z — "D.O.A. (Death of Auto-Tune)"; Asher Roth — "I Love College"; Kanye West — "Love Lockdown"	

=== 2010s ===
Recipients
Year (Note: Each year is linked to the article about the MTV Video Music Awards held that year.)	Winner(s)	Video	Nominees	Ref.
2010	Eminem	"Not Afraid"	B.o.B (featuring Hayley Williams) — "Airplanes"; Drake (featuring Kanye West, Lil Wayne and Eminem) — "Forever"; Jay-Z (featuring Swizz Beatz) — "On to the Next One"; Kid Cudi (featuring MGMT and Ratatat) — "Pursuit of Happiness"	
2011	Nicki Minaj	"Super Bass"	Chris Brown (featuring Lil Wayne and Busta Rhymes) — "Look at Me Now"; Lupe Fiasco — "The Show Goes On"; Lil Wayne (featuring Cory Gunz) — "6 Foot 7 Foot"; Kanye West (featuring Rihanna and Kid Cudi) — "All of the Lights"	
2012	Drake (featuring Lil Wayne)	"HYFR"	Childish Gambino — "Heartbeat"; Jay-Z and Kanye West — "Paris"; Nicki Minaj (featuring 2 Chainz) — "Beez in the Trap"; Kanye West (featuring Big Sean, Pusha T and 2 Chainz) — "Mercy"	
2013	Macklemore and Ryan Lewis (featuring Ray Dalton)	"Can't Hold Us"	A$AP Rocky (featuring 2 Chainz, Drake and Kendrick Lamar) — "Fuckin' Problems"; J. Cole (featuring Miguel) — "Power Trip"; Drake — "Started from the Bottom"; Kendrick Lamar — "Swimming Pools (Drank)"	
2014	Drake (featuring Majid Jordan)	"Hold On, We're Going Home"	Childish Gambino — "3005"; Eminem — "Berzerk"; Kanye West — "Black Skinhead"; Wiz Khalifa — "We Dem Boyz"	
2015	Nicki Minaj	"Anaconda"	Big Sean (featuring E-40) — "I Don't Fuck with You"; Fetty Wap — "Trap Queen"; Kendrick Lamar — "Alright"; Wiz Khalifa (featuring Charlie Puth) — "See You Again"	
2016	Drake	"Hotline Bling"	2 Chainz — "Watch Out"; Chance the Rapper (featuring Saba) — "Angels"; Desiigner — "Panda"; Bryson Tiller — "Don't"	
2017	Kendrick Lamar	"Humble"	Big Sean — "Bounce Back"; Chance the Rapper — "Same Drugs"; DJ Khaled (featuring Justin Bieber, Quavo, Chance the Rapper and Lil Wayne) — "I'm the One"; DRAM (featuring Lil Yachty) — "Broccoli"; Migos (featuring Lil Uzi Vert) — "Bad and Boujee"	
2018	Nicki Minaj	"Chun-Li"	Cardi B (featuring 21 Savage) — "Bartier Cardi"; The Carters — "Apeshit"; Drake — "God's Plan"; J. Cole — "ATM (Addicted to Money)"; Migos (featuring Drake) — "Walk It Talk It"	
2019	Cardi B	"Money"	2 Chainz (featuring Ariana Grande) – "Rule the World"; 21 Savage (featuring J. Cole) — "A Lot"; DJ Khaled (featuring Nipsey Hussle and John Legend) — "Higher"; Lil Nas X (featuring Billy Ray Cyrus) — "Old Town Road (Remix)"; Travis Scott (featuring Drake) — "Sicko Mode"	

=== 2020s ===
Recipients
Year (Note: Each year is linked to the article about the MTV Video Music Awards held that year.)	Winner(s)	Video	Nominees	Ref.
2020	Megan Thee Stallion	"Savage"	DaBaby – "Bop"; Eminem (featuring Juice Wrld) — "Godzilla"; Future (featuring Drake) — "Life is Good"; Roddy Ricch — "The Box"; Travis Scott — "Highest in the Room"	
2021	Travis Scott (featuring Young Thug and M.I.A.)	"Franchise"	Cardi B (featuring Megan Thee Stallion) – "WAP"; Drake (featuring Lil Durk) – "Laugh Now Cry Later"; Lil Baby (featuring Megan Thee Stallion) – "On Me (Remix)"; Moneybagg Yo – "Said Sum"; Polo G – "Rapstar"	
2022	Nicki Minaj (featuring Lil Baby)	"Do We Have a Problem?"	Eminem and Snoop Dogg – "From the D 2 the LBC"; Future (featuring Drake and Tems) – "Wait for U"; Kendrick Lamar – "N95"; Latto – "Big Energy"; Pusha T – "Diet Coke"	
2023	Nicki Minaj	"Super Freaky Girl"	Diddy (featuring Bryson Tiller, Ashanti and Yung Miami) – "Gotta Move On (Queens Remix)"; DJ Khaled (featuring Drake and Lil Baby) – "Staying Alive"; GloRilla and Cardi B – "Tomorrow 2"; Lil Uzi Vert – "Just Wanna Rock"; Lil Wayne (featuring Swizz Beatz and DMX) – "Kant Nobody"; Metro Boomin (featuring Future) – "Superhero (Heroes & Villains)"	
2024	Eminem	"Houdini"	Drake (featuring Sexyy Red and SZA) – "Rich Baby Daddy"; GloRilla – "Yeah Glo!"; Gunna – "FukUMean"; Megan Thee Stallion – "Boa"; Travis Scott (featuring Playboi Carti) – "Fe!n"	
2025	Doechii	"Anxiety"	Drake – "Nokia"; Eminem (featuring Jelly Roll) – "Somebody Save Me"; GloRilla (featuring Sexyy Red) – "Whatchu Kno About Me"; Kendrick Lamar – "Not Like Us"; LL Cool J (featuring Eminem) – "Murdergram Deux"; Travis Scott – "4x4"	
2026	Cardi B featuring Kehlani	"Safe"	Don Toliver – "E85"; Drake – "Janice STFU"; Megan Thee Stallion – "Lover Girl"; Travis Scott – "Dumbo"; Tyler, The Creator – "Sugar on My Tongue"	

== Statistics ==
=== Artists with multiple wins ===
5 wins

- Nicki Minaj

3 wins

- Drake
- Eminem

2 wins

- Outkast
- Lil Wayne
- Missy Elliott
- Cardi B

=== Artists with multiple nominations ===
16 nominations

- Drake

10 nominations

- Kanye West

9 nominations

- Eminem

7 nominations

- Lil Wayne

6 nominations

- Kendrick Lamar
- Nicki Minaj
- Travis Scott

5 nominations

- 2 Chainz
- Cardi B
- Megan Thee Stallion

4 nominations

- Busta Rhymes
- Jay-Z
- Missy Elliott
- Snoop Dogg

3 nominations

- Ashanti
- Big Sean
- The Black Eyed Peas
- Chance the Rapper
- DJ Khaled
- Future
- GloRilla
- J. Cole
- Kid Cudi
- Lil Baby
- Outkast
- P. Diddy
- Pharrell

2 nominations

- 21 Savage
- Bryson Tiller
- Childish Gambino
- Common
- Flo Rida
- Ja Rule
- Lauryn Hill
- Lil Uzi Vert
- Ludacris
- Lupe Fiasco
- Migos
- Nelly
- Pusha T
- Sexyy Red
- Swizz Beatz
- Wiz Khalifa

== See also ==
- MTV Europe Music Award for Best Hip-Hop
