= What Would You Do =

What Would You Do may refer to:

== Film and television ==
- What Would You Do? (1991 TV program), a 1991–1993 American children's game show
- What Would You Do? (2008 TV program), an American hidden-camera program
- What Would You Do? (film), a 1920 American silent drama film directed by Edmund Lawrence and Denison Clift

== Music ==
- "What Would You Do?" (City High song), 2001
- "What Would You Do?" (Tha Dogg Pound song), 1995
- "What Would You Do (If Jesus Came to Your House)", a song by Porter Wagoner, 1956; covered by Red Sovine the same year
- "What Would You Do?", a song by the Isley Brothers from Body Kiss, 2003
- "What Would You Do?", a song by Jim Reeves from According to My Heart, 1960
- "What Would You Do?", a song by Joel Corry, David Guetta and Bryson Tiller, 2022
- "What Would You Do", a song by Kelly Rowland from Simply Deep, 2002
- "What Would You Do", a song by Mariah Carey, 2003
- "What Would You Do?", a song by Tate McRae from I Used to Think I Could Fly, 2022
- "What Would You Do", a folk song with Roud number 3051

== See also ==
- "Wut Would You Do", a song by Eazy-E from Str8 off tha Streetz of Muthaphukkin Compton
- "WWYD?", a song by Against All Authority from Exchange
- "WWYD?", a song by DRAM from That's a Girls Name
- WWYD, former callsign of WVBN (FM)
