= Mirage World (app) =

Location-based augmented reality application

- Original author(s): Patrick Piemonte, Ryan Staake
- Initial release: August 2017; 7 years ago
- Operating system: iOS
- Website: mirage.world

Mirage World is an iOS app that allows users to add immersive media on top of the real world using augmented reality.

== History ==
Patrick Piemonte and Ryan Staake, who both used to work as user interface designers at Apple, created Mirage World and released it in August 2017. Upon its release, Mirage World was hailed as arguably the only app "to marry augmented reality's hidden-world appeal with social media's shareable, re-mixable content."

== Service ==
Mirage World is a location-based service. To add a "mirage" at a point of interest, the user takes their mobile phone camera and adorns the world around them with photos, text, graphics, emoji, drawings, and other immersive content using the app. The user can see the pointers of their own and other people's mirages with a mapping service where they are geocached. When the user gets close to a mirage, it appears on the display.

The mirages can contain interactive content such as hashtags that link to Twitter.

== See also ==
- Virtual graffiti
