= Wyclef Jean (song) =

Single by Young Thug

from the album Jeffery
- Released: August 26, 2016
- Recorded: August 2016
- Studio: Jungle City Studios (New York)
- Genre: Trap; reggae fusion
- Length: 3:56
- Label: 300; Atlantic
- Producers: TM88; Supah Mario

Young Thug singles chronology
"Spend It (Remix)" (2016)	"Wyclef Jean" (2016)	"Trap Trap Trap" (2017)

Music video
- "Wyclef Jean" on YouTube

"Wyclef Jean" (/ˈwaɪklɛf ˈʒɒn/ WY-klef ZHON) is a trap and reggae song by American rapper Young Thug. It is the opening track and second single from his fourth commercial mixtape, Jeffery, which was released by 300 Entertainment and Atlantic Records on August 26, 2016. The song was recorded at Jungle City Studios in the weeks leading up to the mixtape's release. Produced by TM88 and Supah Mario, its beat incorporates elements of Caribbean music, with critics comparing its style to that of the song's namesake, Haitian rapper Wyclef Jean.

A music video for the song was later released, which was co-directed by Young Thug and Ryan Staake, though Young Thug did not appear at the shoot. As a result, the music video consists of scenes which had been requested by Young Thug, divided by title cards detailing their improvised production. The video went viral, receiving widespread praise for its novelty, and won the MTV Video Music Award for Best Editing in 2017.

== Background ==
After releasing the mixtapes I'm Up and Slime Season 3 earlier in 2016, Young Thug announced his fourth commercial mixtape, Jeffery, on July 9. Leading up to its release, he temporarily changed his stage name to "No, My Name Is Jeffery". Speaking on the mixtape's title, he told Beats 1: "Jeffery is all about Jeffery. It ain’t even about Young Thug. Ain’t no Young Thug songs on there. The mixtape is a straight crossover."

"Wyclef Jean" is named after Haitian rapper Wyclef Jean, who Young Thug had long admired. Following Jeffery's release, Young Thug stated that each song was named after one of his idols. While most critics felt that the tracks bore no relation to their namesakes, Billboard's Matthew Ruiz wrote that "each song seems to take on the spiritual tone of each 'Idol' it name-checks".

Originally titled "Nascar", the song was recorded in early to mid-August 2016, at Jungle City Studios in New York City. The track was produced by TM88 and Supah Mario, mastered by Joe LaPorta, and mixed by Alexander Tumay. Young Thug, who often recorded songs and left them unfinished, was hesitant to complete the song. He sent the files to Tumay, who, upon hearing the recordings, insisted that Young Thug finish the song and include it on Jeffery.

== Composition and reception ==
Critics categorized "Wyclef Jean" as a trap and reggae song. It features a half-time reggae beat which is driven by a groovy bassline. Produced by TM88 and Supah Mario, the beat incorporates horns and a Jamaican-sounding backing chant. Writing for XXL magazine, Scott Glaysher said that the beat had "a distinct Caribbean vibe", and sounded like something that Wyclef Jean himself could rap over. Young Thug croons sexual boasts while "ad-libbing noises that resemble a human imitating a horse", according to The Guardian's Lanre Bakare. Young Thug's singing on the track is childlike, slurred, melodic, and full of attitude. His vocals on its bridge are soulful, while his vocals on its hook are nasal.

HotNewHipHop's Mitch Findlay described "Wyclef Jean" as "a shining point in Thug's discography", and praised its display of Young Thug's artistry. Duricy also praised the track, and considered it one of Jeffery's high points, while Bakare criticized the track for its vocal performance. Glaysher considered Young Thug's lyrics "nothing out of the ordinary", but praised the song's production.

== Release and commercial performance ==
"Wyclef Jean" is the opening track on Young Thug's mixtape Jeffery, which was released on August 26, 2016 via 300 Entertainment and Atlantic Records. It was sent to urban contemporary radio on January 24, 2017, as Jeffery's second single.

The song debuted and peaked at number 87 on the US Billboard Hot 100 chart dated September 17, 2016. It also peaked at number 32 on the US Hot R&B/Hip-Hop Songs chart and number 96 on the Canadian Hot 100 chart. The Recording Industry Association of America (RIAA) certified the single platinum, denoting one million units based on streams. It was also certified platinum by Music Canada, denoting 80 thousand units.

== Music video ==
Screenshot from the improvised music video

The music video for "Wyclef Jean" was co-directed by Young Thug and Ryan Staake of production company Pomp&Clout, and was released on January 16, 2017. It had a budget of $100,000, and was shot in October 2016. The video was produced almost entirely without the involvement of Young Thug; he arrived to the shoot 10 hours late, refused to film any scenes, and promptly left after finding out that his Instagram account had been hacked. Staake had never met Young Thug prior to the shoot, with their only communication being a recording sent by Young Thug outlining ideas for the music video.

Young Thug ひ
(@youngthug)
tweeted:

So no one was going to tell me that I won an award??

August 28, 2017

The music video was received positively and was met with praise for its novelty. It went viral, receiving over one million views within 24 hours of its release. The video won the MTV Video Music Award for Best Editing in 2017, marking Young Thug's first VMA win. The day after, Young Thug tweeted that he was unaware that he had won an award.

The video consists of title cards bluntly detailing the improvised production of each scene. Originally, Staake wanted the video to be of Young Thug lighting the $100,000 budget on fire, but Young Thug's record label was concerned with potential legal consequences. An audio recording of Young Thug's conversation with John Colombo, who was originally slated to direct the music video, was sent to Staake. The audio, in which the two discussed ideas for the video, was ultimately included in the music video. The music video consists of children dressed in police uniforms destroying police cars, models driving toy cars, and police threatening to shut down production. Young Thug's only appearance in the music video is a brief, self-directed clip of him eating Cheetos, which was sent to Staake two months after the video's shooting.

== Personnel ==
- Young Thug – vocals
- TM88 – programming
- Supah Mario – programming
- Joe LaPorta – mastering
- Alexander Tumay – mixing

== Charts ==
Chart performance for "Wyclef Jean"
Chart (2016)	Peak position
Canada (Canadian Hot 100)	96
US Billboard Hot 100	87
US Hot R&B/Hip-Hop Songs (Billboard)	32

== Certifications ==
Certifications for "Wyclef Jean"
Region	Certification	Certified units/sales
Canada (Music Canada)	Platinum	80,000^{‡}
New Zealand (RMNZ)	Gold	15,000^{‡}
United States (RIAA)	Platinum	1,000,000^{‡}
^{‡} Sales+streaming figures based on certification alone.
