= Patrick Piemonte =

American interface designer and computer scientist

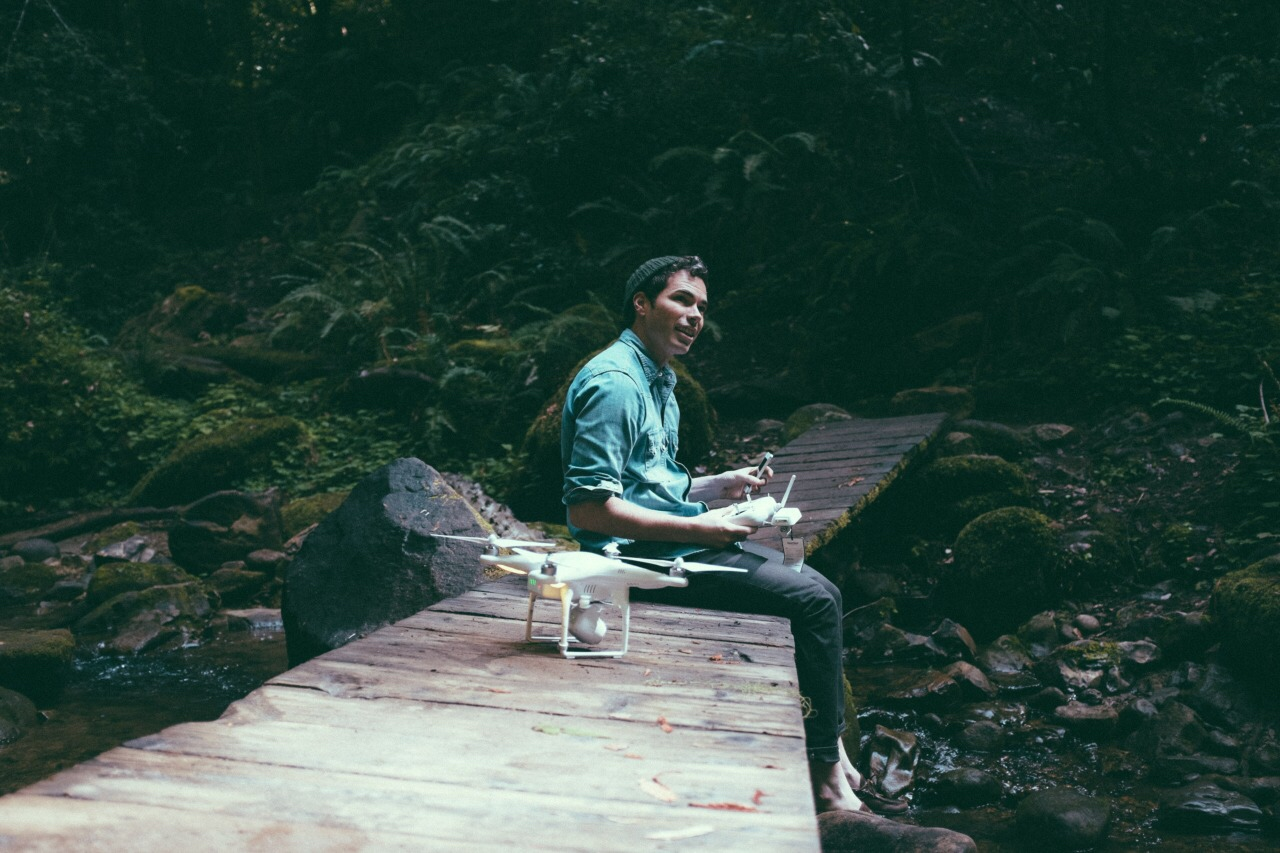
- Piemonte at Big Basin, 2013
- Education: Purdue University (B.S.); Carnegie Mellon University (M.S.)
- Scientific career
- Fields: Computer science, human–computer interaction
- Workplaces: Apple, Inc.
- Website: patrickpiemonte.com

Patrick Piemonte is an American inventor, computer scientist, and user interface designer best known for his contributions to the iPhone and iPad at Apple, as well as the launch of the Apple Vision Pro. He is listed as an inventor on more than 250 patents.

== Career ==
Piemonte worked at Apple Inc. from 2008 to 2013 as part of the iPhone team and from 2014 until 2016 as part of the Special Projects Group. His contributions include location-based services, iPhone's Core Motion software that leverages the gyroscope and motion coprocessor, the iPhone digital compass with ability to view True North, geocoding services, Flyover interface, 3D maps interface, turn-by-turn navigation interface, multi-touch gestures for 2D and 3D interaction with a map, the grid line interface under a data-less map, and iPhone's night mode interface. He was responsible for 3D user interface research using the iPhone gyroscope which contributed to the development of new interface techniques in iOS, such as parallax.

At the 2010 Worldwide Developers Conference keynote, Piemonte and his colleagues developed the first mobile game to demonstrate the iPhone's Core Motion software, which was featured on stage in a live demo by Steve Jobs.

In early 2017, Piemonte co-founded and launched Mirage World, an app for creating shared immersive media on top of the real world using augmented reality, with content creator Ryan Staake.
