= Big Baby DRAM =

Studio album by DRAM
- Released: October 21, 2016
- Genres: Hip-hop; R&B; neo soul
- Length: 52:22
- Labels: Empire; Atlantic
- Producers: Cardo; Charlie Heat; Chris McClenney; Cubeatz; Dan Stuckie; DRAM; Donnie Trumpet; Happy Perez; Heaven in Stereo; J Gramm; Juicy J; Karl Rubin; Louis Bell; Mike Dean; Nate Fox; Nico Chiara; Oz; Pablo Dylan; Ricky Reed; Rogét Chahayed; Roofeeo; Sak Pase; Sam Trax; Slade da Monsta; Sonny Digital; Watson the Great; Yung Exclusive

DRAM chronology
Google Play: Live at the Milk Jam Room (2016)	Big Baby DRAM (2016)	#1HappyHoliday (2017)

Singles from Big Baby DRAM
- 1. "Broccoli" Released: April 6, 2016; 2. "Cute" Released: July 29, 2016; 3. "Cash Machine" Released: September 9, 2016; 4. "Gilligan" Released: July 18, 2017

Big Baby DRAM is the debut studio album by American rapper DRAM. It was released on October 21, 2016, by Empire Distribution and Atlantic Records. The album features guest appearances from Young Thug, Erykah Badu, Lil Yachty, Playboi Carti, Trippie Redd, ASAP Rocky, and Juicy J, while the production was handled by Charlie Heat, Mike Dean, Ricky Reed, and Roofeeo, among others.

Big Baby DRAM received generally positive reviews from critics and debuted at number 19 on the US Billboard 200. The album was supported by four official singles: "Broccoli", "Cute", "Cash Machine", and "Gilligan".

== Promotion ==
"Broccoli" was released as the album's lead single on April 6, 2016. The song features a guest appearance from American rapper Lil Yachty, while the production was handled by J Gramm, with additional production by Rogét Chahayed and Karl Rubin. The song's accompanying music video premiered on July 22, 2016, on DRAM's YouTube account. On May 28, 2026, the single was certified Diamond by the Recording Industry Association of America (RIAA).

"Cute" was released as the album's second single on July 29, 2016. The track was produced by Charlie Heat.

"Cash Machine" was released as the album's third single on September 9, 2016. The track was produced by Ricky Reed. The music video for the single premiered on October 18, 2016.

"Gilligan" was first released for digital download on April 21, 2017. The song features guest appearances from American rappers ASAP Rocky and Juicy J. The song later sent to rhythmic contemporary radio on July 18, 2017, as the album's fourth single.

The album's first promotional single, "Ill Nana", was released on September 29, 2017. The song features a guest appearance from American rapper Trippie Redd.

The album's second promotional single, "Crumbs", was released on November 17, 2017. The song features a guest appearance from American rapper Playboi Carti.

== Critical reception ==
Professional ratings
Aggregate scores
Source	Rating
AnyDecentMusic?	7.5/10
Metacritic	80/100
Review scores
Source	Rating
AllMusic	4/5 stars
Clash	8/10
Consequence	B
The Guardian	4/5 stars
HipHopDX	3.7/5
Now	4/5
Pitchfork	7.8/10
Rolling Stone	3.5/5 stars
Spectrum Culture	3.75/5 stars
XXL	3/5

Big Baby DRAM was met with generally positive reviews. At Metacritic, which assigns a normalized rating out of 100 to reviews from professional publications, the album received an average score of 80, based on 13 reviews. Aggregator AnyDecentMusic? gave it 7.5 out of 10, based on their assessment of the critical consensus.

Neil Z. Yeung of AllMusic said, "Big Baby D.R.A.M. is, at times, odd and imperfect, which is part of the charm". James Kilpin of Clash said, "It's refreshing to hear something different and altogether more interesting from a slighter older but no less exciting name". Michael Madden of Consequence said, "It'll be interesting to see how those sorts of lyrics sound 10, 15, or 20 years down the line, but at the very least, Big Baby D.R.A.M.'s melodies and instrumentation are enough to ensure people will be listening to these songs for a while". Tim Jonze of The Guardian said, "The Virginia rapper's playfulness is frequently channelled through his talent for crafting delightfully weird pop". Eric Diep of HipHopDX said, "Big Baby D.R.A.M. is presented as a playlist of D.R.A.M.'s best conceptual songs rather than achieve the glory of playing a perfect album from front to back". Christine Clarke of Now said, "The dizzying array of styles and themes always entertain, and D.R.A.M.'s confidence as both a singer and rapper allows him to pull these threads together". August Brown of Los Angeles Times said, "With Big Baby D.R.A.M. he comes into his own, rapping with verve and sensitivity while fully capturing 2016's loopy, soulful moment in hip-hop. No wonder he's smiling".

Jon Caramanica of The New York Times said, "His excellent full-length debut album, Big Baby D.R.A.M., is joyous, clever and moves in surprising directions". Daniel Bromfield of Pretty Much Amazing said, "Big Baby D.R.A.M. makes it clear he's interested in a lot more than just writing breezy radio tunes. The only problem is that's unequivocally what he's best at". Jayson Greene of Pitchfork said, "D.R.A.M. doesn't really have new ideas to pitch into this ball pit, but on his full-length debut Big Baby D.R.A.M., he reminds us that new ideas aren't the whole game". Christopher R. Weingarten of Rolling Stone said, "Love or hate his broken style, he's the Biz Markie for the era where it goes down in the D.M." Scott Glaysher of XXL said, "Big Baby D.R.A.M. does have moments where tracks like "Sweet VA Breeze" and "WiFi" easily blend into each other, sounding a bit too similar. But those middling songs don't really hinder the overall replay value of the album".

=== Year-end lists ===
Select year-end rankings of Big Baby DRAM
Publication	List	Rank	Ref.
Complex	50 Best Albums of 2016	42	
The New York Times	The Best Albums of 2016 (Jon Caramanica)	14	

== Track listing ==
Credits adapted from the liner notes of Big Baby DRAM by Atlantic Records.

Big Baby DRAM track listing
No.	Title	Writer(s)	Producer(s)	Length
1.	"Get It Myself"	Shelley Massenburg-Smith; Nate Fox; Nico Segal	Fox; Donnie Trumpet	1:47
2.	"Misunderstood" (featuring Young Thug)	Massenburg-Smith; Jeffery Williams; Eric Frederic	Ricky Reed	3:31
3.	"In a Minute / In House"	Massenburg-Smith; Daniel Watson; Ronald LaTour; Daveon Jackson	Watson the Great; Cardo; Yung Exclusive	5:38
4.	"Monticello Ave"	Massenburg-Smith; Shama Joseph; Karl Brutus; Gabriel Niles	Sak Pase; Karl Rubin	4:24
5.	"WiFi" (featuring Erykah Badu)	Massenburg-Smith; Erica Wright; Niles; Samuel Aristil; Pablo Dylan	Dylan; Sam Trax; Gabe Niles^{[b]}	4:05
6.	"Cash Machine"	Massenburg-Smith; Frederic; Ray Robinson	Ricky Reed	3:01
7.	"Broccoli" (featuring Lil Yachty)	Massenburg-Smith; Miles McCollum; Brutus; Rogét Chahayed; Julian Gramma	J Gramm; Chahayed^{[b]}; Karl Rubin^{[b]}	3:45
8.	"Cute"	Massenburg-Smith; Ernest Brown III	Charlie Heat	4:01
9.	"Outta Sight / Dark Lavender Interlude"	Massenburg-Smith; Chris McClenney; Brutus	McClenney; Chahayed; Karl Rubin	5:53
10.	"Change My #"	Massenburg-Smith; Michael Dean	Mike Dean	4:24
11.	"Password"	Massenburg-Smith; Fox; Segal; Peter Cottontale; Rami Eadeh	Fox; Donnie Trumpet; Cottontale^{[b]}; Rami Beatz^{[b]}	2:25
12.	"100%"	Massenburg-Smith; Jahphet Landis; Louis Bell; Brutus; Ronald Isley; Ernest Isley; Rudolph Isley; O'Kelly Isley, Jr.; Vernon Isley; Marvin Isley; Christopher Jasper	Roofeeo; Bell; Karl Rubin	3:28
13.	"Sweet VA Breeze"	Massenburg-Smith; Chahayed; Daniel Gassman; Brutus; Steve Bassett; Robert Thompson	Dan Stuckie; Chahayed	3:37
14.	"Workaholic" (bonus track)	Massenburg-Smith; Mike Hobdy; Nathan Perez	Happy Perez	2:23
Total length:				52:22

Deluxe edition (bonus tracks)
No.	Title	Writer(s)	Producer(s)	Length
15.	"I Have a Dream"	Massenburg-Smith; Ozan Yildirim; Nico Chiara	Oz; Chiara	1:56
16.	"Crumbs" (featuring Playboi Carti)	Massenburg-Smith; Yildirim; Jordan Carter	Oz	2:36
17.	"Ill Nana" (featuring Trippie Redd)	Massenburg-Smith; Marcus Slade; Michael White IV	Slade da Monsta	3:16
18.	"Eyeyieyie"	Massenburg-Smith; Yildirim	Oz	2:42
19.	"Deep Down in My Heart"	Massenburg-Smith; Sonny Uwaezuoke; Dean	Sonny Digital; Dean	2:01
20.	"Daddy / Daddy, Pt. 2"	Massenburg-Smith; Uwaezuoke; Olatunji Ige	Sonny Digital (Part 1); Heaven in Stereo; Tunji Ige^{[b]} (Part 2)	6:28
21.	"Good Thang"	Massenburg-Smith; LaTour; Kevin Gomringer; Tim Gomringer	Cardo; Cubeatz	4:08
22.	"Gilligan" (featuring ASAP Rocky and Juicy J) (digital bonus track)	Massenburg-Smith; Rakim Mayers; Jordan Houston	DRAM; Juicy J	3:27
Total length:				78:56

Notes

- ^{^[a]} signifies a co-producer
- ^{^[b]} signifies an additional producer
- "Ill Nana" is stylized as "ILL Nana"

Sample credits

- "Cash Machine" contains a sample from "Hallelujah I Love Her So", as performed by Ray Charles.
- "100%" contains a sample from "The Highways of My Life", as performed by The Isley Brothers.
- "Sweet VA Breeze" contains an interpolation from "Sweet Virginia Breeze", as written and performed by Steve Bassett and Robert Thompson.

== Charts ==
=== Weekly charts ===
Chart performance for Big Baby DRAM
Chart (2016)	Peak position
Canadian Albums (Billboard)	55
US Billboard 200	19
US Top R&B/Hip-Hop Albums (Billboard)	12

=== Year-end charts ===
2017 year-end chart performance for Big Baby DRAM
Chart (2017)	Position
US Billboard 200	187

== Certifications ==
Certifications for Big Baby DRAM
Region	Certification	Certified units/sales
New Zealand (RMNZ)	Gold	7,500^{‡}
United States (RIAA)	Gold	500,000^{‡}
^{‡} Sales+streaming figures based on certification alone.

== Release history ==
Release dates and formats for Big Baby DRAM
Region	Date	Label	Format(s)	Edition	Ref.
Various	October 21, 2016	Empire; Atlantic	Digital download; streaming	Standard	
Various	April 28, 2017	Empire; Atlantic	Vinyl	Standard	
Various	December 1, 2017	Empire; Atlantic	Digital download; streaming	Deluxe	
