= DRAM (musician) =

American rapper and singer (born 1988)

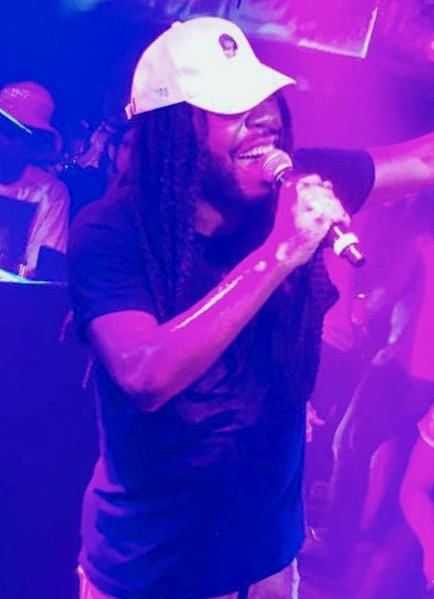
- DRAM performing in 2016

Background information
- Also known as: D.R.A.M.; Big Baby D.R.A.M.; Only 1 D.R.A.M.; Shelley FKA DRAM
- Born: Shelley Marshaun Massenburg-Smith; August 3, 1988 (age 38); Landstuhl, West Germany
- Origin: Hampton, Virginia, U.S.
- Genres: Hip-hop; R&B
- Occupations: Rapper; singer; songwriter; record producer
- Years active: 2009–present
- Labels: Waver; Atlantic; Empire; Love Renaissance
- Website: shelleyfkadram.com

Shelley Marshaun Massenburg-Smith (born August 3, 1988), known professionally as DRAM (/ˈdrɑːm/; an acronym for "does real-ass music", briefly Shelley FKA DRAM), (Note: Formerly stylized as D.R.A.M.; previously DRAMA J) is an American rapper, singer, and record producer. He is best known for his 2016 Diamond certified single, "Broccoli" (featuring Lil Yachty), which peaked at number five on the US Billboard Hot 100. The song preceded his debut studio album Big Baby DRAM (2016), which was released in October of that year by Atlantic Records.

== Early life ==
Massenburg-Smith was born in Landstuhl, West Germany. Before the age of one, he moved to the United States and was raised in Hampton, Virginia. His mother was in the military. As a teenager, Massenburg-Smith was an ardent fan of the singer Bilal and recalls discovering his unreleased second album Love for Sale when it leaked online in 2006, later citing the song "White Turns to Grey" as his favorite "hidden gem" in music.

== Career ==
In March 2015, DRAM released his debut EP, #1Epic through Atlantic Records and Empire Distribution. The EP included the single "Cha Cha", which peaked at number one on the Bubbling Under Hot R&B/Hip-Hop Singles chart. In October 2015, his debut mixtape, Gahdamn! was released.

In April 2016, DRAM released his hit single "Broccoli" (featuring Lil Yachty). The song gained international success and peaked at number five on the Billboard Hot 100, becoming his first top five song in the country. In October 2016, he appeared on The Tonight Show Starring Jimmy Fallon, performing "Blessings (Reprise)" with Chance the Rapper, Ty Dolla Sign, Anthony Hamilton, and Raury. His debut studio album, Big Baby DRAM, was released on October 21, 2016. The album received many positive reviews.

DRAM was featured on the single "Andromeda" from British virtual band Gorillaz for their fifth album, Humanz. He also provided uncredited guest vocals on the track "We Got the Power" from the same album.

== Other ventures ==
He voiced Wallace in the Adult Swim animated series, Lazor Wulf (2019–2021), which was also his voice acting debut.

== Personal life ==
Massenburg-Smith supported Jon Ossoff and Raphael Warnock in the 2020 United States Senate elections, performing at a rally for both in 2020.

== Discography ==
=== Studio albums ===
List of albums, with selected chart positions
Title	Album details	Peak chart positions				Certifications
Title	Album details	US	US R&B/HH	US Rap	CAN	Certifications
Big Baby DRAM	Released: October 21, 2016; Label: Atlantic, Empire; Format: CD, LP, digital download	19	12	10	55	RIAA: Gold; RMNZ: Gold
Shelley FKA DRAM	Released: April 30, 2021; Label: Atlantic, Empire; Format: CD, LP, digital download	—	—	—	—	
What Had Happened Was...	Released: November 10, 2022; Label: Waver; Format: CD, LP, digital download	—	—	—	—	

=== Extended plays ===
List of EPs, showing selected details
Title	Details	Peak chart positions
Title	Details	US
#1Epic	Released: March 3, 2015; Label: Atlantic, Empire; Format: Digital download	—
Google Play: Live at the Milk Jam Room	Released: July 15, 2016; Label: Atlantic, Empire; Format: Digital download	37
#1HappyHoliday	Released: November 24, 2017; Label: Atlantic, Empire; Format: Digital download	—
That's a Girls Name	Released: July 18, 2018; Label: Atlantic, Empire; Format: Digital download	—
Shake Tape	Released: May 1, 2026; Label: Waver; Format: Digital download	—
"—" denotes a recording that did not chart or was not released in that territory.

=== Mixtapes ===
List of mixtapes, showing selected details
Title	Details
Gahdamn!	Released: October 23, 2015; Label: Atlantic, Empire; Format: Digital download

=== Singles ===
==== As lead artist ====
List of singles, with showing year released, peak chart positions and album name
Title	Year	Peak chart positions								Certifications	Album
Title	Year	US	US R&B/ HH	US Rap	CAN	NL	SWE	UK	UK R&B	Certifications	Album
"Cha Cha"	2015	—	— (Note: "Cha Cha" did not enter the Hot R&B/Hip-Hop Songs chart, but peaked at number one on the Bubbling Under Hot R&B/Hip-Hop Singles chart.)	—	—	—	—	—	—		#1Epic
"Broccoli" (featuring Lil Yachty)	2016	5	1	1	23	87	60	93	13	RIAA: Diamond; BPI: Gold; MC: 3× Platinum; IFPI DAN: Gold; SNEP: Gold; FIMI: Gold; RMNZ: 2× Platinum	Big Baby DRAM
"Cute"	2016	—	—	—	—	—	—	—	—		Big Baby DRAM
"Cash Machine"	2016	—	— (Note: "Cash Machine" did not enter the Billboard Hot R&B/Hip-Hop Songs chart, but peaked at number six on the Bubbling Under R&B/Hip-Hop Singles chart.)	—	—	—	—	—	—	RIAA: Gold	Big Baby DRAM
"Gilligan" (featuring Juicy J and ASAP Rocky)	2017	—	—	—	—	—	—	—	—		Big Baby DRAM
"The Uber Song"	2017	—	—	—	—	—	—	—	—		Non-album singles
"Group Thang (Demo)"	2017	—	—	—	—	—	—	—	—		Non-album singles
"Ill Nana" (featuring Trippie Redd)	2017	—	—	—	—	—	—	—	—		Big Baby DRAM
"Crumbs" (featuring Playboi Carti)	2017	—	—	—	—	—	—	—	—		Big Baby DRAM
"The Lay Down" (with H.E.R. and Watt)	2019	—	—	—	—	—	—	—	—		Shelley FKA DRAM
"—" denotes a recording that did not chart or was not released in that territory.

==== As featured artist ====
Title	Year	Album
"For the Love Of" (DP featuring D.R.A.M.)	2015	Non-album single
"I Feel Your Pain" (Sbtrkt featuring D.R.A.M. and Mabel)	2016	Save Yourself
"Slappin" (E-40 featuring Nef the Pharaoh and D.R.A.M.)	2016	The D-Boy Diary (Deluxe Edition)
"Smokin' What I'm Smokin' On" (Mod Sun featuring D.R.A.M. and Rich the Kid)	2016	Movie
"1999" (Max Fullard featuring D.R.A.M.)	2016	Nights of the Fourth
"Girl At Coachella" (Matoma and Magic! featuring DRAM)	2017	Non-album single
"Andromeda" (Gorillaz featuring D.R.A.M.)	2017	Humanz
"Right Now" (Snakehips featuring ELHAE, D.R.A.M., and H.E.R.)	2017	Non-album single
"I'm On 3.0" (Trae tha Truth featuring T.I., Dave East, Tee Grizzley, Royce da 5'9", Currensy, D.R.A.M., Snoop Dogg, Fabolous, Rick Ross, Chamillionaire, G-Eazy, Styles P, E-40, Mark Morrison, and Gary Clark Jr.)	2017	Tha Truth, Pt. 3
"Everyday" (The Americanos featuring DRAM and Kyle)	2017	Non-album single
"Count Up" (Smokepurpp featuring D.R.A.M.)	2017	Deadstar
"All of Mine" (Young Dolph featuring D.R.A.M.)	2017	Thinking Out Loud
"Must've Been" (Chromeo featuring D.R.A.M.)	2018	Head over Heels
"Myself" (Snow Tha Product featuring DRAM)	2018	Non-album single
"Suavecito" (Yung Gravy featuring D.R.A.M.)	2018	Snow Cougar
"Put You On (MJ Cole Remix)" (Amber Mark featuring DRAM and MJ Cole)	2018	Non-album singles
"About You" (Valee featuring DRAM)	2018	Non-album singles
"It Gets Better" (GRiZ featuring D.R.A.M.)	2019	Ride Waves
"New Hawaii" (Injury Reserve featuring DRAM, Tony Velour and Dylan Brady)	2019	Injury Reserve
"Star (Shelley FKA DRAM Remix)" (Machinedrum featuring Tanerélle, Shelley FKA DRAM, and Mono/Poly)	2019	Non-album single
"Aight" (Westside Boogie featuring Shelley FKA DRAM)	2022	More Black Superheroes
"Keen" (Kimbra featuring DRAM)	2024	Idols & Vices (Vol. 1)

=== Other charted and certified songs ===
List of songs, with selected chart positions, showing year released and album name
Title	Year	Peak chart positions				Cerifications	Album
Title	Year	US Dance/ Elec.	CAN	IRE	NZ Heat.	Cerifications	Album
"Cash Out" (Calvin Harris featuring ScHoolboy Q, PartyNextDoor, and D.R.A.M.)	2017	20	94	67	1	MC: Gold	Funk Wav Bounces Vol. 1

=== Guest appearances ===
List of non-single guest appearances, with other performing artists, showing year released and album name
Title	Year	Other artist(s)	Album
"Caretaker"	2015	Donnie Trumpet & The Social Experiment	Surf
"the function."	2015	Remy Banks, World's Fair	higher.
"I Ain't Gotta Lie"	2015	Marvel Alexander, Louie P	Don't Die Yet
"Don't Talk About It"	2015	Michael Christmas	What a Weird Day
"Renovate"	2016	Allan Kingdom	Northern Lights
"Powerful (DRAM Remix)"	2016	Major Lazer, Ellie Goulding, Tarrus Riley	Peace Is the Mission: Remixes
"D.R.A.M. Sings Special"	2016	Chance the Rapper, Elle Varner	Coloring Book
"Chill Bill (Remix)"	2016	Rob Stone, Denzel Curry, Cousin Stizz	I'm Almost Ready
"People Want to Hear About Love"	2016	Neil Young, Lukas Nelson & Promise of the Real, Donnie Trumpet	Earth
"One More Chance"	2016	Salute	My Heart
"Bury Me"	2016	The Skins	Still Sleep
"Cash Out"	2017	Calvin Harris, ScHoolboy Q, PartyNextDoor	Funk Wav Bounces Vol. 1
"Fallin Down"	2017	Trae tha Truth	Tha Truth, Pt. 3
"Campfire"	2017	Neil Young	Bright: The Album
"I Like You"	2017	Childish Major, 6lack	WOO$AH
"I Miss You (DRAM Remix)"	2018	Clean Bandit, Julia Michaels	I Miss You (Remixes)
"Look Back"	2018	Diplo	California
"The Come Up"	2018	Smoke DZA	Not for Sale
"Gucci Plug"	2018	Nick Grant	Dreaming Out Loud
"Last December"	2018	Sunny & Gabe	Peace of Cake
"Communication"	2018	Arin Ray	Platinum Fire
"New Hawaii"	2019	Injury Reserve, Tony Velour, Dylan Brady	Injury Reserve
"Demon Hearts"	2019	Cruel Santino	Mandy & the Jungle
"Swang Remix"	2019	Pistola	Lost Tapes
"Fryman's Trail"	2019	Theo Martins	Cereal Sounds, Vol. 1
"Twinkle Twinkle Little Star"	2020	—	At home with the kids
"Litmas"	2020	Atlantic Holiday	Still Home For The Holidays
"Feliz Navidad"	2020	Love Renaissance, 6lack, Summer Walker, Young Rog	Home for the Holidays
"DO YOU GOT MOXIE?"	2021	Young Roc, Nassan	Function
"Feliz Navidad"	2022	Love Renaissance, 6lack, Summer Walker, Young Rog	Home for the Holidays, Vol. 2
"ungrateful you"	2023	Deem Spencer	adultSW!M
"Royal"	2023	Deante' Hitchcock, The Riverdale Love Choir	Once Upon a Time
"BONUS FANTASY"	2023	ATTNWH0RE	frkdout RADIO LP
"Jus Weed"	2023	Smoke DZA, The Smokers Club	Worldwide Smoke Session, Vol. 2
"I WANT YOU BUT YOU'LL NEVER KNOW..."	2023	Rory, Alex Isley	I Thought It'd Be Different
"Deposit"	2023	A$AP TyY	1840 LEX
"Bete Sauvage"	2023	Big Shot Manceeni	Bon Appetite
"Summer Nights"	2023	Will Hill	Looking At The Moon Through The Sunroof
"Ragtop Riches"	2023	Jay Worthy, Kamaiyah, Harry Fraud	THE AM3RICAN DREAM
"Overstand"	2023	Robb Bank$, Tony Shhnow	I Can't Feel My Face Too
"NO GAMES"	2023	Nnena	A WOMAN'S MIND
"Westside"	2024	Jay Worthy, DāM-FunK	Magic Hour
"Rich Showers"	2024	Smoke DZA, DJ Relly Rell, Steven Young	You're All Welcome
"Dram @ Drama"	2024	$amaad	Archie's Comic
"Uppy"	2024	Ellis Quinn, Matt Ox	Who's Counting Anyway? and 3
"COTTON CANDY"	2024	24hrs	RNB HRS
"Problem"	2025	Joelle Barzilay	Dear Diary, Vol. 1
"Full Speed"	2025	Terrace Martin, A$AP Ferg	Albion Files
"Why Should I"	2025	6ix, Juicy J, Guapdad 4000, Clint.	Homebody
"293"	2025	6ix, Guapdad 4000, Travis Stacey	Homebody
"All Season Long"	2025	Currensy, Harry Fraud, Jay Worthy	Never Catch Us
"Hills Have Eyes"	2025	JD Cliffe	misfit.
"Top That"	2025	Valee, Harry Fraud	EGONOMICS
"FWM"	2025	Aryee The Gem	Love Tap (Vol. 1)
"Wassup"	2025	Key!	So Emotional 2
"Is It Possible That The Honorable Elijah Muhammad Is Still Physically Alive????"	2025	Jay Electronica	A Written Testimony: Leaflets
"honey (DRAM's Quaalude)"	2025	Sol ChYld	ReBirth.Theory
"FOR CRASHING OUT"	2025	Twelve'len	Solace In the Night
"Road Rage"	2026	Tony Shhnow, YoDogg	Flood

== Awards and nominations ==
Year	Awards	Category	Nominated work	Result
2017	Grammy Awards	Best Rap/Sung Performance	"Broccoli" (with Lil Yachty)	Nominated
2017	iHeartRadio Music Awards	Best New Hip-Hop Artist	D.R.A.M.	Nominated
2017	Billboard Music Awards	Top Streaming Song (Audio)	"Broccoli" (with Lil Yachty)	Nominated
2017	Billboard Music Awards	Top Rap Song	"Broccoli" (with Lil Yachty)	Nominated
2017	Billboard Music Awards	Top Rap Collaboration	"Broccoli" (with Lil Yachty)	Nominated
2017	MTV Video Music Awards	Best Collaboration	"Broccoli" (with Lil Yachty)	Nominated
2017	MTV Video Music Awards	Best Hip Hop Video	"Broccoli" (with Lil Yachty)	Nominated
2018	Grammy Awards	Best Dance Recording	"Andromeda" (with Gorillaz)	Nominated
