= Cash Out (Calvin Harris song) =

Song by Calvin Harris featuring Schoolboy Q, PartyNextDoor and DRAM

from the album Funk Wav Bounces Vol. 1
- Released: June 30, 2017
- Genre: Funk; disco
- Length: 3:55
- Label: Columbia
- Songwriters: Adam Wiles; Brittany Hazzard; Quincy Hanley; Shelley Massenburg-Smith; Rogét Chahayed
- Producer: Calvin Harris

"Cash Out" is a song by Scottish DJ and record producer Calvin Harris featuring American rapper Schoolboy Q, Canadian singer PartyNextDoor, and American singer DRAM. The song was produced by Harris himself, and features additional contributions from Candice Pillay, Starrah, Rogét Chahayed, David "Prep" Hughes, Dave Kutch, and Marcos Tovar. It was released on 30 June 2017, through Columbia Records, as the second track to Harris' fifth studio album, Funk Wav Bounces Vol. 1.

== Critical reception ==
Upon the release of Funk Wav Bounces Vol. 1, the song was positively received by music critics. Spectrum Culture referred to the song as a "disco ball aficionado", while The Arts Desk noted how the song was "persuasively funky." On the contrary, The Standard called the song "cheesy" and compared it to "a Will Smith B-side."

== Commercial performance ==
Following the release of Funk Wav Bounces Vol. 1, "Cash Out" debuted at number 20 on the US Billboard Hot Dance/Electronic Songs chart. It additionally charted at number 94 on the Canadian Hot 100 and number 67 on the Irish Singles Chart, and ultimately peaked at number 1 on the New Zealand Hot Singles chart. It would later be certified Gold by Music Canada (MC) for equivalent sales of 40,000 units in the country.

== Charts ==
Chart (2017)	Peak position
Canada Hot 100 (Billboard)	94
Ireland (IRMA)	67
New Zealand (Recorded Music NZ)	1
US Hot Dance/Electronic Songs (Billboard)	20

== Certifications ==
Certifications for "Cash Out"
Region	Certification	Certified units/sales
Canada (Music Canada)	Gold	40,000^{‡}
^{‡} Sales+streaming figures based on certification alone.
