= That's a Girls Name =

EP by DRAM
- Released: July 18, 2018
- Genres: Soul; funk; Hip-hop
- Length: 9:20
- Labels: Empire; Atlantic
- Producers: Josh Abraham; Oligee

DRAM chronology
#1HappyHoliday (2017)	That's a Girls Name (2018)	Shelley FKA DRAM (2021)

That's a Girls Name is the fourth EP by American rapper DRAM, released on July 18, 2018, via Empire and Atlantic Records. Produced by Josh Abraham and Oligee, it was a surprise release, and consists of three songs that were characterized by Stereogum as "deeply goofy and fun takes on '80s soul".

== Music ==
The EP's opening track, "Best Hugs", is a "shimmery adult-contempo synth-glide" that is an "ode to another person's girlfriend", while the second song "WWYD?" contains a "cocktail bar" feel with "canned" horn accompaniment that features "amateurish rapping" from DRAM. The third and final track, "Sundress", features a prominent, funky bassline and was considered to be influenced by Prince. The release was called "inspired by hugs, carwashes, construction workers and Twitter" with witty lyrics.

== Critical reception ==
Professional ratings
Review scores
Source	Rating
RapReviews	7.5/10

Stereogum and Paste found the three tracks "very, very good", with Paste further calling the EP "profoundly goofy, in true DRAM style, and it plays on '80s soul vibes". Clash judged it to be an EP of "irresistible Summer funk", while Consequence of Sound stated that its tracks have DRAM "compellingly embracing elements of soul and hip-hop". Spin called the EP a "typically bubbly and optimistic group of poppy hip-hop songs". RapReviews said, "...[as far] as extended plays go, this one is definitely worth going out of your way for.

== Track listing ==
That's a Girls Name track listing
No.	Title	Length
1.	"Best Hugs"	3:11
2.	"WWYD?"	2:55
3.	"Sundress"	3:14
Total length:		9:20

== Personnel ==
- Theo Martins – artwork
- Asato Iida – photography
