= Broccoli (song) =

Single by DRAM featuring Lil Yachty

from the album Big Baby DRAM
- B-side: "Cha Cha"
- Released: April 6, 2016
- Recorded: March 2016
- Genre: Hip hop; trap
- Length: 3:45
- Label: Atlantic; Empire
- Songwriters: Shelley Massenburg-Smith; Miles McCollum; Rogét Chahayed; Julian Gramma
- Producers: J Gramm; Chahayed; Karl Rubin

DRAM singles chronology
"Cha Cha" (2015)	"Broccoli" (2016)	"Cute" (2016)

Lil Yachty singles chronology
"Minnesota" (2016)	"Broccoli" (2016)	"1500" (2016)

Music video
- "Broccoli" on YouTube

"Broccoli" is a song by American rapper DRAM featuring Lil Yachty, released on April 6, 2016, by Atlantic Records and Empire Distribution as the lead single from DRAM's debut studio album, Big Baby DRAM. It was produced by J. Gramm, with Rogét Chahayed as co-producer. It received a Grammy Award nomination for Best Rap/Sung Collaboration at the 59th Annual Grammy Awards.

== Background and release ==
The song was released for digital download as a single on April 6, 2016. It is the first single from DRAM's debut studio album, Big Baby DRAM, which was released in October 2016. A limited edition picture disc 7" vinyl version of the song was released on November 25, as part of Record Store Day's Black Friday sale. In an interview with Genius, DRAM spoke on the creation process behind the song:

"I was first introduced to Yachty through Rick Rubin. I was in Shangri La and Rick asked me if he could bring Yachty through. We linked and played each other music. A good month later, one of my main camera guys was following Yachty around during his SXSW run and I came about during the conversation. We exchanged numbers and I saw he was in LA, so I called him and he answered on the first fucking ring. He came to the studio and we had the loop of this going. We weren’t sure on what was going to make it carry over. At first, it was the piano with the drum loop, we had the flute and when that went in, everyone started vibing. Yachty started on his verse and I didn’t have any bars at first so I told him to go in. When he left, I didn’t even have my verse, I just had the bridge."

"Broccoli" debuted at number 87 on US Billboard Hot 100 for the chart dated July 2, 2016. It rose to number 65 on the Hot 100 the following week and has peaked at number 5, making it DRAM and Lil Yachty's first top 5 entry. As of January 2017, the song has sold 1,104,000 copies in the United States. The song was certified Diamond by the Recording Industry Association of America (RIAA) on May 28, 2026, for combined sales and streaming-equivalent points of ten million units in the United States.

== Critical reception ==
James Grebey of Spin said "the pair’s affable, clever rapping is a delight over the beat, which switched from a grizzled boom to some flighty, Kirby’s Dreamland-esque twinkling." Pitchfork's Marcus J. Moore opined, "D.R.A.M. comes through with his usually energetic rhymes, proclaiming his territory while giving the track even more punch." The same magazine listed "Broccoli" on their ranking of the 100 best songs of 2016 at number 33. The track was named the 47th best song of the year on Rolling Stone's "50 Best Songs of 2016" list. Billboard ranked "Broccoli" at number three on their "100 Best Pop Songs of 2016" list. In the annual Village Voice's Pazz & Jop mass critics poll of the year's best in music in 2016, "Broccoli" was ranked at number 26.

== Sampling ==
The song was sampled in the Beyoncé 2018 Coachella performance. It samples "No Drama" performed by Phemza The Kween featuring Klondike Blonde.

== Music video ==
The song's accompanying music video premiered on July 22, 2016, on DRAM's YouTube account. The video makes extensive use of wiggle stereoscopy. As of May 2025, the music video has 467 million views on YouTube.

== Track listing ==
- Empire — 8891526038 — Record Store Day limited edition 7" vinyl

Side A
No.	Title	Length
1.	"Broccoli" (featuring Lil Yachty)	3:45

Side B
No.	Title	Length
1.	"Cha Cha"	4:10

== Charts ==
=== Weekly charts ===
Chart (2016–2017)	Peak position
Australia (ARIA)	61
Belgium (Ultratop 50 Flanders)	45
Belgium (Ultratip Bubbling Under Wallonia)	28
Canada Hot 100 (Billboard)	23
Czech Republic Singles Digital (ČNS IFPI)	85
France (SNEP)	198
Netherlands (Single Top 100)	80
New Zealand (Recorded Music NZ)	35
Portugal (AFP)	66
Slovakia Singles Digital (ČNS IFPI)	88
Sweden (Sverigetopplistan)	60
UK Singles (OCC)	93
US Billboard Hot 100	5
US Hot R&B/Hip-Hop Songs (Billboard)	1
US Pop Airplay (Billboard)	22
US Rhythmic Airplay (Billboard)	1

=== Year-end charts ===
Chart (2016)	Position
Canada (Canadian Hot 100)	85
US Billboard Hot 100	34
US Hot R&B/Hip-Hop Songs (Billboard)	8
US Rhythmic (Billboard)	27

Chart (2017)	Position
US Billboard Hot 100	70
US Hot R&B/Hip-Hop Songs (Billboard)	87

== Certifications ==
Region	Certification	Certified units/sales
Canada (Music Canada)	3× Platinum	240,000^{‡}
Denmark (IFPI Danmark)	Gold	45,000^{‡}
France (SNEP)	Gold	66,666^{‡}
Italy (FIMI)	Gold	25,000^{‡}
New Zealand (RMNZ)	2× Platinum	60,000^{‡}
United Kingdom (BPI)	Gold	400,000^{‡}
United States (RIAA)	Diamond	10,000,000^{‡}
^{‡} Sales+streaming figures based on certification alone.
