= Ryan Staake =

American director

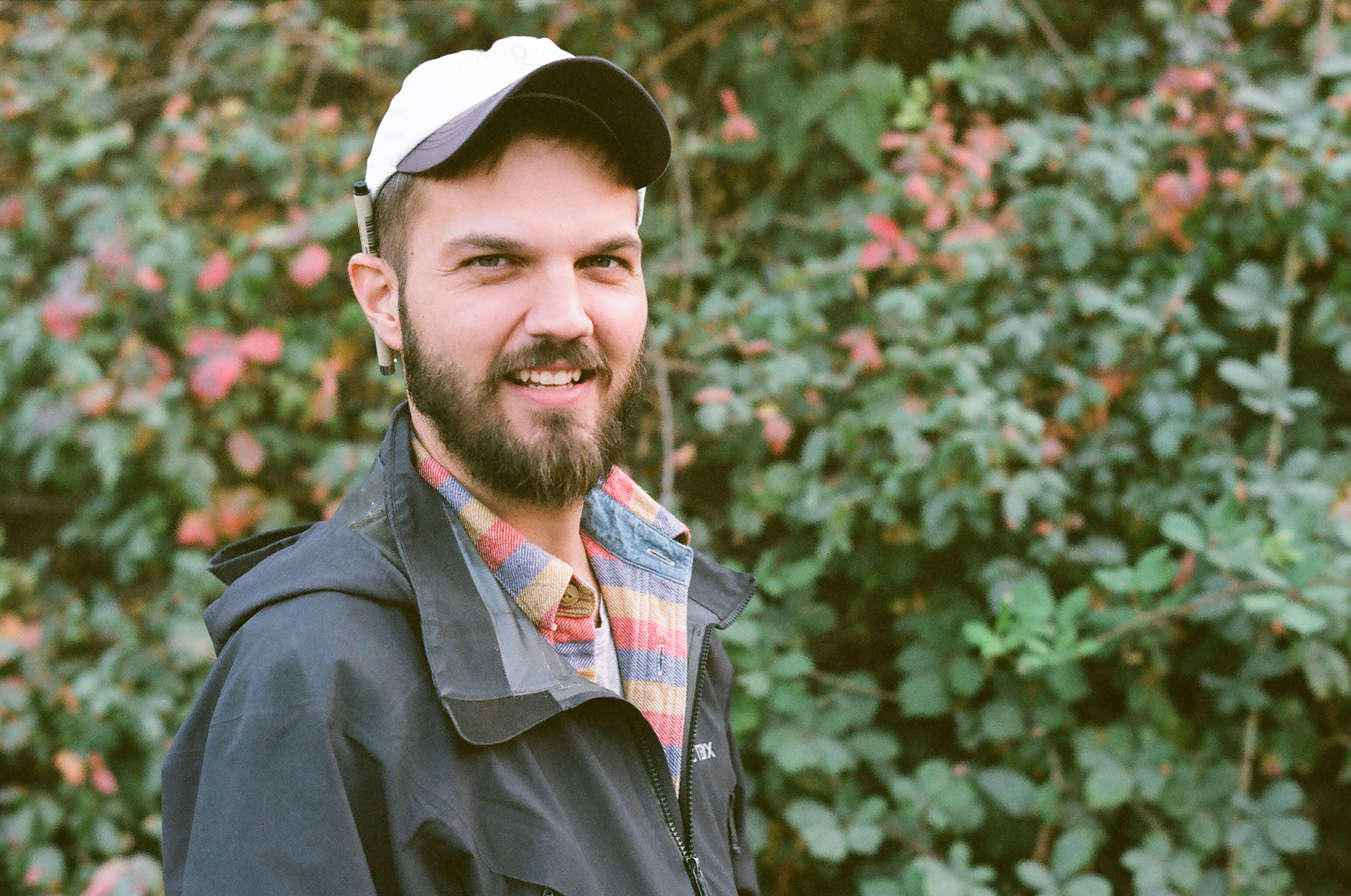
- Born: Los Angeles, CA, U.S.
- Occupations: Director; Designer; Business Owner

Ryan Staake is an American director. Staake has worked in video, interactive, virtual reality, and print.

== Early life ==
Staake was born in Los Angeles, CA, but grew up in St. Louis, Missouri. At a young age, his father, Illustrator Bob Staake, introduced him to Macs and digital imaging tools like Photoshop. Staake initially attended Carnegie Mellon University in Pittsburgh, PA, studying Communication Design, before transferring to Rhode Island School of Design in Providence, RI to major in Graphic Design.

== Career ==
=== Pomp&Clout ===
Staake founded design and video practice, Pomp&Clout.

=== "Wyclef Jean" ===
Staake edited and directed the music video for the Young Thug song "Wyclef Jean." The video only features Young Thug for a few seconds, after the $100k shoot was derailed by Thug arriving late, then refusing to get out of his car because his "Instagram account was hacked." Instead of abandoning the project after Thug failed to show up, co-director Staake completed a snarky cut that shows how the video fell apart and breaks down the rise and fall of the video's creation. Recordings of Thug detailing his ideas for the video are played over the top of the track, accompanied by text that further explains how the shoot turned into an expensive catastrophe for 300 Entertainment. An altercation between Thug's camp and the LAPD even occurred during shooting so Pomp&Clout opted instead to use B-roll footage for the final video. Of the project, Staake said, "I was trying to deliver to make an interesting statement, but also fulfill a contractual obligation." The video received more than a million views in the first 24 hours after it was released on the internet and Staake, along with co-editor Eric Degliomini, won the 2017 MTV Video Music Award for Best Editing for their work on Wyclef Jean.

=== Entertainment ===
The positive reaction to the Young Thug video resulted in Staake being tapped to begin developing feature films and TV shows, and he was signed to The Gotham Group in 2017.

=== Mirage ===
In early 2017, Staake co-founded Mirage Worlds, Inc. with Patrick Piemonte.

== Filmography ==
- Ed Sheeran, Chance the Rapper & PnB Rock: Cross Me (2019)
- Charli XCX & Troye Sivan: 1999 (2018)
- Young Thug: Wyclef Jean (2017)
- ScHoolboy Q ft. E-40: Dope Dealer (2016)
- Clams Casino Ft Vince Staples: All Nite (2016)
- Yili: Jay Chou Kinetic Milk (2016)
- Lil Wayne & Charlie Puth - Nothing But Trouble (2015)
- J. Cole - Wet Dreamz (2015)
- Caribou - Our Love (2014)
- Alt-J: Left Hand Free (2014)
- Steve Aoki & Diplo & Deorro - Freak (2014)
- The Asteroids Galaxy Tour - My Club (2014)
- Booka Shade - Crossing Borders (2014)
- Route 94 - My Love (2014)
- A-Trak and Tommy Trash: Tuna Melt (2013)
- Major Lazer: Sweat (2013)
- Magnet - Hook N Sling (2013)
- Acid Youths - David Heartbreak (2013)
- A-Trak - Tuna Melt (2013)
- Diplo: Set It Off feat Lazerdisk - Party Sex (2012)
- Portable Sunsets - California (2012)
- A1 - Darkside (2012)
- Nick Hook - Sirens (2012)
- Nadastrom - !II (2012)
- The Suzan - Devils (2011)
- Telephoned - Hold Me (2011)
- Gucci Vump - Shashtilism (2011)
- The Suzan - Home (2011)
- Zoos of Berlin - Electrical Way (2011)
- Dre Skull - I Want You (2010)
- Rusko - Woo Boost (2010)
- Boys Noize - Jeffer (2010)
- Congorock - Babylon (2010)
- Designer Drugs - Dead Meat (2010)
