= Clay pigeon (disambiguation) =

A clay pigeon is the target used in the sport of clay pigeon shooting.

Clay pigeon may also refer to:

== Film ==
- Clay Pigeon (film), a 1971 American action film
- The Clay Pigeon, a 1949 film noir
- Clay Pigeons, a 1998 film

== Songs ==
- "Clay Pigeon", a song by Binki on the 2021 EP Motor Function
- "Clay Pigeons", a song by Blaze Foley

== Other uses ==
- Clay pigeon floor procedure, a strategy used in the U.S. Senate

== See also ==
- The Clay Bird, a 2002 film
