= New Glow =

Studio album by Matt and Kim
- Released: April 7, 2015
- Recorded: 2013–15
- Genre: Dance-pop
- Length: 27:47
- Label: Harvest Records
- Producers: Andrew Dawson; Jesse Shatkin; Lars Stalfors

Matt and Kim chronology
Lightning (2012)	New Glow (2015)	We Were the Weirdos (2016)

Singles from New Glow
- 1. "Get It" Released: January 13, 2015

New Glow is the fifth studio album by American duo Matt and Kim, consisting of singer and keyboardist Matt Johnson and drummer Kim Schifino. Following the self-recorded Lightning (2012), New Glow features production and engineering contributions from Jesse Shatkin, Andrew Dawson, and Lars Stalfors, who produced the duo's self-titled debut. It is a dance-pop record that contains more cues from mainstream styles than previous releases, and is lyrically about Johnson and Schifino's relationship. Released by Harvest Records on April 7, 2015, it reached the top 40 of the American Billboard 200 chart and the top five on the Top Rock Albums and Independent Albums charts. Critical reviews were mixed. Although certain journalists enjoyed New Glow as a fun album, it was generally considered their weakest release due to its move towards a mainstream polished sound and drying-out of a simple formula.

== Background and composition ==
New Glow was written and recorded in a year-and-a-half process, which started in December 2013 with Matt & Kim not intending to create another album. Johnson explained in an interview with The Aquarian Weekly, "We just thought, 'Hey, let’s make one cool song.' Then it turned into, 'Let’s make another song!' And then eventually it turned into an album I guess." The tracks were planned to be released separately, but Johnson became too impatient and wanted the public to hear them at the same time. Of the 60 songs the duo worked on, only the last ten encompass New Glow. Although their previous album Lightning (2012) was self-produced, Matt & Kim had assistance from three professionals for New Glow: Lars Stalfors, who previously produced the duo's self-titled debut LP, Jesse Shatkin, and Andrew Dawson.

With New Glow, Matt & Kim intended to capture their love of various popular musical styles that they felt they successfully did in their live shows but never in recording format. New Glow is a dance pop record that takes cues from punk, hip-hop, and electronic dance music; although the high-pitched shouty singing and energetic synthesizer lines typical of Matt & Kim are prevalent, it embraces much more mainstream styles than Matt and Kim's previous punk-influenced works. The A.V. Club categorized it as a mixture of the slick club sound of Sidewalks with the indie dance stylings of the group's other work. "Get It" is an amalgamation of electronic rock with trap and trip-hop, where Johnson sings about partying until the morning starts.

Lyrically, New Glow deals with Johnson and Schifino's relationship and is the first Matt & Kim record to detail it heavily. Johnson described "Hey Now" as a "celebration" of Schifino's inspiration on him, and the features the line "If I died I’d die right by your side". "I See Ya" is about the difficulty of keeping friendships and family relationships together while having a busy touring schedule.

== Release and promotion ==
On January 13, 2015, New Glow and a supporting tour was announced, and the album's cover art was revealed; "Get It" also premiered that day. "Get It" and "Make a Mess" were performed live on Jimmy Kimmel Live! on April 20, 2015. A lyric video for "Hoodie On", released on February 24, 2015, depicts the Johnson and Schifino wearing hoodies and skateboarding throughout Los Angeles, including a restaurant from It's Always Sunny in Philadelphia (2005–present) named Paddy's Pub. The video for "Can You Blame Me?" premiered on December 15, 2015. It was created with the help of the group's fans; Johnson and Schifino filmed headshots of themselves lip-syncing to the song, and fans recorded themselves performing various activities while holding an iPad playing the headshot footage near their faces. Harvest Records released New Glow on April 7, 2015, and its nationwide tour ran from April 15 to May 22, 2015.

== Reception ==
Professional ratings
Aggregate scores
Source	Rating
AnyDecentMusic?	5.1/10
Metacritic	52/100
Review scores
Source	Rating
AllMusic	2.5/5 stars
The A.V. Club	C–
Consequence of Sound	C–
Exclaim!	6/10
MusicOMH	2/5 stars
Now	NN
Pitchfork	4.6/10
Rolling Stone	2.5/5 stars
Under the Radar	7/10 stars

Johnson reported that New Glow gained Matt & Kim "our largest audience yet and it's definitely had the most radio plays of all our albums in the States". It reached number 33 on the American Billboard 200 chart, number three on the Independent Albums chart, and number five on the Top Rock Albums chart. Additionally, "Get It" reached number 25 on the Alternative Airplay chart and 46 on the Hot Rock Songs chart.

However, the album received mixed reviews from critics upon release, garnering an aggregate 52/100 from Metacritic based on nine reviews. Jon Dolan, writing for Rolling Stone, enjoyed it as the duo's catchiest record yet, but also stated that "their all-smiles assault can be adorable, at least in moderate doses", but gets tiring after repeat listens. Corey Henderson of Exclaim! and Hays Davis of Under the Radar also called it a fun record, although Henderson argued it suffered from a monotonous sound.

Several reviewers found New Glow weaker than previous Matt & Kim albums. One reason was the polished mainstream sound that departed from the energy and spirit of their past releases, with reviewers considered signature to Matt & Kim's quality. Others considered it their worst record for the re-use of their simplistic compositional and lyrical style, to the point where it lost its luster and made the material sound amateur. Evan Rytlewski's review for Pitchfork concluded with an appeal to both opinions: "New Glow may be Matt & Kim’s most polished album, but their songwriting has never been more amateurish." Chris Mincher of The A.V. Club suggested that "the duo's well of shallow melodies has finally dried up" and summarized that "on New Glow, they've either finally dumbed things down too much, or simply reached the end of where this rudimentary songwriting can take them". As Katherine Flynn of Consequence of Sound advised, "Matt and Kim should maybe question the wisdom of eschewing the richness of their own wealth of experience in favor of whatever the kids are listening to these days."

Although, the sound and style were given positive comments. Davis highlighted the amount of detail, "Not Alone" in particular showcasing the "full range of Johnson’s palette, with sections of keys, string accents, and bass fuzz, and drummer Kim Schifino tearing along beside him". Mincher felt New Glow successfully combined the popular styles and Matt & Kim's indie style.

== Track listing ==
All tracks are written by Matt Johnson and Kim Schifino.

New Glow
No.	Title	Length
1.	"Hey Now"	2:50
2.	"Stirred Up"	2:41
3.	"Can You Blame Me"	2:32
4.	"Hoodie On"	2:24
5.	"Make A Mess"	2:11
6.	"Killin' Me"	3:09
7.	"World Is Ending"	3:15
8.	"Get It"	3:02
9.	"Not Alone"	3:02
10.	"I See Ya"	2:41
Total length:		27:47

== Credits and personnel ==
Credits adapted from the liner notes of New Glow.

Locations

- All tracks except "Get It" were mixed and engineered at Infrasonic Sound in Los Angeles, California
- "Get It" was recorded and mixed by Andrew Dawson at SoundEQ Studios in Los Angeles, California and The Rib Cage, Los Angeles, California
- Mastered at Sterling Sound in New York City, New York

Matt & Kim

- Matt Johnson – producer
- Kim Schifino – artwork and design

Other

- Lars Stalfors – producer, mixer and engineer
- Jesse Shatkin – producer on "Get It"
- Andrew Dawson – producer and mixer on "World is Ending"
- Mike Malchicoff – assistant engineer
- Jack Becerra – assistant engineer
- Joe LaPorta – mastering
- Sydney Nichols – layout
- Kalani Fujimori – band design logo

== Charts ==
Weekly chart performance for New Glow
Chart (2015)	Peak position
US Billboard 200	33
US Independent Albums (Billboard)	3
US Top Rock Albums (Billboard)	5
