= Grand Street and Grand Avenue =

Avenue in Brooklyn and Queens, New York

Grand Street Grand Avenue
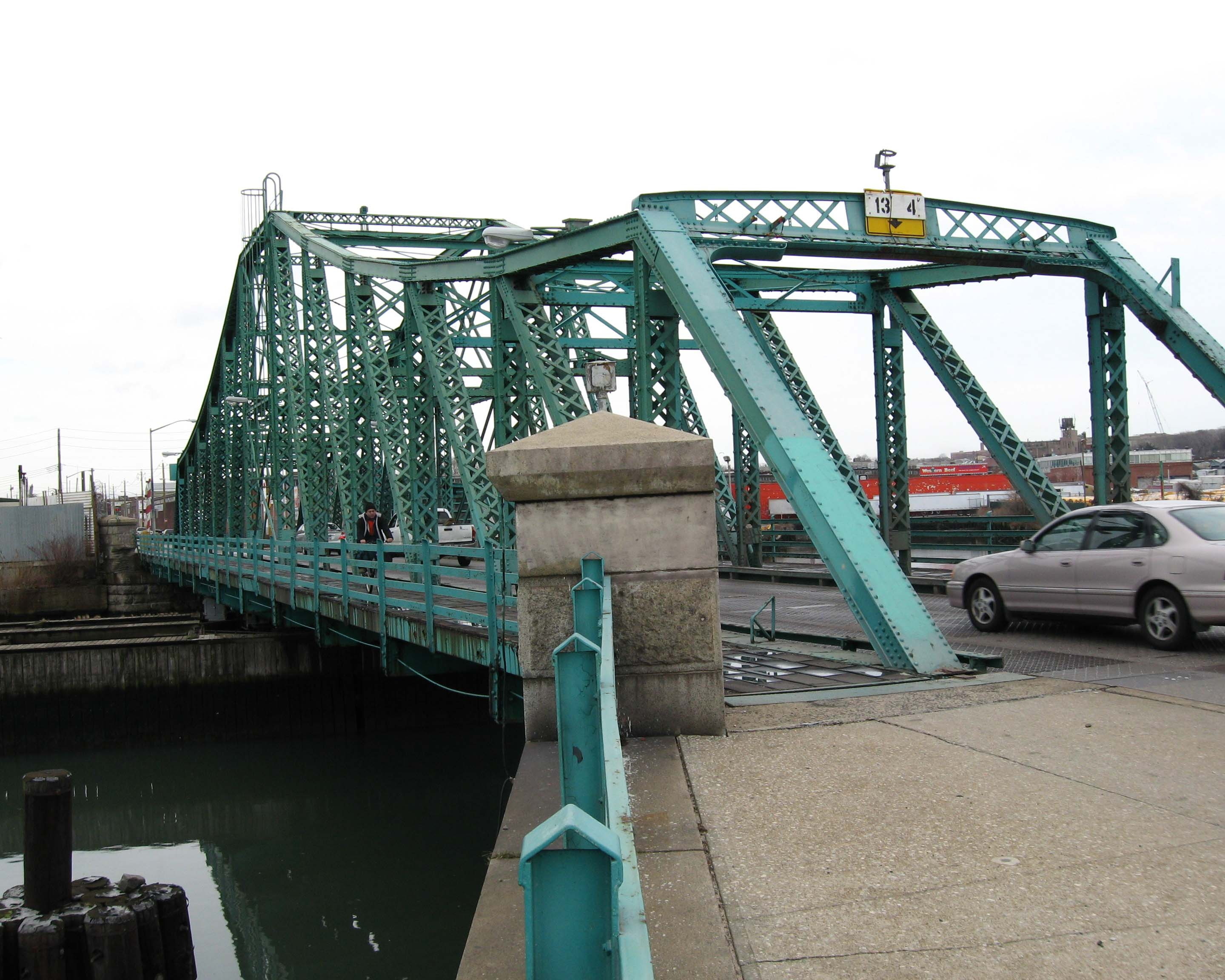
- The Grand Street Bridge over the Newtown Creek, as seen from Brooklyn side
- Interactive map of Grand Street; Grand Avenue
- Owner: City of New York
- Maintained by: NYCDOT
- Length: 4.4 mi (7.1 km); 1.7 mi (2.74 km) as Grand Street; 2.9 mi (4.67 km) as Grand Avenue additional 3.8 mi (6.12 km) as Broadway
- Location: Brooklyn, Queens
- Postal code: 11211, 11206, 11378, 11373
- Nearest metro station: Grand Street; Grand Avenue–Newtown
- West end: Rodney Street in Williamsburg
- Major junctions: I-495 in Maspeth
- East end: NY 25 (Queens Boulevard) / Broadway in Elmhurst

Grand Street and Grand Avenue are the respective names of a street which runs through the boroughs of Brooklyn and Queens, New York City, United States. Originating in Williamsburg, Brooklyn, Grand Street runs roughly northeast until crossing Newtown Creek into Queens, whereupon Grand Street becomes Grand Avenue, continuing through Maspeth where it is a main shopping street, until reaching its northern end at Queens Boulevard in Elmhurst.

The thoroughfare continues north and west beyond Queens Boulevard as Broadway until it terminates at Socrates Sculpture Park at the intersection of Vernon Boulevard in Astoria.

== Transportation ==
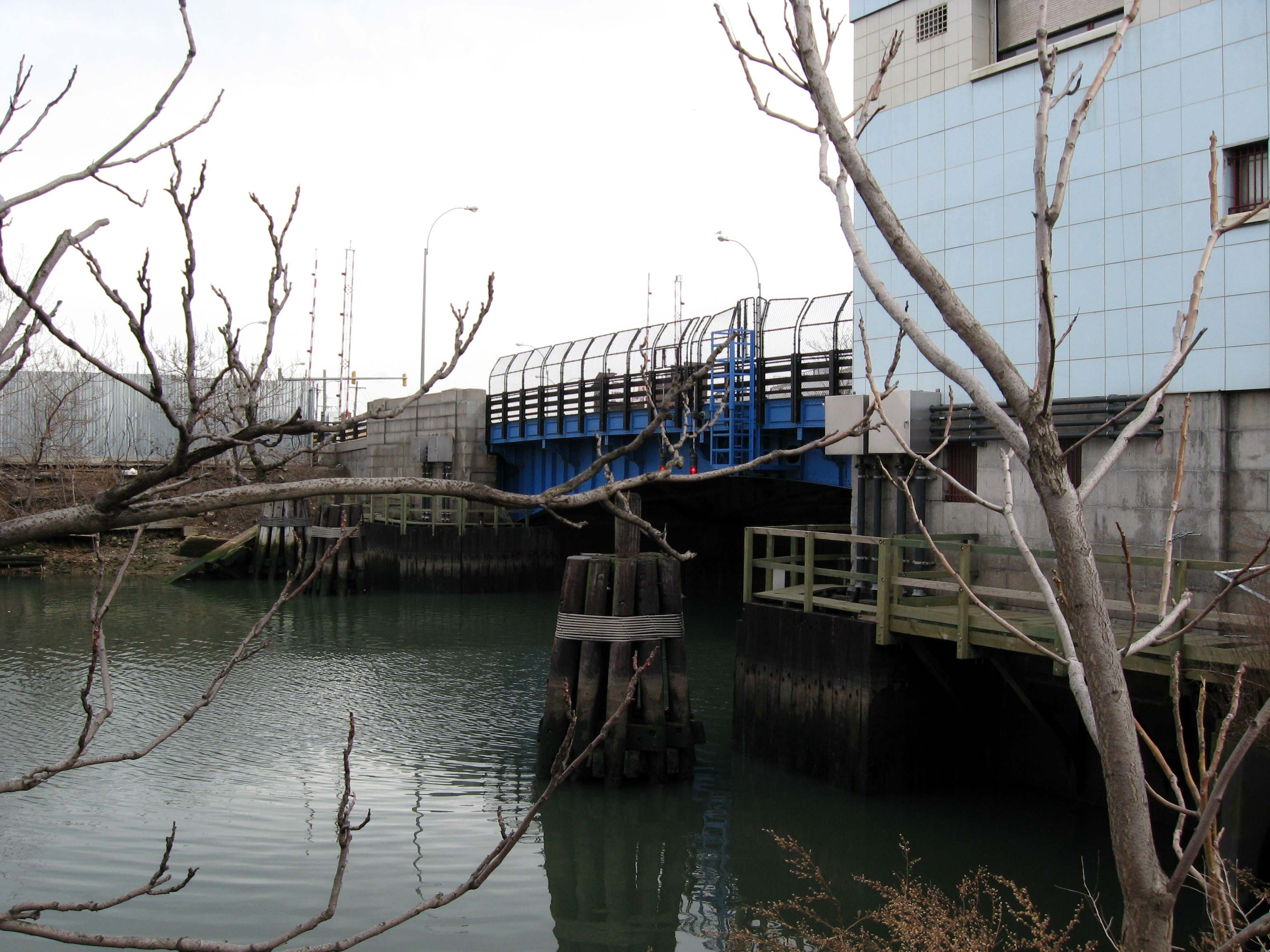
The Metropolitan Avenue Bridge connects Grand Street, Grand Avenue, and Metropolitan Avenue

Grand Street, Grand Avenue, and Broadway (Queens) are served by the following bus routes:

- The Q59 serves the entire “Grand” corridor east of Kent Avenue (Rego Park), or Wythe Avenue (Williamsburg). It is absent between Roebling Street and Union Avenue. Eastbound buses are also absent from Metropolitan to Gardner Avenues and from 64th Street to Flushing Avenue.
- The Q54 runs on Grand Street between Metropolitan Avenue and either Rodney Street (Jamaica), or Marcy Avenue (Williamsburg), via Borinquen Place.
- The Q58 and Q98 run on Grand Avenue east of Flushing Avenue. The former continues straight onto Broadway until Corona Avenue while the latter diverts east onto Queens Boulevard.
- The Maspeth-bound B57 runs from 61st to 64th Streets.
- The Q39 runs on Grand Avenue between Rust Street and either 58th Avenue (Glendale), or 61st Street (Queens Plaza).
- The Q18 runs on two portions. One is on Broadway between 58th Street and either 54th Street (Astoria), or 51st Street (Maspeth). The other portion is on Grand Avenue from Borden Avenue to 69th Street, Maspeth-bound only.
- On Broadway:
  - The Q53 SBS runs south of Roosevelt Avenue.
  - The Q70 SBS runs between the Brooklyn-Queens Expressway and either the Victor A. Moore Bus Terminal (LaGuardia Airport) or Roosevelt Avenue (Woodside).
  - The Q104 runs from 11th to 48th Streets (Sunnyside), and from Newtown Road to Vernon Boulevard (Astoria).
  - East Elmhurst-bound Q47 buses run from 75th Street to 74th Street.

The following subway stations serve the corridor:

- The Grand Street (L train) subway station serves the corner of Grand Street and Bushwick Avenue.
- The Grand Avenue – Newtown (E, F, M, and R trains) subway station is located at Grand Avenue and Queens Boulevard.
- The IND Queens Boulevard Line continues from the Grand Avenue-Newtown station up Broadway until the Steinway Street station.
- The Broadway (N and W trains) subway station is located at Broadway and 31st Street.

=== Grand Street Bridge ===
Grand Street and Grand Avenue are connected via a swing bridge over Newtown Creek. Construction began in August 1900 and was planned to be completed in October 1901, but the bridge did not open until December 1902. A report later found the delay was caused by incompetency from the contracted engineer, which eventually led to engineers from the New York City Department of Bridges commandeering the project. The current bridge is the third on the site. The first two were built in 1875 and 1890.

== History ==
When Williamsburg was an independent town (and, later, city), Grand Street was its first main east-west commercial street which acted as a dividing line between the Northside of town and the Southside of town. Street numbering originated here with North 1st Street, North 2nd Street (now Metropolitan Avenue) and so on running parallel to Grand to the north and South 1st Street, South 2nd Street and so on progressing to the south. Its initial segments from the East River were first named Washington Street and then Dunham Street. It was extended to the southeast to Roebling Street in 1812 and to the then village line between Rodney and Keap Streets in 1830. Soon after, the street was extended to Union Avenue in the new third ward of Williamsburg and bent on an angle to the east in order to pass through the property of several prominent land owners. Grand Street was opened from Bushwick Avenue to Metropolitan Avenue in 1858.

In the 19th century, before the construction of the Williamsburg Bridge, the Grand Street Ferry connected Grand Street, Brooklyn to Grand Street, Manhattan. The Grand Street Line was a streetcar line along the road. Two Long Island Rail Road stations existed along the street in both boroughs. Grand Street (LIRR Evergreen station) along the Evergreen Branch near Willamsburg from 1868 to 1885, and Grand Street (LIRR Main Line station), a station in Elmhurst along Main Line that also served the Rockaway Beach Branch from 1913 to 1925.

At some point between the construction of the Williamsburg Bridge and 1913 (it appears on a 1913 map of Brooklyn), Grand Street was connected to the bridge plaza from the elbow bend near Union Avenue by the Grand Street Extension (now named Borinquen Place) and this became the main flow for car traffic. In 1950, Grand Street was severed by the Brooklyn–Queens Expressway (BQE) between Marcy Avenue and Rodney Street.

== In popular culture ==
The street is referenced in songs and books from many local artists, including Tom Waits and Kathleen Brennan ("I Don't Wanna Grow Up", popularized by the Ramones) and Matt & Kim (the title of their album Grand, as well as in the lyrics of their songs "Cameras" and "Daylight").
