= Binkie =

Binkie may refer to

- Binkie Beaumont (1908–1973), British theatre manager and producer
- Binkie Stuart, Scottish child actress born as Elizabeth Alison Fraser (1932–2001)
- Binkie Huckaback, a character in the BBC Radio programme Round the Horne
- Binkie Muddlefoot, a character from the Disney Animated series Darkwing Duck

== See also ==
- Binky (disambiguation)
- Binki, stage name of American singer and songwriter Baraka Andrew Ongeri (born 1997)
