= Sidewalks (album) =

Studio album by Matt & Kim
- Released: November 2, 2010
- Genres: Dance-punk; synth-pop
- Length: 34:56
- Label: Fader Label
- Producers: Ben H. Allen; Oliver Straus

Matt & Kim chronology
Grand (2009)	Sidewalks (2010)	Lightning (2012)

Singles from Sidewalks
- 1. "Cameras" Released: August 31, 2010; 2. "Block After Block" Released: October 28, 2010

Sidewalks is the third studio album by American duo Matt & Kim, consisting of keyboardist and vocalist Matt Johnson and drummer Kim Schifino. It follows their previous studio album Grand (2009), which the usage of its songs in commercials and TV series and the music video for "Lessons Learned" gained the duo popularity. Sidewalks continues Matt & Kim's basic and high-energy dance-punk synthpop style, but with a higher-fidelity sound courtesy of being recorded in professional studios instead of being self-recorded as was the case with their prior albums. Sidewalks was produced by Ben H. Allen and Oliver Straus.

Sidewalks was released on November 2, 2010, on Fader Label, and was promoted with single releases and music videos for "Cameras" and "Block After Block", directed by Jonathan Del Gatto. The received mixed reviews from music critics, the duo's upbeat tone was once again noted although was heavily criticized for the studio-quality production diluting the band's signature harsh punk personality. It reached number 30 on the Billboard 200 chart and the top ten of Billboard's Independent Albums, Top Rock Albums and Alternative Albums chart.

== Background ==
Matt & Kim, a duo consisting of keyboardist and vocalist Matt Johnson and drummer Kim Schifino, began their discography with the 2005 extended play To/From and released their debut self-titled studio album in 2006. However, the band gained popularity following usage of songs from their second studio album Grand (2009) on series such as Community and Entourage and commercials. Further boosting themselves to public exposure was a video for "Lessons Learned". It garnered accolades at the MTV Video Music Awards and mtvU Woodie Awards of 2009, and was the inspiration for Erykah Badu's video for "Window Seat".

== Production and compositions ==
For Matt & Kim's next album, Sidewalks, the duo spent 13 hours a day and six days a week recording. The duo wanted to focus more on the composition and performance than how it was recorded; thus, they recorded in professional studios and hired Gnarls Barkley and Animal Collective collaborator Ben H. Allen as producer, a different method from their past releases where they would self-record at their homes. Additionally, the two wanted more anthemic material instead of typical songs, as well as incorporate more hip-hop influences that were only on two Grand songs: "Good Ol' Fashioned Nightmare" and "Daylight". "Block After Block" and "Cameras", in particular, employ percussion typical of Southern hip-hop. The only tracks absent of Sidewalks' stylistic expansion and recording finesse are "Wires" and "Silver Tiles".

The duo's emotional maturity in the lyrics is also displayed on Sidewalks. Certain songs, such as "Block After Block" and "Ice Melts", combine the group's animated upbeat aspects with melancholy, resulting in bittersweet tracks. "Northeast" is a somber piano ballad about nostalgia for their childhood, containing lyrical references to "Daylight". "Where You're Coming From" depicts the subject on the brink of giving up willing to try again, as Johnson sings, "I'm on my feet today, and I'm walking to the grave. I drew this map by hand to show you how to be a man."

Aside from the professional method of recording resulting in a more high-fidelity sound, Sidewalks is consistent with Matt & Kim's previous albums in many aspects, mainly its dance-punk style. The compositions are simple and revolve around major key chord progressions, and are performed in arrangements driven by bombastic drums, synthesizers, and nasal vocal performances. The lyrics also retain the quirkiness, optimism, and references to being in New York of the duo's previous works.

== Release and promotion ==
Naming the album was a tough part of the process. Matt & Kim's initial plan was Deluxe, but the label found it the "worst possible, most confusing name", reasoning consumers would confuse it as a deluxe edition of their self-titled first LP. It was not until a drive through Brooklyn just after the album's completion that the name Sidewalks was conceived on the spot. From June 17 to November 6, 2010, Matt and Kim went on tour to support their upcoming third album. None on the LP was performed live by the group; it was played on the public address system of the venue before each show began, and the duo's setlist was all of Grand. On August 30, 2010, the name of their next album was announced, and its lead single "Cameras" premiered on 1077theend.com before being released officially the next day. On October 28, 2010, "Block After Block" was released as the second and final single. "AM/FM Sound" was available for streaming on Entertainment Weekly's website on November 1, 2010, before the album was issued the next day by Fader Label.

The Sidewalks music videos had been planned since August 2010. The music video for "Cameras" was released on January 20, 2011, and depicts Schifino and Johnson bloodily fighting each other with equipment. The two excessively stunt-trained, and there were many on-set injuries during shooting according to the group's spokesperson. A video for "Block After Block" was released on June 16, 2011, and involve the duo flash performing in various parts of New York City, such as Rockefeller Plaza, a Home Depot, the subway, and Chinatown. Both videos were directed by Jonathan Del Gatto. Promotion of Sidewalks was supposed to finish with a video for "Good For Great", which was announced by Johnson at a press conference. However, it was never released.

== Reception ==
Professional ratings
Aggregate scores
Source	Rating
Metacritic	62/100
Review scores
Source	Rating
AllMusic	2.5/5 stars
The A.V. Club	C+
Consequence of Sound	3.5/5 stars
Entertainment Weekly	B
NME	2/5 stars
Pitchfork	6.3/10
PopMatters	6/10 stars
Rolling Stone	3/5 stars
Slant Magazine	3/5 stars
Spin	8/10

Sidewalks holds an aggregate score of 62/100 on Metacritic based on 19 reviews, indicating "generally favorable reviews". As with previous releases, the center of debate was on Matt & Kim's upbeat tone, which critics analogized as being extremely sugary. musicOMH's Max Raymond felt that "there is a certain amount of charm and vibrancy that keeps one coming back for more" despite its hit-and-miss quality. Luke O'Neil of The Boston Globe and Chris Coplan of No Ripcord praised Sidewalks as a "street-savvy" and "likable" presentation of the confusion of youth. The album was also called "therapy you can spaz out to" by J. Edward Keyes of Rolling Stone, who considered its "pervasive optimism" its greatest feature. On the other hand, NME's Ben Hewitt was turned off by its "vomit-inducing" and "sickly" sound, "chart-pap melodies", and "sodden clichés", and joked Johnson's vocals "wavers unconvincingly like an exasperated Dad failing to assert their authority".

The professional production garnered a mixed response. Detractors felt it watered down the duo's characteristic amateur punk hardiness and rebellion, most displayed in their live performances, in favor of a pop sound. An example of this was the decreased presence of Schifion's drums in favor of electronic percussion. As Christian Williams of The A.V. Club argued, "the album pinballs off the spiffy new production elements without ever racking up high scores, as track after track ends on feel-good shout-alongs that never really inspire shouting along." Pitchfork's Rebecca Raber concluded it made way for "repetitive, rhythmic chords that almost sound like samples and drums that sound mechanical (instead of manic)" and magnified the group's worst aspects, such as its monotonous lyrics, vocal performance and "crude" synthesizer lines.

However, some reviewers felt the hi-fi production improved Matt & Kim's sound and that their perceived frantic punk persona was still prevalent enough to be enjoyable. Consequence of Sound's E.N. May, for example, highlighted the album's "versatility" and the act's ability to "become a popular band without alienating their base", concluding, "The two keep it earnest for the sake of taking the next step forward, and now with this album they have the strong potential to move up the proverbial mainstream ladder." Chris Martins of Spin felt its larger sound and increased emphasis on choruses better reflected the "in-person oomph" of their live performances, and that its "best tracks trade Kim's punk drumming for handclaps, sleigh bells, and bassy kicks". PopMatters reviewer Dylan Nelson argued that although the decreased emphasis on the duo's personality meant their "musicianship avails itself to starker scrutiny", the new sound also meant the duo "are coming into their own, adding levels of sophistication to their infectious pop sensibility".

== Track listing ==
All tracks are written by Matt Johnson and Kim Schifino and produced by Ben H. Allen and Oliver Straus.

Sidewalks
No.	Title	Length
1.	"Block After Block"	2:56
2.	"AM/FM Sound"	3:15
3.	"Cameras"	3:33
4.	"Red Paint"	3:07
5.	"Where You're Coming From"	4:09
6.	"Good for Great"	3:50
7.	"Northeast"	2:53
8.	"Wires"	3:59
9.	"Silver Tiles"	3:38
10.	"Ice Melts"	3:46
Total length:		34:56

== Personnel ==
Credits from the liner notes and Billboard.

- Matt & Kim – artwork, songwriter
- Ben H. Allen – mixing, producer
- Rob Gardner – engineer
- Oliver Straus – engineer, mixing, producer
- Andy Marcinkowski – editing
- Joe LaPorta – mastering
- Dave McNair – mastering
- Sam Friedman – logo
- Kalani Fujimori – design

== Charts ==
Weekly chart performance for Sidewalks
Chart (2010)	Peak position
US Billboard 200	30
US Independent Albums (Billboard)	5
US Top Alternative Albums (Billboard)	5
US Top Rock Albums (Billboard)	6
