= Binky =

Binky may refer to:

== Fictional characters ==
- Binky (Life in Hell), the main character of the Life in Hell comic strip series by Matt Groening
- Binky (Discworld), Death's horse in the Discworld book series
- Binky Biggs, the title character of the DC Comics series Leave It to Binky
- Binky the Clown, a minor character in the comic strip Garfield
- Binky Barnes, an anthropomorphic bulldog in Arthur, a children's book and animated television series

== People ==
- Binky Favis, Filipino basketball coach in the 1990s and 2000s
- Alexandra "Binky" Felstead, in the British structured-reality television series Made in Chelsea
- Binky Jones (1899–1961), American baseball player
- Binky Mack, an American rapper from the group Allfrumtha I
- Binky April Tupas (born 1979), Filipino politician

== Other uses ==
- Binky (polar bear), a bear formerly in an Alaskan zoo
- Pacifier

== See also ==
- Binkie (disambiguation)
- Binki, stage name of American singer and songwriter Baraka Andrew Ongeri (born 1997)
