= Almost Everyday =

Studio album by Matt and Kim
- Released: May 4, 2018
- Recorded: 2017
- Genres: Pop; indie pop; indie electronic; alternative dance; electropop
- Length: 28:01
- Label: Fader Label

Matt and Kim chronology
We Were The Weirdos (2016)	Almost Everyday (2018)	Be Kind Rewind (2021)

Singles from Almost Everyday
- 1. "Forever" Released: January 12, 2018; 2. "Like I Used to Be" Released: February 23, 2018; 3. "Happy if You're Happy" Released: March 23, 2018; 4. "Glad I Tried" Released: April 13, 2018

Professional ratings
Review scores
Source	Rating
AllMusic	3.5/5 stars

Almost Everyday is the sixth studio album by American indie electronic duo Matt and Kim. It was released on May 4, 2018, through Fader Label.

== Background ==
In 2017, Kim suffered an ACL injury. The band cancelled the rest of their tour and took time off to focus on her recovery. In December 2017, the band revealed that during Kim's recovery, they wrote and recorded an album that was said to be their most personal album yet. They released four singles, "Forever", "Like I Used to Be", "Happy if You're Happy", and "Glad I Tried" and announced a spring tour to promote the album. They later announced that the album would be called Almost Everyday and revealed the album art and tracklist. The album features backing vocals from Mark Hoppus of blink-182, SWMRS, Flosstradamus, Santigold, Kevin Morby, Kevin Ray of Walk the Moon, Dave Monks of Tokyo Police Club, King Tuff, Clairo, Travis Hawley of Night Riots, HXLT, Van William of Waters, and Matt's brother, Fletcher C. Johnson.

== Tour ==
A tour to support the album kicked off on March 23, 2018.

== Singles ==
The first single, "Forever", was released on January 12, 2018, with a music video. "Like I Used to Be" was released as the second single on February 23, 2018, alongside a lyric video, and the revealing of the album's title, cover art, and tracklist. "Happy if You're Happy" was released as the third single on March 23, 2018, with a music video. The album went up for pre-order the same day. The fourth single, "Glad I Tried" was released on April 13, 2018.

== Track listing ==
Almost Everyday
No.	Title	Length
1.	"Intro"	1:12
2.	"Forever"	3:14
3.	"Like I Used to Be"	3:55
4.	"I'd Rather"	2:52
5.	"Happy if You're Happy"	1:49
6.	"On My Own"	3:10
7.	"All in My Head"	2:19
8.	"Youngest I Will Be"	2:40
9.	"Glad I Tried"	2:54
10.	"Where Do We Go From Here?"	3:56
Total length:		28:01

== Charts ==
Weekly chart performance for Almost Everyday
Chart (2018)	Peak position
US Top Album Sales (Billboard)	70
US Independent Albums (Billboard)	18
