= Lightning (Matt and Kim album) =

Studio album by Matt & Kim
- Released: October 2, 2012
- Recorded: January 1–July 2012 (Brooklyn, New York)
- Genres: Indie pop, electronic
- Length: 31:18
- Labels: Fader Label, Universal
- Producers: Matt & Kim

Matt & Kim chronology
Sidewalks (2010)	Lightning (2012)	New Glow (2015)

Singles from Lightning
- 1. "Let's Go" Released: June 25, 2012; 2. "Now" Released: September 4, 2012; 3. "It's Alright" Released: February 25, 2013

Lightning is the fourth studio album from the indie pop duo Matt & Kim, written, produced, performed and recorded by them in their New York apartment between January and July 2012, using Logic Pro. The ten-track set is an electronic indie pop album which member Matt Johnson described as being upbeat, while on some tracks being a little darker. The group decided "to do as little possible to the songs production-wise and still have them be strong" unlike their previous studio project Sidewalks.

Lightning was released on October 2, 2012, and was promoted with an autumn tour, a giveaway, and a 2013 remix album. Although Lightning sold well enough to reach number 50 on the Billboard 200 among a few other US Billboard charts, it was met with a varied critical reception, holding an aggregate score of 59 out of 100 from Metacritic as of March 2014. Some reviewers criticized the lack of introduction of any new type of music, unlike Sidewalks, while other's thought the album was an improvement from the previous album.

== Production ==
Work on Lightning was done between January 1 and July 2012, in Matt and Kim's old apartment on Grand Street in Brooklyn, New York. The album was written and recorded using the music production software Logic Pro. The 10 tracks of Lightning were pared from 25 to 26 songs originally written for the album, which Matt Johnson said that "it gave us [Matt and Kim] a lot more to choose from, which let Kim and I really broaden this album out." He said in an interview that the group "felt there was a lot going on in the songs" on their album Sidewalks. "In a way, the safest thing you can do with a song is to make it have a lot of stuff. The more you put on, the less the actual songwriting is exposed. For the new album [Lightning], I was excited to do as little possible to the songs production-wise and still have them be strong." He also said that the album's recording location "was a nice farewell" to the apartment.

Matt's vocals were recorded using a Brent Averill 1073, JDK R24 EQ, and a Shure SMB7 microphone. Vocal tracks were compressed three or four times, and filtering techniques with blankets and a sE Electronics Reflexion filter were used to cut out background noises of the Brooklyn–Queens Expressway. The drums were recorded at the studio Rubber Tracks, with Aaron Bastinelli engineering, while the synths were performed and programmed through a MIDI keyboard in Logic. Other assistance in making Lightning included Lar Stalfors mixing "Tonight". The tracks were summed using a Dangerous Music D-Box.

== Composition ==
Matt describe the songs from the album as "slightly…. Umm, I'm not going to say they're dark, but while everything has maintained an upbeat quality, there are some tracks that are a little darker that are related to just… I don't know it's weird. People tend to say, “The more success you have, the easier things will be,” and that's not always the case. Sometimes it's more like, “The more success you have the harder things become.”"

"Let's Go" includes instrumentation of piano chords, synth bass, synth strings, and a hip-hop drum beat. The song's chorus is Matt shouting “Let's go let's go let's go let's go!” AllMusic said that the song "cuts the tempo in favor of an almost funky late-'90s groove." "Now" was described by PopMatters as a combination of "a style of music outside of the duo's usual comfort zone [ Dubstep ]" with the group's usual musical style. "It's Alright" includes percussion of a kick drum and tambourine, and was considered by Consequence of Sound as a dance-jazz song. Matt said it was one of his favorite songs. "Not That Bad" has instrumentation of martial drums, piano plinks, and a synth brass section. According to PopMatters, when the "synth brass section comes in and the tempo slows down for the chorus, it feels like something big is coming." "Overexposed" is instrumentated with a quick-moving wobbly right-hand synth, keyboard, bass guitar, kickdrum and hi-hat. The song's Pre-Chorus is “Like a picture / I was overexposed / Be-lieve me / I saw you with my eyes closed,” and the vocals during the chorus are in unison with the keyboard.

"I Said" includes elements of EDM, and a fuzzy bass that "dominate the song even more than his [Matt's] repetitive chorus of “I said I said I said it's real / I said I said I said take the wheel / But you said you said you said no deal.”" The song was described by Allmusic as a "rubbery midtempo ballad that injects a smidgen of melancholy into the proceedings." "Tonight" has an instrumentation of a disco bass, and the drumbeat and bass of the song "makes the song the most authentically danceable on the album," according to Popmatters. "I Wonder" has a "chopped and screwed beat and dancing piano lines" that "is club pop for the PBR set," according to Paste Magazine. Lyrically, the song deals with getting older and "staying put". "Much Too Late" is "a rant that seems to come out of nowhere and doesn't fit in with anything else on this record," as described by PopMatters. "Ten Dollars I Found" is the last track of the album, and was described by Popmatters as the only real ballad from the album.

== Release and promotion ==
To promote the album, a tour ran from October 3 until November 17, 2012. Matt and Kim also began giving away signed full length vinyl copies of their self-titled debut album, signed copies of Lightning, T-shirts, signed rare 7″ records, signed handwritten lyrics, and two tickets for a concert of the Lightning Tour. A remix album was released on October 1, 2013, and was first announced on August 27.

== In popular culture ==
Since at least 2017, "It's Alright" has appeared on TV ads for Buick in the United States.

== Critical reception ==
Professional ratings
Aggregate scores
Source	Rating
Metacritic	59/100
Review scores
Source	Rating
AllMusic	3.5/5 stars
Alternative Press	2/5 stars
The A.V. Club	C
Consequence of Sound	3/5 stars
Entertainment Weekly	B+
Paste	7/10
Pitchfork	5.1/10
PopMatters	6/10
Punknews.org	3.5/5 stars
Rolling Stone	2.5/5 stars

Lightning was met with mixed reviews from music critics. Metacritic reports a "mixed to average" aggregate score of 59 out of 100 based on 13 critical reviews. Some reviews felt the album didn't introduce any new type of music from the group, unlike the group's previous album Sidewalks, while other reviews thought the album was an improvement from Sidewalks.

Pitchfork wrote that "the sound of maximalist Top 40 pop, and apply a low-budget, DIY aesthetic to it," was "barely expounded upon on Lightning," and called it, "In the context of Matt & Kim's discography," "inconsequential. Like an echo of an echo, there's nothing here that Matt & Kim haven't already done over and over again." The A.V. Club said that, "In getting back to basics... the record leaves out the memorable hooks that make the whole formula work." Exclaim! called the album a step-up from Sidewalks, but was "bogged down by the redundancy of Johnson's elementary songwriting," and Under the Radar found it "annoyingly upbeat." The Alternative Press was more negative on the album, writing that most of the songs "beg for remixes, guest vocalists or anything to give them more depth."

On the more positive side, Entertainment Weekly gave Lightning a B+ grade, saying that "Songs with shotglass-half-full titles like "It's Alright" and "Not That Bad" build to fist-pump choruses, but there's just enough attitude to counter that rah-rah spirit." Paste Magazine said the album, "after a few listens, is actually pretty good if you forgive the total banality of its content. Which, by the way, is a good way to describe the album as a whole." Both Consequence of Sound and PopMatters had opinions that the group's sound of their future albums could improve from Lightning. AllMusic said that the record was "no kind of departure, but the slight variations in sound and the slightly expanded emotional palette mean that it's an improvement over the last record [Sidewalks] or two [Sidewalks and Grand]." Magnet Magazine said the album had the "tried-and-true formula that has worked so well for them." Punknews.org found to album to be "pop pleasure, with nothing to feel guilty about."

In 2012, Complex listed the album #43 on their "50 most anticipated albums for the rest of 2012," writing that "Matt Johnson and Kim Schifino won't be running around Times Square in the nude this time, but the indie pop act is still set to impress."

== Track listing ==
No.	Title	Length
1.	"Let's Go"	3:30
2.	"Now"	4:05
3.	"It's Alright"	3:23
4.	"Not That Bad"	3:17
5.	"Overexposed"	2:46
6.	"I Said"	4:14
7.	"Tonight"	3:06
8.	"I Wonder"	2:50
9.	"Much Too Late"	2:12
10.	"Ten Dollars I Found"	1:55

== Chart positions ==
Chart (2012)	Peak position
US Billboard 200	50
US Independent Albums (Billboard)	10
US Top Rock Albums (Billboard)	21
