= Grand (Matt and Kim album) =

Studio album by Matt & Kim
- Released: January 20, 2009
- Genres: Dance-punk, indie rock, indie pop, lo-fi
- Length: 29:19
- Label: Fader Label Universal

Matt & Kim chronology
Matt & Kim (2006)	Grand (2009)	Sidewalks (2010)

Grand is the second album release from the band Matt & Kim, recorded entirely in the Vermont home where Matt grew up. It was released on January 20, 2009, on Fader. The album was named after Grand Street where the duo live.

== Track listing ==
No.	Title	Length
1.	"Daylight"	2:50
2.	"Cutdown"	2:52
3.	"Good Ol' Fashion Nightmare"	3:30
4.	"Spare Change"	1:14
5.	"I Wanna"	1:37
6.	"Lessons Learned"	3:36
7.	"Don't Slow Down"	3:08
8.	"Turn This Boat Around"	2:10
9.	"Cinders"	1:47
10.	"I'll Take Us Home"	3:28
11.	"Daylight Outro Remix"	3:10

== Critical reception ==
Professional ratings
Aggregate scores
Source	Rating
Metacritic	70/100
Review scores
Source	Rating
AllMusic	3/5 stars
The A.V. Club	B
Clash	7/10
Consequence of Sound	D
NME	7/10
Paste	7/10
Pitchfork	7.3/10
PopMatters	7/10
Rolling Stone	2.5/5 stars
Spin	7/10

Kevin O'Donnell of Rolling Stone remarked on the lo-fi, frantic recording style of the duo and called the results sometimes "exhilarating", then asked "What's missing?" He answers: "Killer melodies to give some weight to their arty moves." Billboard said that "even though Grand is a bit toned down from Matt & Kim's first albums, it maintains the spunk, high energy and carefree attitude that caught people's attention in the first place."

== Music videos ==
A music video was made for the songs "Lessons Learned" and "Daylight". In the video for "Lessons Learned", Matt and Kim are seen getting out of a van in Times Square. They start to walk down the sidewalk, gradually taking off their clothes, until they are both naked. They then stand in the sidewalk looking at the skyscrapers while pedestrians look on in surprise. They are then attacked by the police, but they run off and escape. Right after "escaping", Kim is hit by a bus that she did not see coming.

"Lessons Learned" won the award for Breakthrough Video at the 2009 MTV Video Music Awards.
