= Birdmonster =

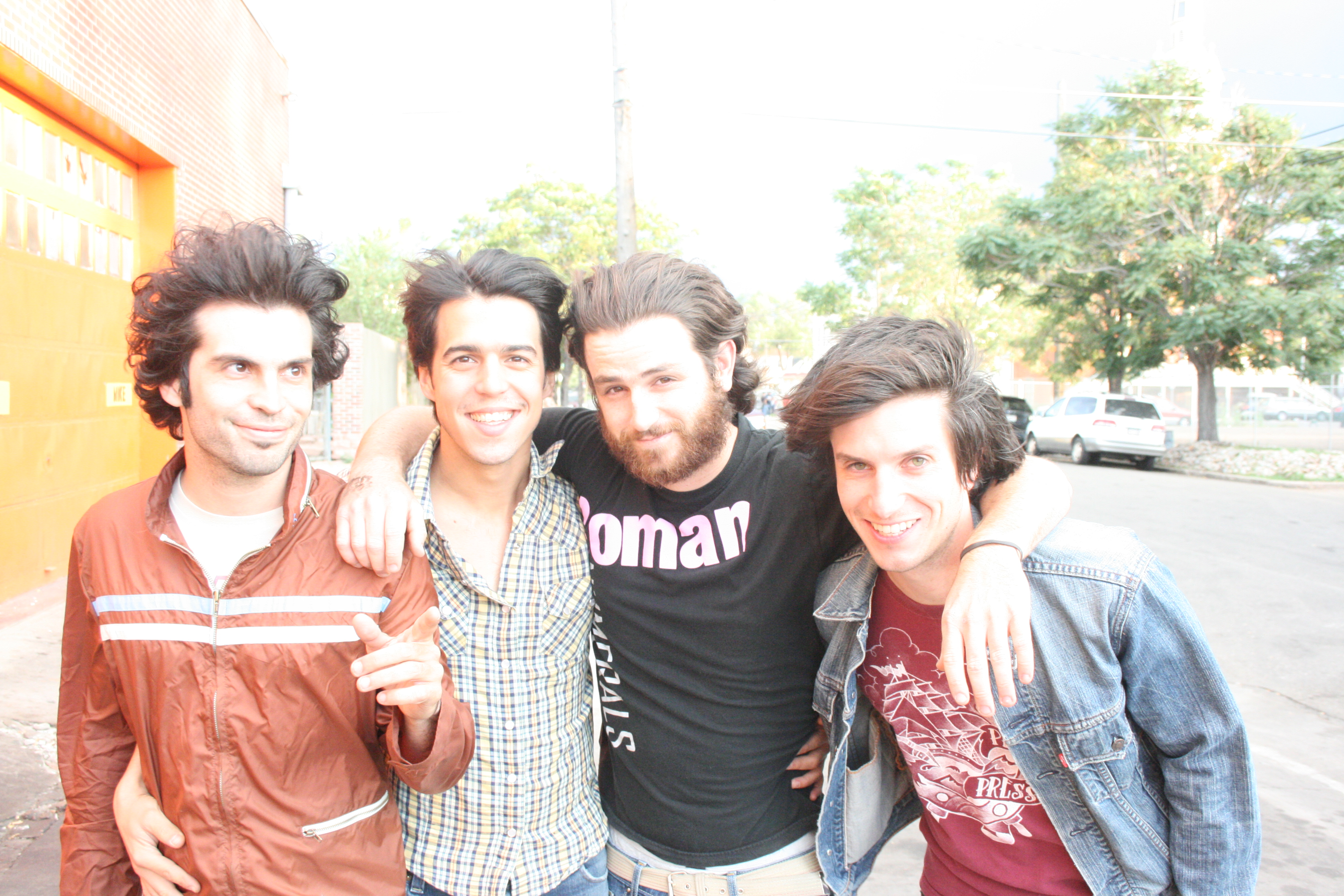
- Birdmonster.

Background information
- Origin: San Francisco, California
- Genres: Rock; Indie rock
- Years active: 2004-present
- Labels: SpinART, Fader Label
- Members: Peter Arcuni; Justin Tenuto; David Klein; Zach Winter
- Website: Official Site

Birdmonster is an American rock band based in San Francisco, California.

== History ==
=== Early years ===
Peter Arcuni, a native of Connecticut and former editorial assistant at Wired, formed Birdmonster in 2004 with three other local San Francisco musicians: childhood friends bassist Justin Tenuto and guitarist David Klein, and drummer Zach Winter.

The band began by playing live shows, initially booking performances by offering to fill in opening act slots. They also courted Internet radio stations, like San Francisco's BagelRadio.com, whose owner convinced a booker to give the band its first high-visibility show, opening for Clap Your Hands Say Yeah.

=== EP and No Midnight ===
The band released their self-titled EP in December 2004 and used proceeds from its sales to tour the United States. In the summer of 2005, David Klein paid $500 to include "Resurrection Song" on a Magnet magazine sampler, which attracted music industry attention. The band received several offers for recording contracts and distribution, but turned them all down. Arcuni explained that "the numbers (risk vs. reward) didn't add up."

The band decided to self-release their debut album, No Midnight, hiring producer Bradley Cook, who had previously worked with Foo Fighters and Queens of the Stone Age. The album reportedly cost $15,000 to record. It was initially distributed through CD Baby, but was later distributed through SpinART. The band toured the United States and Canada in support of the album.

=== From the Mountain to the Sea ===
In early 2008, the band began recording material for their new album at Hyde Street Studios in the Tenderloin. On August 5, 2008, the band released their follow-up album, From the Mountain to the Sea. The album was released digitally by Fader Label via iTunes and Amazon and was made available in stores on September 2, 2008. The album was produced and engineered by Tom Schick, who has also worked with Ryan Adams, Bob Dylan, Willie Nelson, Norah Jones, and Rufus Wainwright.

In late 2008, as part of the Hangin' Out on E Street series, the band recorded a cover of Bruce Springsteen's "The Promised Land".
