= Matt and Kim =

American music duo

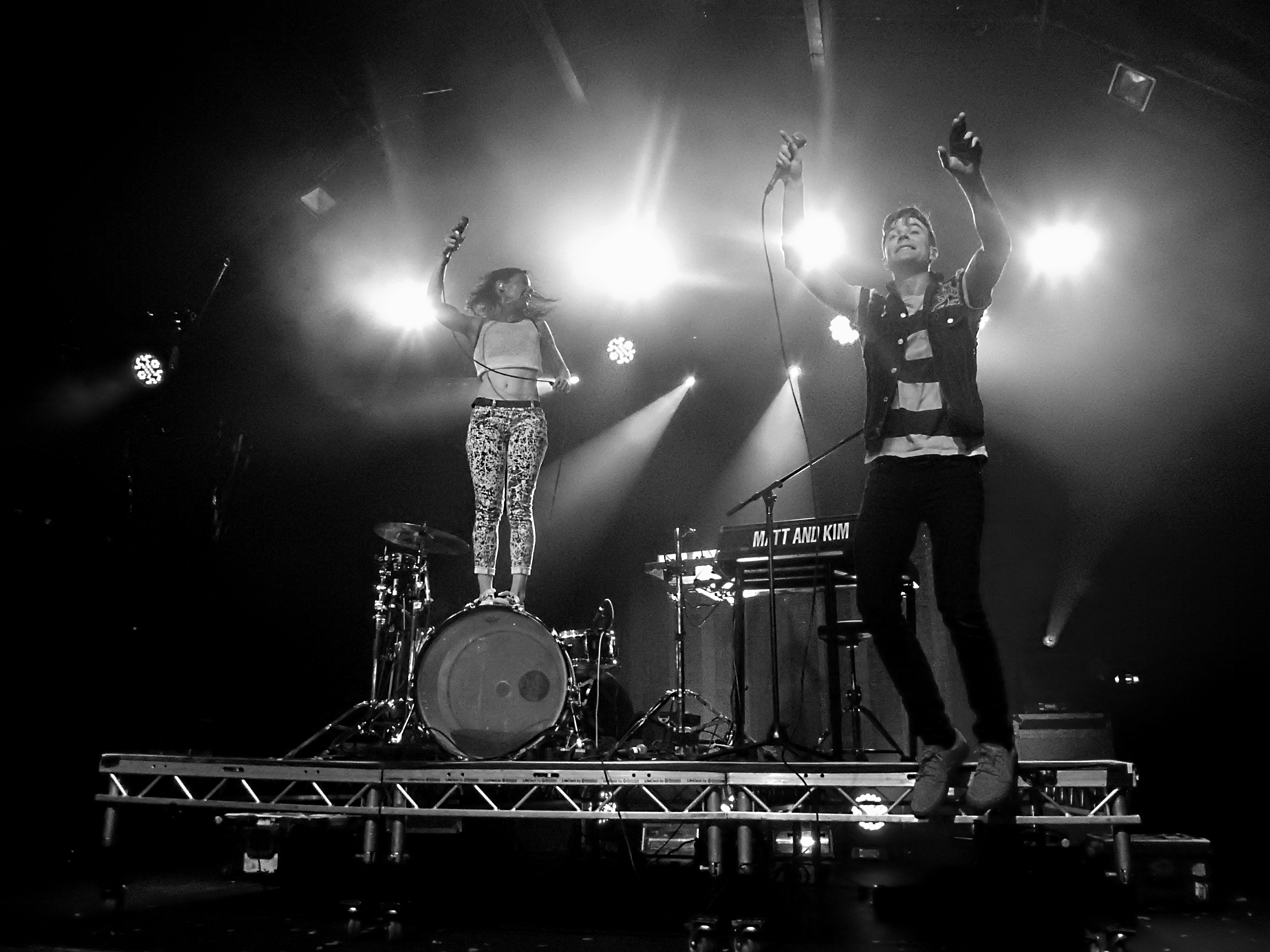
- Matt and Kim performing in London in 2015

Background information
- Origin: New York City, U.S.
- Genres: Indie pop; dance-pop; indie rock; indietronica
- Years active: 2004–present
- Labels: FADER Label; Virgin
- Members: Matt Johnson; Kim Schifino
- Website: mattandkim.com

Matt and Kim (sometimes stylized MATT and KIM) are an American indie electronic duo from Brooklyn, New York City. The group formed in 2004 and consists of Matt Johnson (vocals/keyboards) and Kim Schifino (drums). The duo is known for its upbeat dance music and energetic live shows that often incorporate samples from other artists. Although they started their career playing shows in lofts and other close-quarters venues, they have since performed at numerous festivals, including Bonnaroo, Coachella, and Firefly Music Festival.

The duo started performing together in 2004, and have released six studio albums. Their 2009 album Grand featured the lead single "Daylight", which was certified gold by the RIAA. The music video for "Lessons Learned", another song on Grand, featured the duo stripping naked in New York's Times Square and won the Breakthrough Video Award at the 2009 MTV Video Music Awards. Their fifth studio album, New Glow, was released in April 2015 by Harvest Records in the United States and Virgin EMI Records internationally. Their sixth studio album Almost Everyday was released on May 4, 2018.

== Career ==
=== 2004–2008: Early career and initial success ===
Matt Johnson is originally from Whitingham, Vermont, while Kim Schifino is originally from Providence, Rhode Island. They met while studying at Brooklyn's Pratt Institute. Schifino studied illustration and graduated in 2002, while Johnson studied film and graduated in 2004. The two began dating and moved in together after three months. After graduation, Johnson began learning to play keyboards and Schifino learned drums. Neither had extensive experience with their instruments prior to this. Despite their inexperience, they were urged to play live shows by fellow Pratt alumni from the band Japanther. Their early shows were primarily played at houses and lofts in the Brooklyn area, but they soon branched out and began touring across the nation. In 2005, they released an EP, To and From, which was their first collection of music committed to an album of any kind.

The duo's first full-length studio album, Matt & Kim, was released in October 2006 on the IHEARTCOMIX record label. The album received generally mixed to positive reviews. Adam Moerder of Pitchfork referred to the duo as the "quintessential 'party' band" in a review of their self-titled debut album. Matt and Kim also gained significant publicity for their music videos. The video for "Yea Yeah", which depicts the pair being hit with food from their refrigerator, has been considered one of the initial catalysts for their rise in popularity. They played the Lollapalooza festival in August 2007 and also played the Siren Music Festival earlier that year.

By 2008, the band had completed their second full-length album (Grand) and was looking for a record label to sign them.

=== 2009–2010: Breakthrough with Grand ===
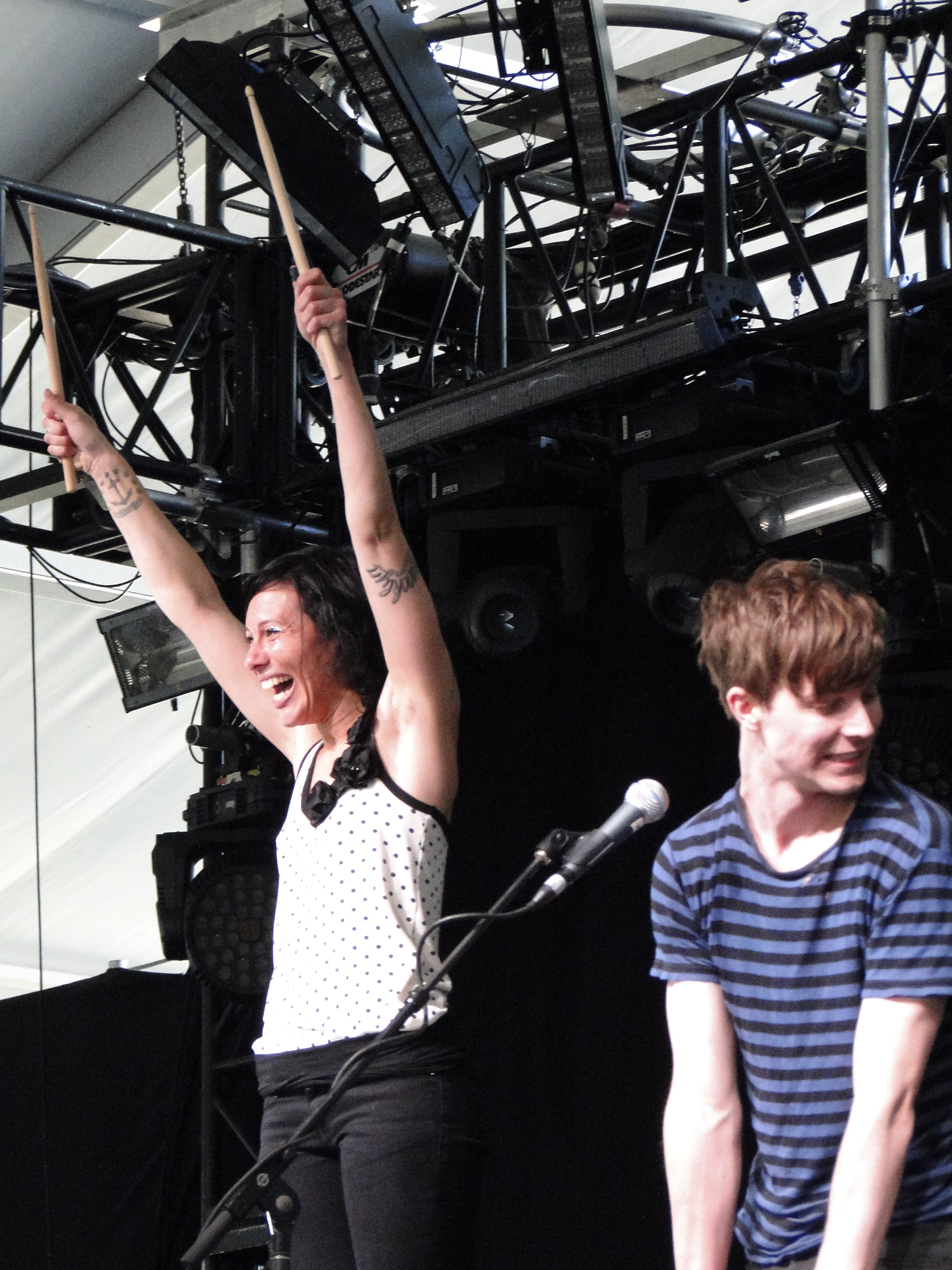
Matt and Kim performing at Coachella in 2010

Matt and Kim were signed to the Fader Label in late 2008, and Grand was released on January 20, 2009. The duo went on a three-week North American tour in November 2008 to promote the album. Grand was recorded entirely in Johnson's childhood bedroom in Vermont and Lollapalooza and is named after the street the two lived on in Brooklyn. The album took around nine months to complete. The lead single from the album, "Daylight", received certified gold status from the RIAA. The song was also featured in numerous commercials for brands including Mars Bars and Bacardi and TV shows like Community. A De La Soul remixed version of the song could be found on video games such as NBA Live 10 and FIFA 10. The duo also performed the song on an episode of Jimmy Kimmel Live!

In April 2009, the band released the controversial music video for the song "Lessons Learned". The video depicts the two completely disrobing in New York City's Times Square and is shot in a single take. The video was filmed during winter on a cold day. The video would later go on to win the Breakthrough Video Award at the 2009 MTV Video Music Awards. Also in 2009, the duo performed at the Pitchfork Music Festival and the Outside Lands Festival. They toured with punk band Against Me! in 2009 as well. The following year, they embarked on an even more ambitious touring schedule throughout North America. They played the Coachella Festival in April, the Siren Festival in July, Lollapalooza in August, and Austin City Limits in October. They also engaged in a two-month nationwide tour from September to November.

=== 2010–2011: Sidewalks and continued popularity ===
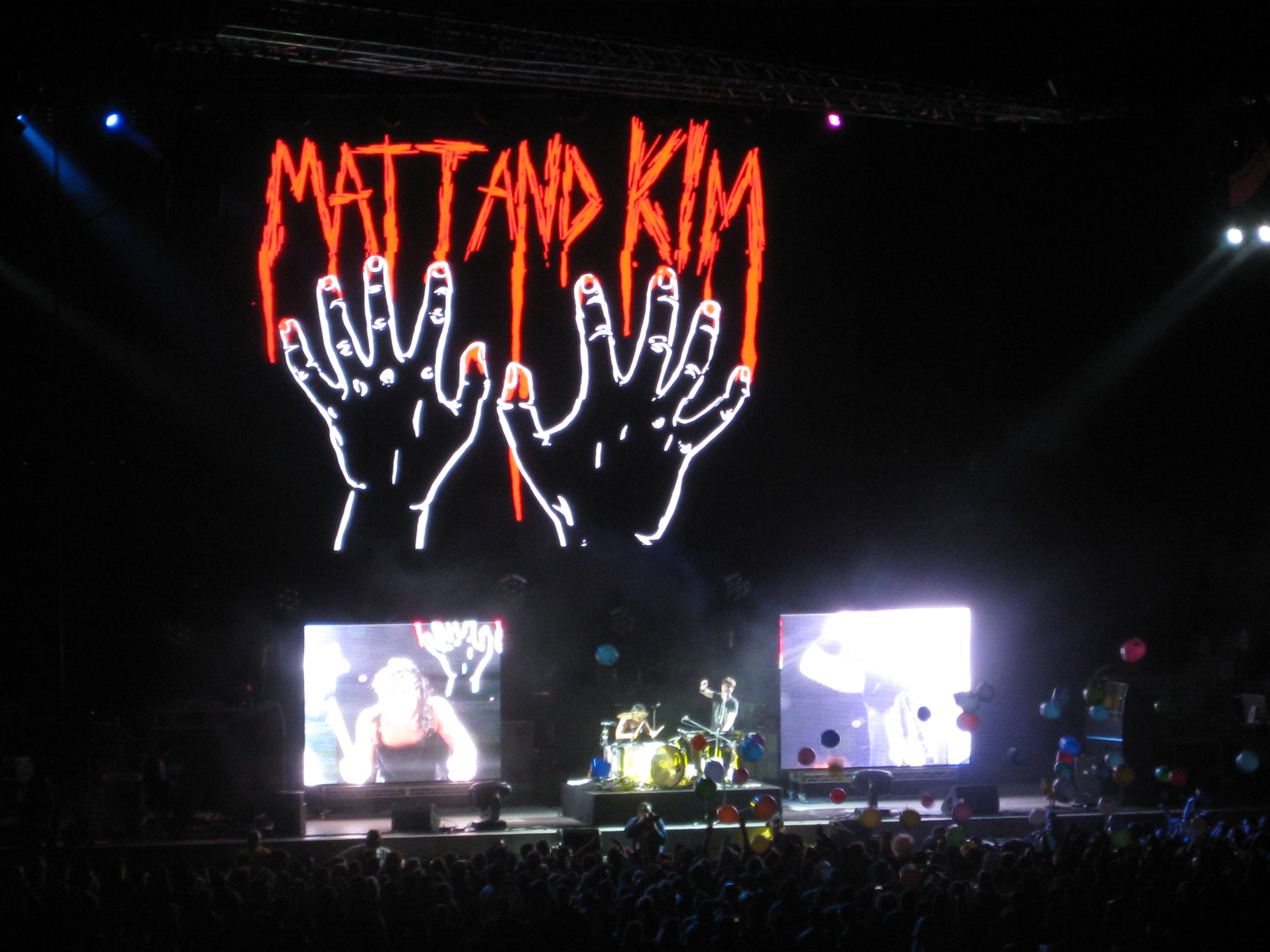
Matt and Kim performing 2011 at the Cricket Wireless Amphitheatre in Chula Vista, California

They released their third studio album, Sidewalks, in November 2010 on the Fader Label. This was the duo's first album to not be self-produced. Instead, Ben Allen, who had previously produced albums for Gnarls Barkley and Animal Collective, was one of the co-producers. Sidewalks peaked at number 30 on the Billboard 200 chart. In 2011, they continued touring heavily with shows in North America, Europe, and at the Australian festival, Big Day Out. They also supported Blink-182 and My Chemical Romance during select dates on the 2011 Honda Civic Tour.

Their music video for the song "Cameras" was released in 2011 and features Schifino and Johnson engaged in a professionally choreographed fight. When comparing the budget for the "Cameras" video against the one for "Lessons Learned", Johnson noted, "We spent 10 times as much money to make this happen." They hired choreographers who had worked on films like The Matrix and The Bourne Identity. The duo also performed "Block After Block" on a 2011 episode of Late Night with Jimmy Fallon.

=== 2012–2014: Lightning ===
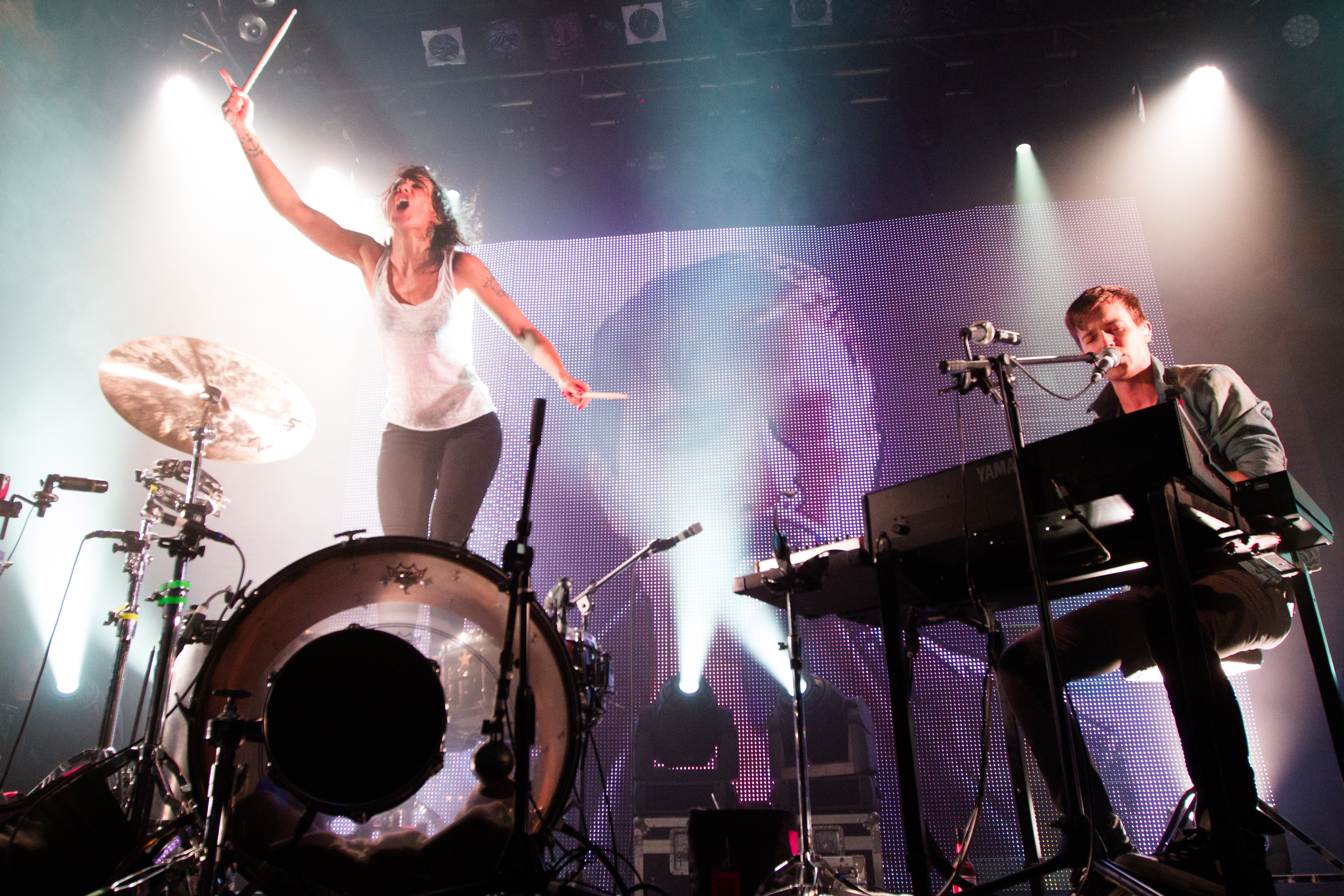
2012 performance by Matt and Kim at the House of Blues in New Orleans

The duo released their fourth studio album, Lightning, on the Fader Label in October 2012. The album took about six months to create and was self-produced in the pair's Brooklyn apartment. They chose not to enlist the services of a professional producer because they wanted the album to have a distinct, "Matt and Kim" sound. The duo embarked on a nearly two-month fall tour to promote the album in the United States. The lead single on the album, "Let's Go", was introduced in the summer of 2012 via a YouTube video of basketball player, Pat the Roc, exhibiting his dribbling skills. The real music video for the single premiered on Funny or Die shortly after the release of the album and depicts the duo in a variety of uncomfortable or awkward portraits. The band also produced a video for the single, "It's Alright", which depicts the tandem blindfolded in bed performing choreographed dance moves.

In February and March 2013, Matt and Kim toured the U.S. with Passion Pit. Over the course of the year, they played numerous festivals, including the Free Press Summer Fest, Bonnaroo Music Festival, Firefly Music Festival, and Lollapalooza in front of a large crowd. They continued touring in April 2014 at festivals like BottleRock Napa Valley, the Silopanna Music Festival, and the Hangout Music Festival. On October 10, 2014, the pair put on a sell-out show of over 60,000 attendants at the annual Fallapalooza at Creighton University.

=== 2015–2017: New Glow and WE WERE THE WEIRDOS EP ===
The duo's fifth studio album, New Glow, was released on April 7, 2015, by Harvest Records in the United States and Virgin EMI Records internationally. They premiered the lead single from the album, "Get It", with an accompanying lyric video in January 2015. In February 2015, Matt and Kim released three more singles for the album, "Hey Now", "Hoodie On", and "Can You Blame Me".

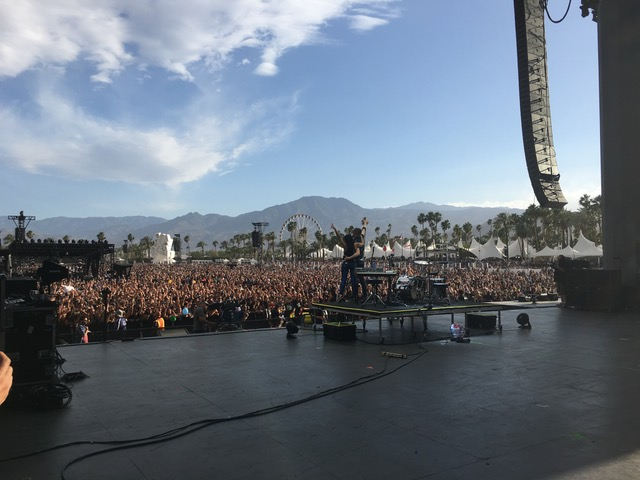
Matt and Kim performing at Coachella in 2016, the same week they recorded the EP We Were the Weirdos

The band toured extensively upon the release of New Glow, commencing with a U.S. tour in April and May 2015, then heading to London for a one-off at Heaven. More US and Canadian festivals followed throughout the summer. They returned to the UK for an arena tour supporting Fall Out Boy, including two nights at Wembley Arena and finished out the year in the US doing festivals, college shows and radio events. The band performed at Coachella as a main stage highlight in April 2016.

During their stint at Coachella in 2016, the band recorded a four-song EP titled We Were the Weirdos between performances. The EP was co-produced by Lars Stalfors in Los Angeles and released during their second weekend performance at Coachella. They announced the EP while performing on stage and also premiered one of the tracks, "Please No More".

=== 2018–2019: Almost Everyday and various singles ===
The duo took much of 2017 off after Schifino suffered an ACL injury during a performance in Mexico. In January 2018, they released a new song, "Forever", featuring Mark Hoppus and SWMRS. The single was the band's first new song since the release of the We Were The Weirdos EP two years prior. The duo also announced an upcoming studio album (their sixth) due to be released on the FADER Label in the spring of 2018. The release was to coincide with a two-month North American tour. The second single, "Like I Used to Be", which features Travis Hawley of Night Riots, was released on February 23, 2018, after a snippet was previewed on Matt and Kim's YouTube channel a week earlier. The same day, they revealed that the new album was called Almost Everyday, the album art, and the tracklist. On March 23, 2018, they released the third single, "Happy If You're Happy", and put the album up for pre-order. The fourth single, "Glad I Tried", which features Kevin Ray of Walk the Moon, Travis Hawley of Night Riots, and Santigold, was released on April 13, 2018. The album was released on May 4, 2018.

During the 2018 Christmas/New Year break, the band were approached to write an original song, "Come Together Now", for the closing credits of The Lego Movie 2: The Second Part, releasing February 8, 2019. "Come Together Now" was issued as a free standing single on February 11, 2019, as a result.

In June 2019, they launched "The Matt and Kim Podcast" series, regularly presenting hypothetical situations and how they might react. Over Summer 2019, while performing at Maha Festival in Omaha, Nebraska, Schifino again tore her ACL, but this time less severely. With dedicated physical therapy, they were able to complete an already planned and on-sale extensive US tour during October and November celebrating the ten-year anniversary of their breakthrough second album GRAND. They performed the album in its entirety, adding periodical multimedia documenting the actual recording process. Some of the dates offered the audience an opportunity to participate in the aforementioned Matt and Kim Podcast, recording episodes as part of early admission at those respective shows.

Fall 2019 also saw the release of two new singles, "GO GO" and "Money". Both were accompanied by official music videos.

=== 2021: Various singles and EPs, PG14 ===
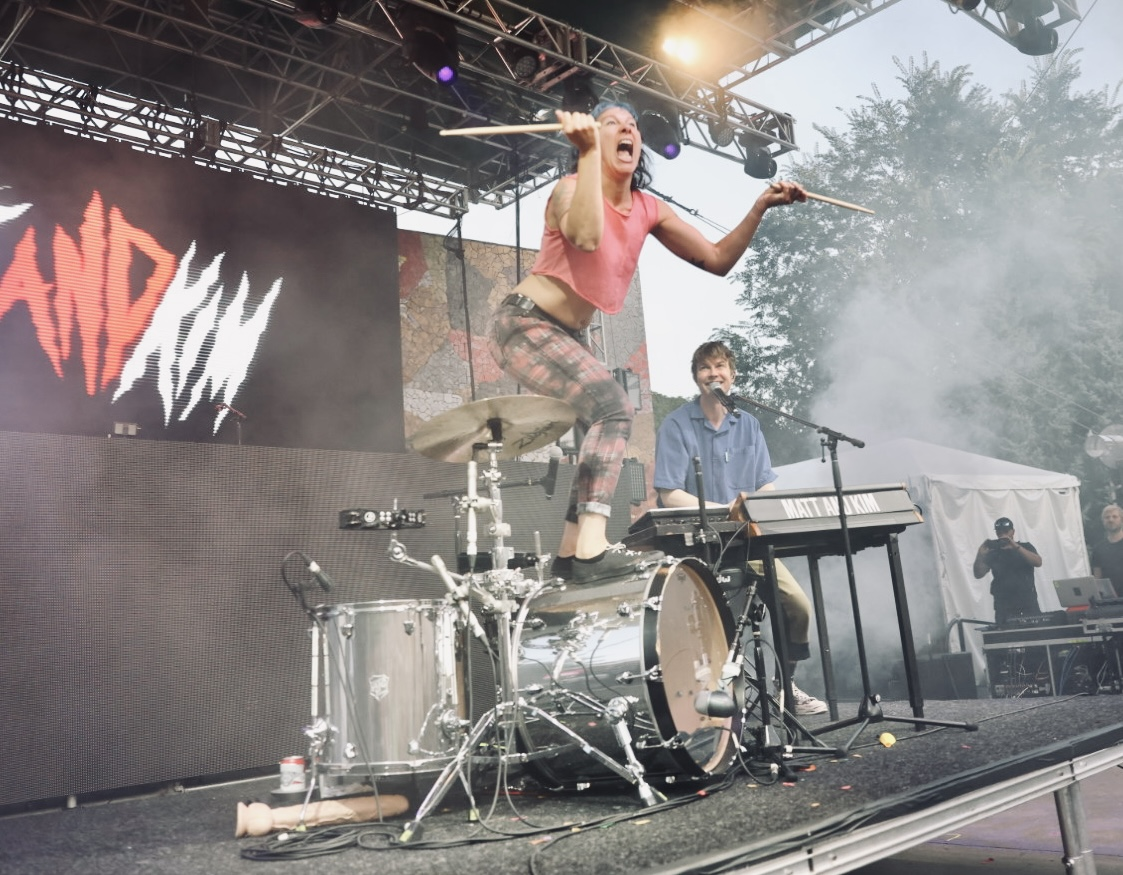
Matt and Kim perform at Bumbershoot in Seattle in 2023.

After a year plus of silence, the band released their version of Lesley Gore's "You Don't Own Me" on March 8, 2021, in honor of International Women's Day. It was followed on May 14 with "Be Kind Rewind", a seven song cover EP. Included were their versions of songs by The Flaming Lips, Crosby, Stills, Nash & Young, Lana Del Rey, Travis Scott, The Shins, King Princess and Jeremih.

Their first original song since 2019, "RARARA" dropped on June 16, 2021, on FADER Label with an official video to follow a month later on July 12. This was followed on August 13 by "Everyone Sucks But You", a co-write between the band and K.Flay, who is also featured.

As with the previous two tracks, a new digital only single, "Steal a Yellow Cab" appeared on October 8 with an accompanying video dropping a few days later on October 13.

On February 21, 2023, Matt and Kim uploaded the first video on a new TikTok page, PG14, announcing their new band. PG14, which is still only Matt and Kim, was created so they could make a new sound unlike their previous efforts under the name Matt and Kim, that sound being described as synth-garage-punk. They would then upload the PG14 debut EP titled, YES PLEASE, consisting of four tracks, on April 6, 2023.

== Personal life ==
Matt Johnson and Kim Schifino are a romantic couple.

== Musical style ==
Matt and Kim's music has often been described as dance-pop with pop-punk and hip-hop influences. In an interview with The A.V. Club, Johnson even noted, "We considered what made the Matt and Kim sound to be our mutual love for pop-punk and hip-hop, breaking down the beat and melodies the way hip-hop does, and adding in the energy and poppiness of pop-punk." Johnson and Schifino also share a mutual love for the music of Beyoncé and Jay Z. The music has also frequently been described as upbeat, enthusiastic, and energetic. Others have noted that Matt and Kim songs follow a basic pattern and that the music is simultaneously "elementary" and "ultra-entertaining".

Their live shows have achieved a great deal of recognition for their high-energy, "riotous", and party-like atmosphere. They have been known to infuse their live sets with samples or covers of songs including Ludacris' "Move Bitch" and Europe's "The Final Countdown". Their performance style generally stays the same, regardless of the size of the venue or the crowd. During shows, the band has also encouraged crowd surfing.

== Critical reception ==
In a review for Paste, Jeremy Medina called the duo's music "impeccably crafted indie dance tunes buoyed by disarmingly catchy, bustling beats." Reviewing Lightning for Consequence of Sound, Chris Coplan noted, "it's no small feat that the duo continues to keep things intriguing, perpetually culling newer, fresher influences." Their live shows have also been praised for having a "good-time loft party vibe" that is "less conventional concert and more intimate."

== Discography ==
=== Studio albums ===
| Title | Details | Peak chart positions | | | | Sales |
| Title | Details | US | US Alt | US Indie | US Rock | Sales |
|---|---|---|---|---|---|---|
| Matt & Kim | Release date: October 26, 2006; Label: IHEARTCOMIX; Formats: LP, CD, music download | — | — | — | — | |
| Grand | Release date: January 20, 2009; Label: Fader Label; Formats: LP, CD, music download | 165 | — | 24 | — | |
| Sidewalks | Release date: November 2, 2010; Label: Fader Label; Formats: LP, CD, music download | 30 | 5 | 6 | 5 | |
| Lightning | Release date: October 2, 2012; Label: Fader Label; Formats: LP, CD, music download, | 50 | 13 | 10 | 21 | US: 49,000 |
| New Glow | Release date: April 7, 2015; Label: Harvest Records (U.S.) Virgin EMI Records (International); Formats: LP, CD, music download | 33 | 5 | 3 | 5 | |
| Almost Everyday | Release date: May 4, 2018; Label: Fader Label; Formats: LP, CD, music download | — (Note: "Almost Everyday" did not enter the Billboard 200 chart, but peaked at number 70 on the Album Sales chart.) | — (Note: "Almost Everyday" did not enter the Alternative Albums chart, but peaked at number 14 on the Alternative Album Sales chart.) | 18 | — (Note: "Almost Everyday" did not enter the Top Rock Albums chart, but peaked at number 21 on the Rock Album Sales chart.) | |
"—" denotes a title that did not chart, or was not released in that territory.

=== Singles ===
| Year | Single | Peak positions | | | | | Certifications (sales threshold) | Album |
| Year | Single | US | US Alt. | US Dance | US Rock | MEX Air. | Certifications (sales threshold) | Album |
|---|---|---|---|---|---|---|---|---|
| 2006 | "5k" / "Silver Tiles" (demo) | — | — | — | — | — | | To/From EP |
| 2007 | "Yea Yeah" | — | — | — | — | — | | Matt & Kim |
| 2009 | "Daylight" | 95 | — | — | — | — | US: Gold | Grand |
| 2009 | "Lessons Learned" | — | — | — | — | 15 | | Grand |
| 2009 | "Good Ol' Fashion Nightmare" | — | — | — | — | — | | Grand |
| 2010 | "Cameras" | — | — | — | — | 31 | | Sidewalks |
| 2011 | "Block After Block" | — | — | 6 | — (Note: "Block After Block" did not enter the Rock Songs chart, but peaked at number 19 on the Rock Digital Songs chart.) | — | | Sidewalks |
| 2011 | "I'm a Goner" (featuring Soulja Boy and Andrew W.K.) | — | — | — | — | — | | Non-album single |
| 2012 | "Let's Go" | — | 20 | — | 42 | — | | Lightning |
| 2012 | "Now" | — | — | — | — | — | | Lightning |
| 2013 | "It's Alright" | — | — | — | — | — | | Lightning |
| 2015 | "Get It" | — | 25 | — | 46 | — | | New Glow |
| 2015 | "Hey Now" | — | — | — | — | — | | New Glow |
| 2015 | "Can You Blame Me" | — | — | — | — | — | | New Glow |
| 2015 | "Hoodie On" | — | — | — | — | — | | New Glow |
| 2018 | "Forever" | — | — | — | — | — | | Almost Everyday |
| 2018 | "Like I Used to Be" | — | — | — | — | — | | Almost Everyday |
| 2018 | "Happy if You're Happy" | — | — | — | — | — | | Almost Everyday |
| 2018 | "Glad I Tried" | — | — | — | — | 15 | | Almost Everyday |
| 2019 | "Come Together Now" | — | — | — | — | — | | The Lego Movie 2: The Second Part (Original Motion Picture Soundtrack) |
| 2019 | "Go Go" | — | — | — | — | — | | Non-album single |
| 2019 | "Money" | — | — | — | — | — | | Non-album single |
| 2021 | "Rarara" | — | — | — | — | — | | TBA |
"—" denotes a title that did not chart, or was not released in that territory.

=== Extended plays ===
- To/From (2005)
- We Were the Weirdos (2016)
- Be Kind Rewind (2021)

=== Music videos ===
- "5k" (original version)
- "Yea Yeah"
- "Daylight"
- "Lessons Learned"
- "Cameras"
- "Block After Block"
- "I'm a Goner"
- "Let's Go"
- "It's Alright"
- "Hey Now"
- "Can You Blame Me"
- "Let's Run Away"
- "Forever"
- "Go Go"
- "Money"

== In popular culture ==
In 2009, their song "Daylight" was featured in a Bacardi commercial and a Mars Bar commercial. During the first episode of Community, the song "Good Ol' Fashioned Nightmare" plays, and in the credits of the second episode the song "Daylight" plays. "Daylight" appeared in the opening credits of the 2016 movie Dirty Grandpa. "Daylight" was used on the ending credits in Season 6 of the TV series Entourage and in the season 5 finale of the TV show Skins. On August 26, 2009, Matt and Kim played the song "Daylight" on Jimmy Kimmel Live!. The track is featured on NBA Live 10, and as a remixed version featuring De La Soul on EA Sports game, FIFA 10. "Daylight" is also on the Need for Speed: Nitro soundtrack. The song also appeared in the game The Sims 3: World Adventures; re-recorded into Simlish, the gibberish language used in the game.

Their song "Cameras" was used in an advertisement for Tune Up in which they were also featured. "Cameras" was also used in the trailer for the Morgan Spurlock film The Greatest Movie Ever Sold and appears on its soundtrack album. Their song "Don't Slow Down" was used in commercials for the MTV series Underemployed and was also used in the first episode of the third Gossip Girl season. "Let's Go" was used in promos for the TV show The Mindy Project; on October 1, 2012, Matt and Kim performed the song on Late Night with Jimmy Fallon. Their song "AM/FM Sound" was featured in the episode of Chuck, "Chuck Versus the Gobbler", and as a backing song in an episode of Covert Affairs.

In 2013, "It's Alright" was used in the teaser of CS50 Fair 2013 which is a course offered by Harvard on-campus and online as well as for free on edX and is attended by millions from all over the world. In 2014, "It's Alright" was used in several Buick car commercials. During the holiday season, a "sleigh bell" remix is used.

In January 2015, their single "Get It" appeared in the series promo for the FXX show Man Seeking Woman.

In February 2015, their song "Don't Slow Down" was used in a commercial for Acura, and in October 2015 a series of advertisements for Royal Caribbean Cruise Lines featured the song "Get It". Since 2016, "Let's Run Away" has been used to advertise the Google Pixel smartphone.

In May 2017, their song "Can You Blame Me" was featured in the film Diary of a Wimpy Kid: The Long Haul.

In February 2018, their song "Can You Blame Me" was used on Facebook as background music to generated birthday videos summarizing related activity.

In 2021, their song "Come Together Now", itself originally from The LEGO Movie 2, was featured in the film Peter Rabbit 2: The Runaway.

In 2026, vocals from their 2021 cover of the Flaming Lips song "Do You Realize??" were featured in trailers for the film Clayface.
