= Ella Jane =

American singer and songwriter

- Born: Ella Jane Roth; 7 November 2001 (age 24); Manhattan, New York, U.S.
- Origin: Westchester County, New York, U.S.
- Years active: 2019–present
- Labels: Fader Label

Ella Jane Roth (born 7 November 2001), is an American singer-songwriter. She is known for her two albums, This is Not What it Looks Like! (2021) and Marginalia (2022).

== Early life and education ==
Roth was born in Manhattan and raised in Westchester County, New York to a Jewish family. Her father, a jazz pianist, named her after singer Ella Fitzgerald. She began playing the piano when she was four years old and she started songwriting when she was eleven. Roth attended Tufts University in the fall of 2020 as an English major. She dropped out to move to Brooklyn and pursue music full-time.

== Career ==
In February 2020, she independently released "The City" using GarageBand. This was followed "Nothing Else I Could Do" in July 2020. It was written in isolation during the COVID-19 pandemic after a creative and emotional rut. For her final creative project in AP English Literature and Composition, she chose to write a song inspired by The Great Gatsby. She posted the song on TikTok in October 2020. The Tiktok video of her performance of the song went viral, gathering over 2 million views. Roth was signed to Fader Label in 2020. Following the viral success of “Nothing Else I Could Do” on TikTok, she signed with the label later that year.

Fader Label released Ella Jane's debut album, This is Not What it Looks Like!, on September 10, 2021. Her single, "Calling Card," released on October 26, 2021 and has over 500,000 streams on Spotify. Roth performed her track "Calling Card" on Elton John's Rocket Hour radio show on Apple Music.

In 2022, "Nothing Else I Could Do" was featured as part of the soundtrack of the Netflix TV series, Heartstopper. In 2022, she relocated to Los Angeles after living for a year in Brooklyn. On October 28, 2022, Roth released her second album, Marginalia. In 2022, she released the pop song "Sore Loser" with Charlie Hickey. Roth cites singers Lorde, Taylor Swift, and Phoebe Bridgers, among her lyrical influences. In 2023, Ella Jane posted on her Instagram the album "Circuitos Sintéticos" by Brazilian music producer Arlyzinho BR, gaining recognition on various Brazilian news portals. As of 2026, Ella Jane continues to release new music, including singles such as “When I Was Beautiful,” “10-Blade,” “Sky King,” and “Seattle,” which were released in late 2025 and are on major streaming platforms, like Apple Music and Spotify.

== Discography ==
List of EPs
Title	Details
This Is Not What It Looks Like!	Released: September 10, 2021; Label: Fader Label
Marginalia	Released: October 28, 2022; Label: Fader Label
