= The Hunna =

British rock band

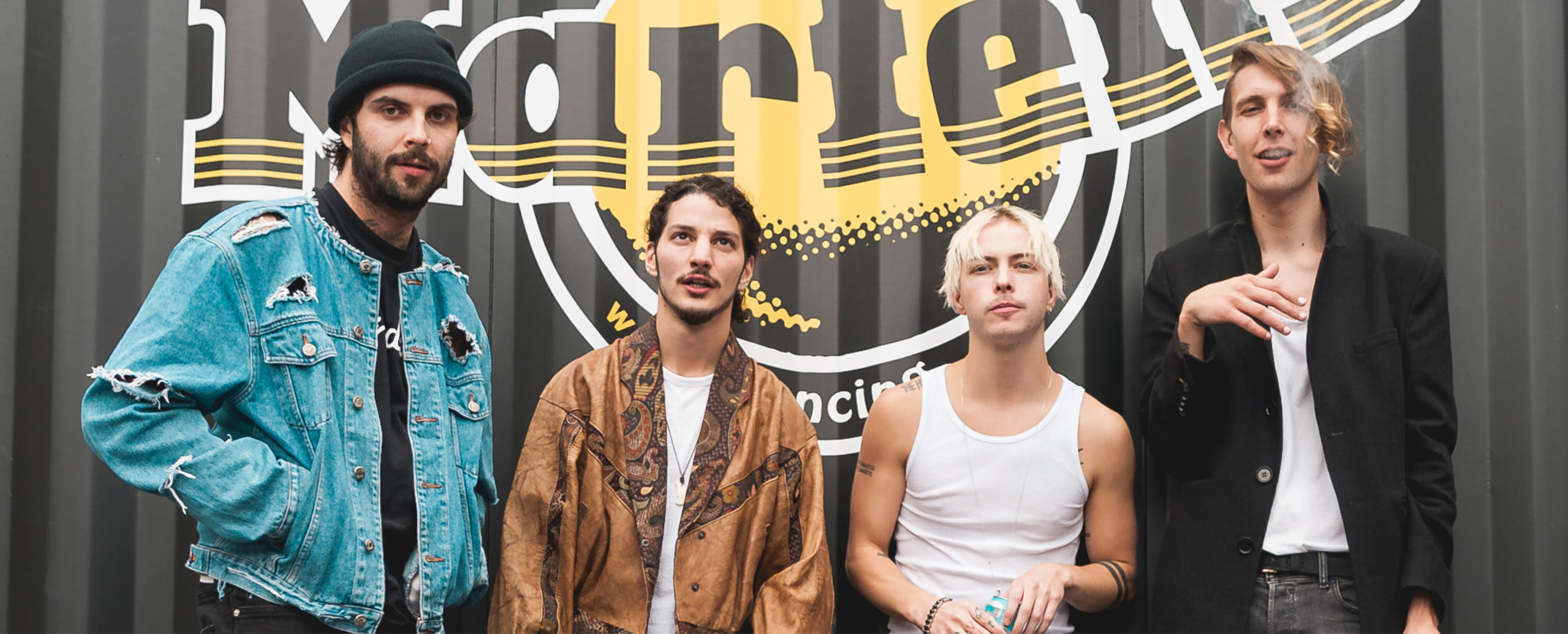
- The Hunna in 2019

Background information
- Origin: Watford, Hertfordshire, England
- Genres: Indie rock, alternative rock, pop rock
- Years active: 2015–present
- Labels: LMW Records, 300 Entertainment, Warner Music
- Members: Ryan Potter; Daniel Dorney; Jack Metcalfe
- Past members: Junate Angin

The Hunna are an English indie rock band from Watford, Hertfordshire, formed in 2015. The band members are singer/guitarist Ryan (Tino) Potter, lead guitarist Daniel (Dan, BD) Dorney, bassist Junate (Jermaine) Angin and drummer Jack (IK) Metcalfe. The band takes inspiration from a wide range of sources, including bands like Kings Of Leon, Foals, The 1975, You Me at Six and Queen.

== History ==
=== Formation and early beginnings ===
Members Dan and Ryan met while attending West Herts College's Watford campus. Dan and Junate had known each other for several years and learned to play guitar together. Eventually, they met Jack and the four later formed the band together. According to the band, the name comes from using the slang term "'Hunna' in everyday language with each other... We put 'the' in front and landed on 'The Hunna'. The name is also what we are really all about, we give 100% in our music and in our dumb lives." They also cite a major hip-hop influence for the band name. They released their first single "Bonfire" in October 2015.

=== 2016–present ===
At the beginning of 2016 they released their second single "We Could Be." The Hunna performed at Reading and Leeds Festival and Dot-to-Dot Festival and performed on the BBC Introducing Stage in Summer 2016. In August 2016, The Hunna released their sixteen-track debut album 100, produced by Tim Larcombe and Duncan Mills. The album debuted at #3 on the UK Indie Chart, and #13 on the Official UK Album Chart. In the United States, it peaked at #36 on the Heat Seekers chart. The album's lead single, "You and Me" made it to U.S alternative radio including Sirius XM Alt Nation, Music Choice and peaked at number 28 on the U.S. Alternative Songs. The Hunna toured with Jimmy Eat World in autumn 2016. They headlined Alt Nation's Advanced Placement tour in late 2016 with Night Riots and The Shelters.

Following a headline '100' tour in January 2017, they headlined the Festival Republic stage at Reading & Leeds festival in 2017, where they first announced they were in the process of writing their second album Dare. The Hunna were on the line-up for Community Festival in Finsbury Park, London on 1 July 2017.

After their success on the festival stage during 2017, they announced a 2nd '100' tour, but this time playing in UK, Europe, Australia and USA with Night Riots and Coasts supporting. This included two nights at Brixton Academy in London on 12 and 13 January 2018, the latter of which sold out, prompting them to extend these dates to a full UK Headline tour in January. They also played at All Points East festival in Victoria Park, London in June 2018.

Their album Dare was released on 13 July. In the week of release, they played intimate shows in and around the country where they played the album in full. The venues included KOKO in London and The Plug in Sheffield.

Another tour was announced shortly after, including their biggest ever headline show which should have taken place at Alexandra Palace on 21 November 2018 but was cancelled, due to a change in record label. The band a week later posted a rescheduled UK and European tour, with the Alexandra Palace date changed to another date at Brixton Academy. The support for the new tour was Barns Courtney announced via another Instagram post.

Throughout their 2019 headline shows and festival slots they played two new songs "IGHTF" and "DGAF". The week that The Hunna played the main stage at Reading and Leeds Festival in August 2019 the band released "IGHTF" as a single, about the departure from their old record label. They also played TRNSMT, alongside Catfish and the Bottlemen and Bastille, where they closed the Kings Tut stage. Speaking about their TRNSMT debut, The Hunna said: "We are so honored to be closing the King Tuts Stage this year at TRNSMT festival! We remember getting our name put on the steps of the venue with some of our favourite bands/artists and feeling very proud. We can't wait to get on that stage and tear it up. See you all there!"

On 9 October 2019, the band announced they had begun recording their third studio album with producer John Feldmann. On 28 February 2020, they released the single "Cover You" which featured Travis Barker and announced their upcoming album I'd Rather Die Than Let You In. On 1 May, they released the single "Dark Times" (co-written with Josh Dun from Twenty One Pilots). In July, they released the song "I Wanna Know". On 2 October 2020, I'd Rather Die Than Let You In was released. In November, they released a new version of "Lost" with OMB Peezy. On 16 July 2021, the deluxe edition of I'd Rather Die Than Let You In was released.

On 30th June 2026, the band announced dates for their final tour in November-December 2026 on their Facebook page.

== Hard as Hell ==
On 10 September, The Hunna posted on Instagram about a secret project they had been working on and said "Go follow @hard.as.hell Soon it wil all make sense. "Hard as Hell is something we've been working on for the past 9 months, it's an opportunity we've always dreamt of having and something we're incredibly passionate about," The Hunna said about their upcoming collection. "Everyone in life gets thrown devastating, rough and heartbreaking curveballs to feel and overcome and fuck it's Hard as Hell. Our first launch goes by the name 'One Hell of a Gory Story'. We hope you find yours."

The collection launched on 14 October 2019, with a three-minute fashion film.

== Discography ==
=== Studio albums ===
Title	Album details	Peak chart positions	Certifications
Title	Album details	UK	Certifications
100	Released: 26 August 2016; Label: 300 Entertainment, High Time, Warner	13	BPI: Gold
Dare	Released: 13 July 2018; Label: High Time	12	
I'd Rather Die Than Let You In	Released: 2 October 2020; Label: LMW Records	59	
The Hunna	Released: 28 October 2022; Label: LMW Records	30	

=== Singles ===
Title	Year	Certifications	Album
"Bonfire"	2015	BPI: Gold	100
"She's Casual"	2016	BPI: Platinum	100
"You & Me"	2016		100
"Summer"	2017		Dare
"Dare"	2017		Dare
"Flickin' Your Hair"	2018		Dare
"Y.D.W.I.W.M"	2018		Dare
"NY to LA"	2018		Dare
"IGHTF"	2019		Non-album single
"Cover You" (featuring Travis Barker)	2020		I'd Rather Die Than Let You In
"Dark Times" (featuring Josh Dun)	2020		I'd Rather Die Than Let You In
"Bad Place"	2021		I'd Rather Die Than Let You In (Deluxe)
"Trash"	2022		The Hunna
"Fugazi"	2022		The Hunna
