= New York City Department of Bridges =

Former New York City government agency

Agency overview
- Formed: January 1, 1898
- Dissolved: 1916
- Superseding agency: New York City Department of Plant & Structures
- Type: Department
- Jurisdiction: Government of New York City
- Status: Defunct
- Headquarters: New York City
- Agency executive: Commissioner of Bridges; Consulting Engineer
- Parent agency: New York City Board of Public Improvements
- Key document: New York City Charter

The New York City Department of Bridges was a municipal government agency that administered the planning, construction, management, and maintenance of bridges in New York City. The department was created in 1898 with the consolidation of Greater New York, and it operated as one of six co-equal branches of the New York City Board of Public Improvements. It was later merged with the Department of Public Works in 1916 to form the Department of Plant & Structures. Its present-day successor is the New York City Department of Transportation.

Prior to the Department's formation, the work of building and managing transportation infrastructure in the Greater New York area was generally overseen by county-level Boards of Supervisors and their associated Highway Commissioners. When the city was consolidated under a singular charter in 1898, responsibility for all bridge crossings (including minor roadway spans in the outer boroughs of Brooklyn and Queens) was also consolidated–much to the disagreement of existing highway commissioners.

== Organization ==
Most of the department's workforce included designers and tradesmen in a variety of support roles, including engineers, riggers, and even firemen. One record from 1900 counts the organization's maintenance division alone at about 480 workers, with moveable bridge-tenders comprising the largest individual trade. The department's leadership consisted of a Commissioner of Bridges and a Consulting Engineer. Appointed by the Mayor of New York City, the Commissioner of Bridges was a mayoral cabinet-level position tasked with administration of the entire department and its divisions. According to the original city charter, the commissioner was also charged with overseeing departmental finances, toll collection, bridge construction and maintenance, and operation of the Brooklyn Bridge trolleys.

Former bridge commissioners of New York City
	Name	Term	Appointed by
1	John L. Shea	1898-1901	Robert A. Van Wyck
2	Gustav Lindenthal	1902-1903	Seth Low
3	George E. Best	1904-1905	George B. McClellan Jr.
4	James W. Stevenson	1906-1909	George B. McClellan Jr.
5	Kingsley L. Martin	1910-1911	William J. Gaynor
6	Arthur J. O'Keeffe	1911-1913	William J. Gaynor
7	F.J.H. Kracke	1914-1915	John P. Mitchel

== Notable projects ==
During its existence, the Department of Bridges initiated and managed the construction of many significant bridges in New York City:

- Williamsburg Bridge (initially known as the "East River Bridge")
- Manhattan Bridge
- Queensboro Bridge
- Hell Gate Bridge
- Madison Avenue Bridge
- University Heights Bridge
- 145th Street Bridge
- Grand Street Bridge
