= Motor Function =

EP by Binki
- Released: August 13, 2021
- Recorded: 2019–2020
- Genre: Hip hop
- Length: 10:38
- Label: Fader Label
- Producers: SADPONY; Justin Raisen; Chasen Smith; Nate Donmoyer; SLATERS

Motor Function (stylized in all caps) is the debut EP by American singer-songwriter and rapper Binki. It was released on August 13, 2021 through Fader Label.

Motor Function was met with acclaim from music critics, who praised Binki's blending of genres and his energy on the album.

== Background and recording ==
Prior to Motor Function, Binki had been releasing singles after he shifted focus from acting pursuits toward venturing into music following his graduation from university in 2018, and subsequent move to New York City. Garnering attention from music media outlets for these singles, The Line of Best Fit's Hannah Browne wrote that Binki developed a reputation for "gritty, punkish energy" due to his "novel fusion of sophisticated pop, brattish indie, grungy rap, and the majority in between." Based in Brooklyn, Binki has cited the borough's "genre-less" approach to music, as well as the "kinetic energy" of New York's music scene as inspiration for Motor Function.

Binki's debut EP, Motor Function also drew inspiration from his quarantine stemming from the COVID-19 pandemic. The EP's intro track, "Clay Pigeon", as well as "Landline" were both recorded remotely. The first song finished for Motor Function, "Revolve" was written and recorded in one day. "Revolve" included "glitchy vocals and creeping synth." The song also layered "heavy drums and guitars interspersed with short electronic instruments."

The EP includes Binki's commentary on themes such as "vulnerability, youthful frustration, and broken relationships."

== Release and singles ==
In May 2021, Binki released the single "Clay Pigeon". "Revolve" was then released on June 30. The EP was released through Fader Label shortly thereafter, on August 13.

== Critical reception ==
Motor Function received praise from music reviewers, who noted its tracks to have an appealing raw kineticism. Margaret Farrell, writing for Flood Magazine, stated the tracks on Motor Function "are a spectrum of thrills", pointing to the "pummeling bass" on "Revolve", as well as the "grime and glamour" of "Landline". Farrell went on to say "Binki's vocals are commanding without being overbearing," noting the juxtaposition of the "rich" delivery on his singing vocals and the "harshness of his spoken-word" segments. Farrell opined that "the overall intensity of Motor Function is an electric balm in a year with much need for catharsis."

Sophie Williams of NME wrote that Motor Function is a "medley of genre-splicing anthems that ring in your ears for days afterwards," and noted that Binki's commentary on the project's themes "[tumble] out of him with audacious energy over stop-start riffs and ear-bending beats." Williams went on to rate the EP four out five stars; in her review, Williams praised the EP as "wonderfully tight and electric", stating it established Binki as "a versatile singer-songwriter, whose magnetic choruses thrive off duelling forces of freedom and anxiety." Williams called "Revolve" a "highlight" on the EP, writing that the song "upholds the EP's overarching acceptance of difficult truths as it moves into the murky territory of romantic frustration." "Landline" was part of the 2021 game FIFA 22

== Track listing ==
Motor Function track listing
No.	Title	Writer(s)	Producer(s)	Length
1.	"Clay Pigeon"	Chasen Smith; Baraka Ongeri	SADPONY; Justin Raisen; Chasen Smith	2:29
2.	"Landline"	Smith; Ongeri	SADPONY; Justin Raisen; Chasen Smith	2:40
3.	"Revolve"	Nate Donmoyer; Ongeri	Nate Donmoyer	2:52
4.	"Invisible Fence"	Alex Craig; Al Carson; Ongeri	SLATERS; SADPONY; Justin Raisen	2:35
Total length:				10:38
