= Fader Label =

American record label

FADER Label
- Founded: 2002; 23 years ago
- Founder: Rob Stone; Jon Cohen
- Distributor(s): Virgin Music Group
- Country of origin: United States
- Location: New York City, U.S.
- Official website: fader-label.com

FADER Label is an American independent record label founded in 2002 by Rob Stone and Jon Cohen. They are currently based in New York City.

== History ==
FADER Label was founded in 2002 by Rob Stone and Jon Cohen. In January 2016 the label established a distribution deal with Caroline Distribution, an independent service and distribution division of Capitol Music Group.

In October 2019, the label officially announced the expansion of its staff, marking the largest team in its 17-year history, as well as new additions to its artist roster.

== Artists ==
- Binki
- Charlie Burg
- Chloe George
- country girl
- Daniel Noah Miller
- EFÉ
- Kristiane
- James Ivy
- Lewis Del Mar
- Ella Jane
- Matt and Kim
- Peter Xan
- Tariq Al-Sabir
- Wavedash
- Zachary Knowles

== Catalog artists ==
- Neon Indian
- Yuna
- Saul Williams
- The Bots
- Alan Vega
- Editors
- The Cool Kids
- Slayyyter
- Clairo

== Releases ==
- The Inevitable Rise and Liberation of NiggyTardust! – Saul Williams (2007)
- From the Mountain to the Sea – Birdmonster (2008)
- Grand – Matt and Kim (2009)
- In This Light and on This Evening – Editors (2009)
- Sidewalks – Matt and Kim (2010)
- Decorate (EP) – Yuna (2011)
- Yuna – Yuna (2012)
- Lightning – Matt and Kim (2012)
- We Were the Weirdos – Matt and Kim (2016)
- Diary 001 (EP) – Clairo (2018)
- Almost Everyday – Matt and Kim (2018)
- Immunity – Clairo (2019)
- August – Lewis Del Mar (2020)
- Motor Function – Binki (2021)
- Troubled Paradise – Slayyyter (2021)
- Sling – Clairo (2021)
- This Is Not What It Looks Like! (EP) – Ella Jane (2021)
- Starfucker – Slayyyter (2023)
