= Clay pigeon floor procedure =

Maneuver to gain political leverage in the US Senate

The clay pigeon floor procedure is a rare maneuver employed to gain political leverage in the United States Senate. The name is an analogy to the clay target that shatters upon impact in skeet shooting. In the procedure, an amendment comprising multiple proposals is shattered by demand of a single Senator into individual components to be discussed separately. A pre-agreed vote is taken to limit the total debate on the amendment. This requires a supermajority of 60 votes to abbreviate the debate, and all components are scheduled for a vote at the end of the allotted time.

== Instances ==
Two distinct goals have been recognized in the history of the procedure. Because individual features of an amendment are exposed to public airing, the process may coerce greater accountability. By contrast, in its most recent engagement, the Democratic majority used the tactic to curtail debate on immigration reform, thereby containing opposition.

- June 2007, Harry Reid (D), Nevada
- April 2006, Tom Coburn (R), Oklahoma
- circa 1970, James Allen (D), Alabama
