= Daylight (Matt and Kim song) =

Single by Matt and Kim

from the album Grand
- Released: 2008
- Genre: Indie pop (original); Hip hop, electro (Troublemaker remix)
- Length: 2:51
- Label: Fader Label
- Songwriter(s): Matt Johnson, Kim Schifino

Matt and Kim singles chronology
"Yea Yeah" (2006)	"Daylight" (2008)	"Lessons Learned" (2009)

"Daylight" is a song by American indie pop duo Matt and Kim. It was the first single from their second studio album Grand. The duo performed this song on August 26, 2009 on the Jimmy Kimmel Live! show. The song appears in the video game NBA Live 10 and is the only non-hip hop song on the soundtrack. The "Troublemaker" Remix of the song, featuring De La Soul, is included on the soccer video game FIFA 10, Need for Speed: Nitro, and also included in NBA Live 10. The song also appears in The Sims 3: World Adventures, translated into Simlish.

== Song ==
Taking seven months to make, "Daylight" was written and performed by Matt and Kim, which consists of vocalist and keyboardist Matt Johnson and drummer Kim Schifino. Johnson recorded, mixed and produced the track, with additional production and recording from Colby Dix. Joe LaPorta finally mastered the track at The Lodge in New York City. Lyrically, the song deals with longing for home, and includes brief descriptions about life on Grand Street in Brooklyn, New York.

== Music video ==
The music video has gained much popularity on YouTube, reaching over 23 million views. The music video shows the duo playing the song "Daylight" in crowded, often uncomfortable spaces; in beds, fridges, dumpsters, taxis, etc.

== Release and reception ==
"Daylight" was released in the United States in 2008 by Green Label Sound, and in the United Kingdom by Nettwerk. It was issued as the lead single off Matt and Kim's second studio album Grand, where it is also listed as the opening track. It debuted on the US Billboard Bubbling Under Hot 100 Singles at number 6 on the week ending June 20, 2009. The next week, the song entered the Hot 100 at its peak position of number 95, with downloads increasing 22% to 22,000 from the previous week. The song's success was partially due to its appearance in an ad for Bacardi.

== Live performances ==
Matt and Kim performed "Daylight" at the 2011 O Music Awards. In August 2012, they performed the song at the 2012 vitaminwater uncapped and Fader event in Detroit.

== In other media ==
- The song was featured on an episode of the NBC comedy Community, on an episode of 90210 and on an episode of Skins.
- The song was featured on an Australian Mars Bar commercial.
- The song was featured on a Comcast Xfinity commercial (2012).
- The song was featured on a Bacardi commercial (2009).
- The song was featured in the opening credits of the movie Dirty Grandpa.
- The song, along with the Troublemaker remix featuring De La Soul, are both featured in the EA Sports game, NBA Live 10.
- The song is also featured on the 2010 skateboarding game, Shaun White Skateboarding.
- The special version of this song in language Simlish was featured on the expansion pack The Sims 3: World Adventures.

== Commercial performance ==
Charts
Country	Chart (2009)	Peak position
United States	US Billboard Hot 100	95
United States	US Heatseeker Songs (Billboard)	13

}

Certifications
Region	Certification	Certified units/sales
United States (RIAA)	Gold	500,000^{*}
^{*} Sales figures based on certification alone.
