= Night Riots =

American alternative rock band

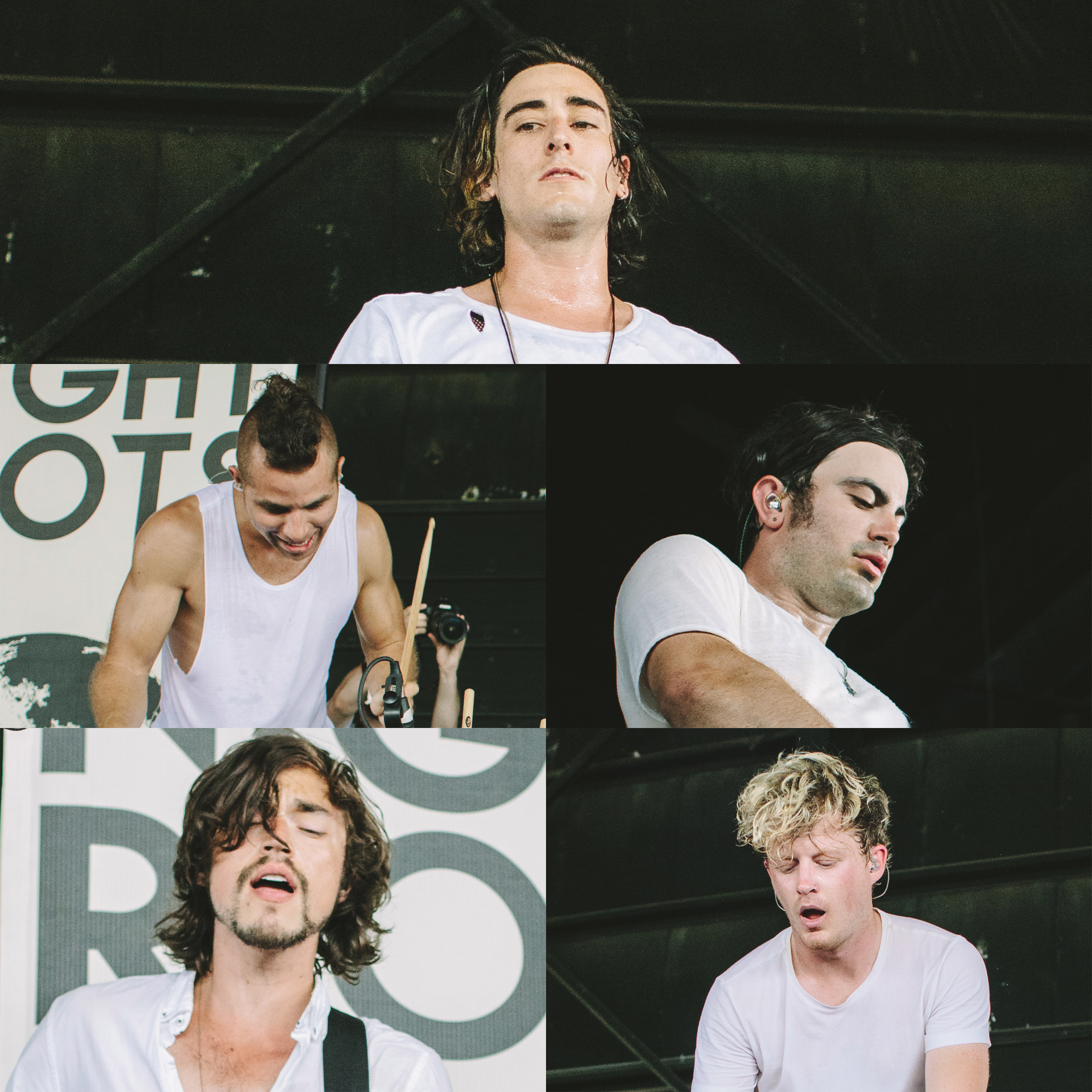
- Night Riots during Warped Tour 2015. Clockwise from top: Travis Hawley, Nick Fotinakes, Matt DePauw, Mikel van Kranenburg, Rico Rodriguez.

Background information
- Also known as: PK
- Origin: San Luis Obispo, California, United States
- Genres: Alternative rock, pop rock, power pop
- Years active: 2010–2020 (hiatus)
- Labels: Sumerian
- Past members: Travis Hawley; Nick Fotinakes; Matt DePauw; Mikel van Kranenburg; Rico Rodriguez
- Website: nightriots.com

Night Riots (sometimes stylized as NIGHT RIOTS or || NIGHT RIOTS ||) are an American alternative rock band from San Luis Obispo, California. Formed in 2010, the band consists of Travis Hawley (lead vocals), Nick Fotinakes (guitar), Matt DePauw (guitar), Mikel van Kranenburg (bass), and Rico Rodriguez (drums).

== History ==
Travis Hawley, Nick Fotinakes, Matt DePauw, Kevin Menesez and Mikel van Kranenburg were raised in Templeton, California, and they all met in middle school. They learned how to play instruments together in high school and decided to form a band. After graduating from high school, the band split for a brief period. Rico Rodriguez replaced Kevin Menesez as the drummer in 2010. The name was inspired by the character PeeKay in Australian author Bryce Courtenay's novel The Power of One. Able to relate to his "[rise] from the bottom to overcome adversity", the band agreed that he was a "pretty awesome character" and were able to take away from him that they "could indeed take over the world if we just work hard and don't let anything get in our way!" They self-released their debut studio album Into the Roaring in 2010. The band traveled and performed at high schools and college campuses on weekdays, and music venues on weekends within the same city. MTV Buzzworthy included PK on its "The Most Criminally Overlooked Artists of 2012" list.

In order to eliminate any trademark concerns with PK in the future, the band decided to change its name. The band decided on Night Riots in order to better encapsulate their sound; yearning for a "latchkey feel", they cited the energy of shows that take place at night as determining their new name. They also explained that, while PK was a "great name", its meaning was difficult to interpret and failed to project any imagery. Night Riots sought to raise money through crowd funding website Indiegogo to release their upcoming extended play (EP), where they accumulated $12,000. The money was used to independently release Young Lore on July 30, 2013.

In 2014, Night Riots debuted their single "Contagious" on radio station KROQ and supported musician K.Flay on a US tour. On October 23, 2014 they premiered their music video for Contagious through MTV and announced their signing to Sumerian Records. On January 20, 2015 their EP Howl was released and the band was spotlit by Live 105 in San Francisco as one of "Aaron Axelsen’s Top 16 New Acts To Watch In 2015". In February 2015, Night Riots embarked on their first full US headlining tour. In March and April 2015, Night Riots were main support on The Mowgli's US and Canada tour. In May 2015, Night Riots performed for the Vans Warped Tour 2015. On September 16, 2015, Night Riots performed at the debut of the new, tenth-generation Honda Civic Sedan.

In the fall of 2015 following the Vans Warped Tour, Night Riots also went to the Let The Kids Riot tour as main support to Young Rising Sons, ending the tour and gaining vast new audiences.

In the Spring of 2016, Night Riots went on tour with Blaqk Audio, opening for The Material Tour, and revisited some of the same venues in the Midwest and East Coast from the LTKR tour. For the 2016 festival season Night Riots will attend BFD, Firefly Music Festival, Osheaga Festival, and Riot Fest in both Colorado and Chicago. In October 2016, Night Riots released their new album, Love Gloom, their first full-length album under a new label. Night Riots was featured on Alt Nation's 2016 Advanced Placement Tour with The Hunna and The Shelters, running November through December.

In the spring of 2017, Andrew McMahon in the Wilderness toured the U.S. featuring Night Riots and Atlas Genius. In Summer 2017, Night Riots played two dates on All Time Low's Young Renegade Tour, in replacement of SWMRS. Night Riots opened for The Maine on The Lovely Little Lonely Tour and The Modern Nostalgia tour, which ran until November 2017. The Lovely Little Lonely tour marked the band's first European tour. Also in November 2017, Night Riots played the first night of Chicago radio station 101 WKQX's The Nights We Stole Christmas Music Festival, playing before Papa Roach and Rise Against.

Night Riots opened for The Hunna in early January 2018 on their U.K tour. Shortly after returning from that tour, Night Riots announced their first ever international headliner tour and their third venture across the atlantic. It was later announced that they would be supported by Silent Rival. On February 20, Night Riots released a new single, "Colour Morning." Another single, “On the Line” was released May 24, days before they embarked on their month-long “Dark Violet” tour. The June 2018 tour was their first cross-country headlining tour and featured the support of Silent Rival and Courtship.

After the "Dark Violet" tour, the band stayed out of the public eye for nearly a year before releasing three new singles leading up to the release of their second full-length studio album, "New State of Mind" on July 26, 2019. Night Riots embarked on a US tour of the same name to promote the album.

In August 2020, the band announced via Instagram that they would be taking an extended hiatus. They coupled this announcement with the release of a number of remixes and demos from New State of Mind.

== Musical style and influences ==
Night Riots' foundations lie within punk rock; they cite bands AFI and Thursday as their biggest influences. They also draw influence from Billy Idol, Paul Simon, Peter Gabriel, Arctic Monkeys, Atmosphere, The Cure, U2, The Killers, Vampire Weekend, The Strokes, Bruce Springsteen, INXS and Dave Gahan. PK integrated pop rock and power pop into their sound, accompanied with "introspective and emotional" lyrics with music that "is always lively and upbeat". The band changed its name to Night Riots in order to represent "its darker side as it explores the deeper aspects of music with varying tempos and somber, haunting melodies juxtaposed against uplifting choruses." An alternative rock band, they incorporate new wave music, as well as a 1980s Gothic pop feel into their current sound. Hawley distinguished Night Riots' music from PK by describing it as indie pop rock with a "dark undertone", comparing the sound to U2, The Strokes, and The Killers. He also describes the band's sound as "gloom pop" because of the vein of darkness that runs throughout the alternative/pop sounding music. Guitarist Matt DePauw described the band's sound as "catchy rock 'n' roll with a bit of pop and a bit of darkness".

Night Riots' music has been compared to The Cure and The Killers; with Hawley's "emotive vocal style" compared to that of Robert Smith. His stage presence has also been compared to Davey Havok and Brandon Flowers.

== Members ==
- Travis Hawley – lead vocals
- Nick Fotinakes – guitar
- Matt DePauw – guitar
- Mikel van Kranenburg – bass
- Rico Rodriguez – drums
- Kevin Menesez - drums through 2010 (Into the Roaring)

== Discography ==
=== Studio albums ===
| Title | Album details | Peak chart positions | Sales | Certifications |
| Title | Album details | Billboard Heatseekers Albums | Sales | Certifications |
|---|---|---|---|---|
| Love Gloom | Released: October 21, 2016; Label: Sumerian Records; Format: CD, digital download, vinyl | 15 | | |
| New State of Mind | Released: July 26, 2019; Label: Sumerian Records; Format: CD, digital download, vinyl | | | |

=== Extended plays ===
| Title | Album details | Peak chart positions |
| Title | Album details | Billboard Heatseekers Albums |
|---|---|---|
| Archives and Rarities | Released: December 4, 2012; Label: Self-released; Format: CD, digital download | — |
| Young Lore | Released: July 29, 2013; Label: Self-released; Format: CD, digital download, vinyl | — |
| Hallowed Ground | Released: 2013; Label: Self-released; Format: CD, digital download | — |
| Howl | Released: January 19, 2015; Label: Sumerian Records; Format: CD, digital download, vinyl | 17 |

=== Singles ===
| Title | Year | Peak chart positions | Album |
| Title | Year | Alternative Songs | Album |
|---|---|---|---|
| "Berelain" | 2011 | — | Non-album single |
| "Seawolves" | 2011 | — | Non-album single |
| "Chase the Sky" | 2012 | — | Non-album single |
| "Spiders" | 2013 | — | Young Lore |
| "Contagious" | 2014 | 24 | Howl |
| "Oh My Heart" | 2015 | 50 | Howl |
| "Colour Morning" | 2018 | — | New State of Mind |
| “On the Line” | 2018 | — | New State of Mind |
| "Tokyo Diamond Eyes" | 2019 | — | New State of Mind |
| "Leave Us Alone" | 2019 | — | New State of Mind |
| "Loyal to the Game" | 2019 | — | New State of Mind |
