= Matt & Kim (album) =

Studio album by Matt & Kim
- Released: October 24, 2006
- Genres: Indie pop, lo-fi
- Length: 29:13
- Label: IHeartComix
- Producer: Lars Stalfors

Matt & Kim chronology
To/From (2005)	Matt & Kim (2006)	Grand (2009)

Professional ratings
Review scores
Source	Rating
AllMusic	Positive
The Music Box	2/5 stars
Now Magazine	2/5
Pitchfork	(7.5/10)
PopMatters	6/10

Matt & Kim (alternatively known as Self Titled) is the debut album from the band Matt & Kim. It was released on October 24, 2006, on the label IHeartComix. On July 28, 2023, the album was officially made available on all digital streaming platforms after being unavailable for several years.

== Track listing ==
1. "It's a Fact (Printed Stained)" – 2:15
2. "Dash After Dash" – 3:40
3. "Yea Yeah" – 3:26
4. "Ready? OK" – 2:12
5. "No More Long Years" – 3:03
6. "5k" – 2:10
7. "Grand" – 1:41
8. "Frank" – 2:44
9. "Someday" – 3:01
10. "Light Speed" – 2:48
11. "Bonus Track" – 2:13 (starts after 60 seconds of silence; included on physical versions only)

Note: On the vinyl, 'Bonus Track' is in between 'Grand' and 'Frank'

== Music video ==
Music videos were made for the songs "Yea Yeah" and "5k", although the version of "5k" used in the music video was from their first EP To/From.
