= Binki =

American singer and songwriter

binki
- Born: Baraka Andrew Ongeri; Pennsylvania, United States
- Genres: Pop; alternative
- Occupations: Singer, songwriter
- Label: Fader Label

Baraka Andrew Ongeri, known professionally by the stage name Binki (stylized as binki), is an American singer and songwriter.

== Early life ==
Ongeri was born to Kenyan parents. From Pennsylvania, Ongeri grew up in Hershey and North Carolina. He studied to be an actor at UNC Greensboro. While in college, he began making music. Always identifying himself as actor, he thought of music as a secondary passion even after first venturing into it.

== Career ==
After college, Ongeri moved to New York City and was based in Brooklyn.

In 2018, Ongeri released his debut single "Marco". A year later, he released "Wiggle". In August 2019, he was featured in Pigeons & Planes as one of their "best new artists" of that month. He then released "Sea Sick" in September. In October, he released "Heybb!" under Fader Label, as well as its accompanying music video. The song would later be used in an Apple Inc. advertisement for the iPad Air 4. "Heybb!" and "Sea Sick" also achieved virality on TikTok. At the time, Ongeri was still training to be an actor.

In May 2021, he released the single "Clay Pigeon", and in July released "Revolve". The two singles appeared on his debut EP Motor Function, which was released in August. The EP received positive reviews from music critics. A third song, "Landline", was featured on the soundtrack of FIFA 22.

Ongeri released "Hotel Window" in March 2023, followed by "Rocket Ship" in April, and "Doomsday" in May. All three singles were featured on his second EP Antennae.

Ongeri has noted Childish Gambino, Tyler, The Creator, Will Smith, and Jamie Foxx as his "idols". A documentary on Jimi Hendrix inspired him to take guitar lessons.

== Discography ==
- Motor Function (2021)
- Antennae (2023)
- Half-Nelson (2025)
