= Clairo discography =

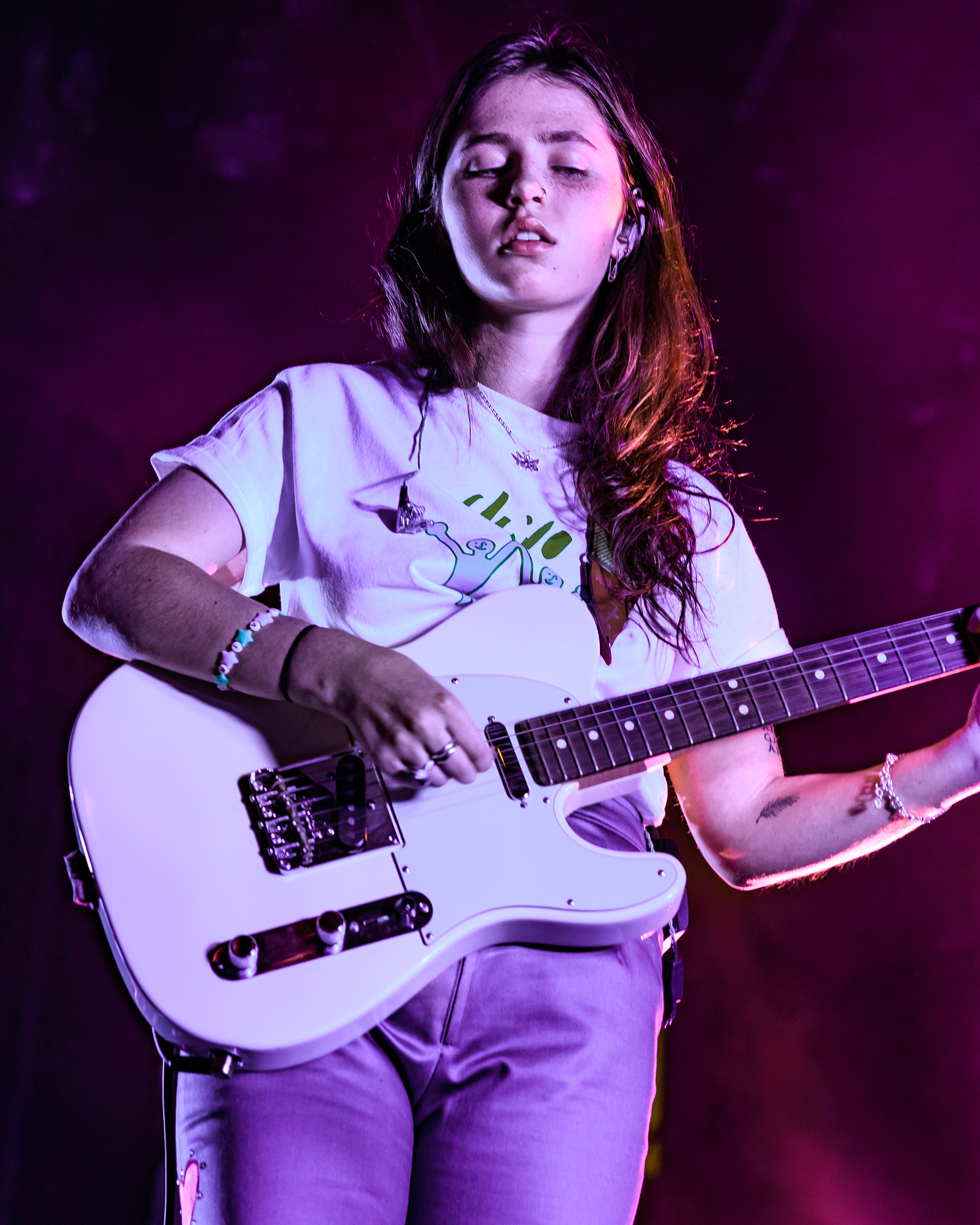
- Clairo performing in 2019
- Studio albums: 3
- EPs: 14
- Live albums: 1
- Singles: 35
- Music videos: 7

American singer-songwriter Clairo has released three studio albums, 14 extended plays (including 13 released independently as Claire Cottrill), 34 singles (including 16 as a featured artist), and seven music videos.

== Studio albums ==
Title	Details	Peak chart positions										Certifications
Title	Details	US	AUS	BEL	CAN	IRE	NED	NZ	SCO	SWI	UK	Certifications
Immunity	Released: August 2, 2019; Label: Fader Label; Formats: Digital download, streaming, CD, vinyl	51	73	—	79	—	—	—	—	—	— (Note: Immunity did not enter the UK Albums Chart, but peaked at number 90 on the UK Album Downloads Chart.)	RIAA: Gold; BPI: Silver; MC: Gold; RMNZ: Platinum
Sling	Released: July 16, 2021; Label: Fader Label, Polydor, Republic; Formats: Digital download, streaming, CD, vinyl	17	88	—	—	65	— (Note: Sling did not enter the Dutch Album Top 100, but peaked at number 16 on the Dutch Vinyl 33 Chart.)	—	9	—	73	
Charm	Released: July 12, 2024; Label: Clairo Records; Formats: Digital download, streaming, CD, vinyl	8	4	50	23	28	38	12	3	81	13	RIAA: Gold; BPI: Silver; RMNZ: Gold
"—" denotes album that did not chart or was not released in that territory.

== Extended plays ==
Title	Details	Certifications
Diary 001	Released: May 25, 2018; Label: Fader Label; Formats: Digital download, streaming, vinyl	RIAA: Gold; BPI: Silver
Live at Electric Lady	Released: May 12, 2023; Label: Fader Label, Polydor, Republic; Formats: Digital download, streaming	

=== As Claire Cottrill ===
- Do U Wanna Fall in Love? (2014)
- Love Songs 4 the Heartbroken (2015)
- Sweet (2015)
- Have a Nice Day (2015)
- Late Show (2015)
- Aquarius Boy (2015)
- Claire Cottrill (2015)
- Metal Heart (2015)
- Moth Girl (2015)
- Growing (2015)
- Creased Laundry (2016)
- Brains a Bus Station (2016)
- Split with Keel Her (2016)

== Singles ==
=== As lead artist ===
List of singles, with year released, selected chart positions, certifications, and album name shown
Title	Year	Peak chart positions										Certifications	Album
Title	Year	US	US Rock	AUS	BEL Tip	CAN	IRL	NZ Hot	POR	UK	WW	Certifications	Album
"Get with U"	2017	—	—	—	—	—	—	—	—	—	—		Non-album singles
"2 Hold U"	2017	—	—	—	—	—	—	—	—	—	—		Non-album singles
"Flaming Hot Cheetos"	2017	—	—	—	—	—	—	—	—	—	—	RIAA: 2× Platinum; BPI: Silver; RMNZ: Platinum	Diary 001
"Pretty Girl"	2017	—	—	—	—	—	—	—	—	—	—	RIAA: 2× Platinum; BPI: Silver; MC: Gold; RMNZ: Platinum	Diary 001
"4Ever"	2018	—	—	—	—	—	—	—	—	—	—	RIAA: Platinum; BPI: Silver; RMNZ: Platinum	Diary 001
"Better" (with SG Lewis)	2018	—	—	—	—	—	—	—	—	—	—		Non-album singles
"Drown" (with Cuco)	2018	—	—	—	—	—	—	—	—	—	—		Non-album singles
"Heaven"	2018	—	—	—	—	—	—	—	—	—	—		Skate Kitchen OST
"Sis"	2019	—	—	—	—	—	—	—	—	—	—		Non-album singles
"Bubble Gum"	2019	—	—	—	—	—	—	—	—	—	—	RIAA: 2× Platinum; BPI: Silver; MC: 2× Platinum; RMNZ: Platinum	Non-album singles
"Throwaway" (with SG Lewis)	2019	—	—	—	—	—	—	—	—	—	—		Dawn EP
"Bags"	2019	—	35	—	— (Note: "Bags" did not enter the Flanders Ultratop 50, but charted as an "extra tip" on the Ultratip chart.)	—	—	35	—	—	—	RIAA: Platinum; BPI: Platinum; MC: Platinum; RMNZ: Platinum	Immunity
"Closer to You"	2019	—	—	—	—	—	—	—	—	—	—		Immunity
"Sofia"	2019	98	8	99	45	85	45	36	125	75	102	RIAA: 2× Platinum; AFP: Gold; ARIA: Gold; BPI: Gold; MC: 2× Platinum; RMNZ: Platinum	Immunity
"I Don't Think I Can Do This Again" (with Mura Masa)	2019	—	—	—	— (Note: "I Don't Think I Can Do This Again" did not enter the Flanders Ultratop 50, but charted as an "extra tip" on the Ultratip chart.)	—	—	—	—	—	—		R.Y.C.
"Blouse"	2021	—	32	—	—	—	—	36	—	—	—		Sling
"For Now" (Note: "For Now" was released on Bandcamp as a charity single.)	2023	—	—	—	—	—	—	—	—	—	—		Non-album singles
"Lavender" (Note: "Lavender" was released on Bandcamp as a charity single.)	2023	—	—	—	—	—	—	—	—	—	—		Non-album singles
"Sexy to Someone"	2024	—	27	—	—	—	—	10	—	—	—	RIAA: Gold; RMNZ: Gold	Charm
"Nomad"	2024	—	46	—	—	—	—	25	—	—	—		Charm
"Juna"	2024	—	–	—	—	—	—	−	—	—	—	RIAA: Gold; ARIA: Gold; BPI: Silver; RMNZ: Platinum	Charm
"Love Songs" (Margo Guryan cover)	2024	—	—	—	—	—	—	—	—	—	—		Like Someone I Know: A Celebration of Margo Guryan
"—" denotes a recording that did not chart or was not released in that territory.

=== As featured artist ===
List of singles, with year released, selected chart positions, certifications, and album name shown
Year	Title	Peak chart positions										Certifications	Album
Year	Title	US Bub.	US AAA	US Rock	AUS Hit.	CAN Rock	IRL	LTU	MEX Ing.	NZ Hot	UK	Certifications	Album
"Thinking Abt U" (Noah Burke featuring Claire Cottrill)	2015	—	—	—	—	—	—	—	—	—	—		Non-album single
"Queen" (PHF featuring Clairo)	2016	—	—	—	—	—	—	—	—	—	—		9MM
"How Was Your Day?" (Mellow Fellow featuring Clairo)	2017	—	—	—	—	—	—	—	—	—	—		Jazzie Robinson
"Girl" (Brennan Henderson featuring Clairo)	2017	—	—	—	—	—	—	—	—	—	—		Never Been Cool
"You Might Be Sleeping" (Jakob featuring Clairo)	2017	—	—	—	—	—	—	—	—	—	—		Bedroom Tapes
"Froyo" (.hans. featuring Clairo)	2017	—	—	—	—	—	—	—	—	—	—		Non-album single
"Midnight" (Maxwell Young featuring Clairo)	2018	—	—	—	—	—	—	—	—	—	—		Daydreamer
"Conducta" (Osquello featuring Nofunbuster and Clairo)	2018	—	—	—	—	—	—	—	—	—	—		Non-album single
"Blue Angel" (Danny L Harle featuring Clairo)	2018	—	—	—	—	—	—	—	—	—	—		PC Music Volume 3
"Where Do We Go from Here?" (Matt & Kim featuring Clairo, Kevin Morby and Fletcher C. Johnson)	2018	—	—	—	—	—	—	—	—	—	—		Almost Everyday
"Sum1 Else" (forgetmenot featuring Clairo)	2018	—	—	—	—	—	—	—	—	—	—		Non-album single
"Are You Bored Yet?" (Wallows featuring Clairo)	2019	12	16	10	8	37	59	82	15	—	65	RIAA: 4× Platinum; AFP: Gold; ARIA: Platinum; BPI: Platinum; MC: 3× Platinum; RMNZ: 2× Platinum	Nothing Happens
"February 2017" (Charli XCX featuring Clairo and Yaeji)	2019	—	—	—	—	—	—	—	—	40	—		Charli
"Racecar" (Deaton Chris Anthony featuring Clairo and Coco & Clair Clair)	2019	—	—	—	—	—	—	—	—	—	—		BO Y
"After Midnight" (Phoenix featuring Clairo)	2023	—	26	— (Note: "After Midnight" did not chart on the Hot Rock & Alternative Songs chart but did peak at number 32 on the Alternative Airplay chart.)	—	—	—	—	—	—	—		Non-album singles
"Glue Song" (Beabadoobee featuring Clairo)	2023	—	—	—	—	—	—	—	—	—	—	RIAA: Gold; BPI: Silver	Non-album singles
"In Love with a Memory" (Sasami featuring Clairo)	2025	—	—	—	—	—	—	—	—	—	—		Blood on the Silver Screen
"—" denotes a recording that did not chart or was not released in that territory.

== Other charted and certified songs ==
Title	Year	Peak chart positions					Certifications	Album/EP
Title	Year	US Bub.	US AAA	US Rock	JPN Over.	NZ Hot	Certifications	Album/EP
"Hello?" (featuring Rejjie Snow)	2018	—	—	—	—	—	RIAA: Platinum; RMNZ: Gold	Diary 001
"How"	2018	—	—	—	—	—	RIAA: Gold	Diary 001
"Alewife"	2019	—	—	—	—	38		Immunity
"Softly"	2019	—	—	47	—	25	RIAA: Gold; RMNZ: Gold	Immunity
"Amoeba"	2021	—	29	32	—	39	RIAA: Gold; BPI: Silver; RMNZ: Gold	Sling
"Second Nature"	2024	—	—	—	—	20		Charm
"Add Up My Love"	2024	—	—	38	17	11		Charm
"—" denotes a recording that did not chart or was not released in that territory.

== Guest appearances ==
Title	Year	Other artists	Album
"Green Eyes"	2021	Arlo Parks	Collapsed in Sunbeams
"The Path"	2021	Lorde	Solar Power
"Solar Power"	2021	Lorde	Solar Power
"Stoned at the Nail Salon"	2021	Lorde	Solar Power
"Fallen Fruit"	2021	Lorde	Solar Power
"Leader of a New Regime"	2021	Lorde	Solar Power
"Mood Ring"	2021	Lorde	Solar Power
"So Low"	2023	Synthia	Non-album single
"Alma Mater"	2023	Bleachers, Lana Del Rey	Bleachers
"Gone in Seconds"	2023	Del Water Gap	I Miss You Already + I Haven’t Left Yet
"Many Ways"	2024	Clarity	Transa
"Mr. Eclectic"	2025	Laufey	A Matter of Time

== Music videos ==
Title	Year	Director(s)	Ref.
As lead artist
"Pretty Girl"	2017	Clairo	
"4Ever"	2018	Clairo	
"Better"	2018	Weird Life Films	
"Heaven"	2018	Crystal Moselle	
"Juna"	2024	Bradley J. Calder	
As featured artist
"Are You Bored Yet?"	2019	Drew Kirsch	
"I Don't Think I Can Do This Again"	2019	Thomas Hardiman	
"Racecar"	2019	Jeffrey Schroeder	
Cameo appearances
"On Me" (Mulherin featuring Dijon)	2020	Michael Rees	
