= Geoff Cottrill =

American marketer

Geoffrey Cottrill (born July 4, 1963) is an American marketer who most recently served as chief brand & games officer at Topgolf. He formerly held top positions at Procter & Gamble, Coca-Cola, Starbucks, and Converse. He is the father of the musical artist Clairo.

== Career ==
Cottrill was chief brand & games officer at American sports entertainment brand Topgolf until he retired from the position in March 2025. He is also the co-founder of MARVIN. Cottrill was also a vice president at record label Hear Music, which is a collaboration between coffeehouse chain Starbucks and Concord Music Group, in Seattle, Washington. Between 2007 and 2016, he was chief marketing officer of Converse, a subsidiary of Nike, Inc. In 2014, he was appointed vice-chair of the Grammy Foundation, a non-voting philanthropic organization dedicated to raising money for music preservation and music education. The organization created the Music Educator of the Year Award. Between 2015 and 2017, he was president of American operations at MullenLowe Group.

In 2010, he was named one of Brandweek's "Marketers of the Year".

== Personal life ==
Cottrill resides in Atlanta, Georgia, and on Cape Cod with his wife, professional children's fashion photographer Allison Cottrill. Cottrill is the father of the musical artist Clairo. According to The New York Times, her record label signing was made possible by her father's connection to Jon Cohen, co-founder of The Fader and an executive at the publication's marketing agency, Cornerstone. His role in the launching of his daughter's professional career attracted scrutiny from some online communities with regard to the singer's authenticity.
