= Charm Tour =

2024–25 concert tour by Clairo

- Tour by Clairo
- Location: Europe; North America; Oceania
- Associated album: Charm
- Start date: September 6, 2024
- End date: March 20, 2025
- Legs: 3
- No. of shows: 58
- Supporting acts: Alice Phoebe Lou; Frankie Cosmos; June McDoom; Paris Texas

Clairo concert chronology
- Sling Tour (2022–2023); Charm Tour (2024–2025)

The Charm Tour was the fourth concert tour by American singer-songwriter Clairo in support of her third studio album, Charm (2024). It began on September 6, 2024, in Los Angeles, with shows across North America and Europe, and concluded in Manchester on March 20, 2025, comprising 58 shows. Paris, Texas, Frankie Cosmos, Alice Phoebe Lou and June McDoom served as the opening acts.

== Background ==
On July 17, 2024, Clairo formally announced the tour, with 36 shows across North America from September through November 2024. Tickets went on sale on July 26, with a presale that ran from July 23 until July 25. On August 5, 2024, Clairo announced European dates for the tour, with 10 shows scheduled for March 2025. Tickets went on sale on August 9, with a presale that ran from August 7 until August 8.

== Set list ==
This set list is representative of the first show in Los Angeles. It does not represent all dates throughout the tour.

1. "Nomad"
2. "Second Nature"
3. "Thank You"
4. "Softly"
5. "Flaming Hot Cheetos"
6. "How"
7. "Bambi"
8. "Terrapin"
9. "Add Up My Love"
10. "North"
11. "Echo"
12. "Glory of the Snow"
13. "Slow Dance"
14. "Partridge"
15. "Pier 4"
16. "4EVER"
17. "Amoeba"
18. "Bags"
19. "Sexy to Someone"
20. "Juna"

== Tour dates ==
List of 2024 concerts, showing date, city, country, venue, opening acts
Date (2024)	City	Country	Venue	Opening act
September 6	Los Angeles	United States	The Fonda Theatre	Paris Texas
September 7	Los Angeles	United States	The Fonda Theatre	Paris Texas
September 8	Los Angeles	United States	The Fonda Theatre	Paris Texas
September 10	Los Angeles	United States	The Fonda Theatre	Paris Texas
September 11	Los Angeles	United States	The Fonda Theatre	Paris Texas
September 14	New York City	United States	Webster Hall	Frankie Cosmos
September 15	New York City	United States	Webster Hall	Frankie Cosmos
September 17	New York City	United States	Webster Hall	Frankie Cosmos
September 18	New York City	United States	Webster Hall	Frankie Cosmos
September 19	New York City	United States	Webster Hall	Frankie Cosmos
September 27	Dallas	United States	The Factory in Deep Ellum	Alice Phoebe Lou
September 28	Houston	United States	White Oak Music Hall	Alice Phoebe Lou
September 30	Austin	United States	Moody Theater	Alice Phoebe Lou
October 1	Austin	United States	Moody Theater	Alice Phoebe Lou
October 3	Mesa	United States	Mesa Amphitheatre	Alice Phoebe Lou
October 4	San Diego	United States	The Rady Shell at Jacobs Park	Alice Phoebe Lou
October 6	Stanford	United States	Frost Amphitheater	Alice Phoebe Lou
October 7	Santa Barbara	United States	Santa Barbara Bowl	Alice Phoebe Lou
October 9	Portland	United States	McMenamins Edgefield	Alice Phoebe Lou
October 10	Seattle	United States	Paramount Theatre	Alice Phoebe Lou
October 11	Seattle	United States	Paramount Theatre	Alice Phoebe Lou
October 13	Magna	United States	The Great Saltair	Alice Phoebe Lou
October 14	Denver	United States	Mission Ballroom	Alice Phoebe Lou
October 16	Chicago	United States	The Salt Shed	Alice Phoebe Lou
October 17	Chicago	United States	The Salt Shed	Alice Phoebe Lou
October 20	Columbus	United States	KEMBA Live!	Alice Phoebe Lou
October 21	Washington, D.C.	United States	The Anthem	Alice Phoebe Lou
October 28	Boston	United States	Roadrunner	Alice Phoebe Lou
October 29	Boston	United States	Roadrunner	Alice Phoebe Lou
October 30	Boston	United States	Roadrunner	Alice Phoebe Lou
November 1	Philadelphia	United States	Franklin Music Hall	Alice Phoebe Lou
November 2	Philadelphia	United States	Franklin Music Hall	Alice Phoebe Lou
November 4	Nashville	United States	Grand Ole Opry House	Alice Phoebe Lou
November 5	Charlotte	United States	Ovens Auditorium	Alice Phoebe Lou
November 7	Atlanta	United States	Fox Theatre	Alice Phoebe Lou
November 8	Atlanta	United States	Fox Theatre	Alice Phoebe Lou
November 15 (Note: This concert is part of Corona Capital.)	Mexico City	Mexico	Autódromo Hermanos Rodríguez	—N/a
December 16 (Note: The concerts on December 16, 17 and 18, 2024, at Massey Hall in Toronto were originally scheduled to take place on October 23, 24 and 25, 2024, but were rescheduled due to extreme exhaustion.)	Toronto	Canada	Massey Hall	Alice Phoebe Lou
December 17	Toronto	Canada	Massey Hall	Alice Phoebe Lou
December 18	Toronto	Canada	Massey Hall	Alice Phoebe Lou

List of 2025 concerts, showing date, city, country, venue, opening acts
Date (2025)	City	Country	Venue	Opening act
February 6 (Note: This concert is part of Laneway Festival.)	Auckland	New Zealand	Western Springs Stadium	—N/a
February 8 (Note: This concert is part of Laneway Festival.)	Brisbane	Australia	Brisbane Showgrounds	—N/a
February 9 (Note: This concert is part of Laneway Festival.)	Sydney	Australia	Centennial Parklands	—N/a
February 14 (Note: This concert is part of Laneway Festival.)	Melbourne	Australia	Flemington Racecourse	—N/a
February 15 (Note: This concert is part of Laneway Festival.)	Adelaide	Australia	Bonython Park	—N/a
February 16 (Note: This concert is part of Laneway Festival.)	Perth	Australia	Wellington Square	—N/a
March 3	Dublin	Ireland	3Olympia Theatre	June McDoom
March 4	Dublin	Ireland	3Olympia Theatre	June McDoom
March 7	Paris	France	Salle Pleyel	June McDoom
March 8	Paris	France	Salle Pleyel	June McDoom
March 10	Utrecht	Netherlands	TivoliVredenburg	June McDoom
March 11	Utrecht	Netherlands	TivoliVredenburg	June McDoom
March 13	London	England	Eventim Apollo	June McDoom
March 14	London	England	Eventim Apollo	June McDoom
March 16	Glasgow	Scotland	O_{2} Academy Glasgow	June McDoom
March 17	Glasgow	Scotland	O_{2} Academy Glasgow	June McDoom
March 19	Manchester	England	O_{2} Apollo Manchester	June McDoom
March 20	Manchester	England	O_{2} Apollo Manchester	June McDoom
