= Clairo =

American singer–songwriter (born 1998)

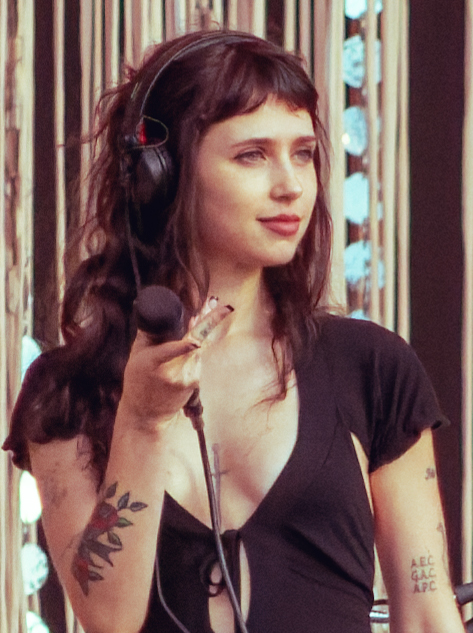
- Clairo performing in 2025

Background information
- Also known as: DJ Baby Benz
- Born: Claire Elizabeth Cottrill; August 18, 1998 (age 28); Atlanta, Georgia, U.S.
- Origin: Carlisle, Massachusetts, U.S
- Genres: Bedroom pop; lo-fi; indie pop; indie rock; alternative pop; soft rock
- Occupation: Singer-songwriter
- Instruments: Vocals; guitar; keyboards
- Works: Discography
- Years active: 2012–present
- Labels: Clairo; Fader; Republic; Atlantic
- Father: Geoff Cottrill
- Website: clairo.com

Claire Elizabeth Cottrill (born August 18, 1998), known professionally as Clairo, is an American singer–songwriter.

Clairo began posting music on the internet at age 13 but rose to prominence following her viral video for her lo-fi single "Pretty Girl" in 2017. She then signed a recording contract with Fader Label and released her debut EP Diary 001 (2018). Her debut studio album, Immunity (2019), includes the singles "Bags" and "Sofia", the latter of which was her first single to chart on the Billboard Hot 100. Cottrill's second studio album, Sling (2021) debuted in the top 20 of the US Billboard 200. Her third studio album, Charm (2024), was self-released and received a 2025 Grammy nomination for Best Alternative Music Album.

== Biography ==
=== Early life and education ===
Claire Elizabeth Cottrill was born on August 18, 1998, in Atlanta. She is the daughter of Geoff Cottrill, a marketing executive who has worked for Procter & Gamble, Coca-Cola, Starbucks, Converse, and TopGolf, and Allison 'Allie' Cottrill, a children's fashion photographer and designer. Her father's industry connections—he served as one of the founding executives of a recording studio in Brooklyn and secured her first recording contract—have sparked allegations that Clairo is a "nepo baby" or an "industry plant". She has a sister, Abby Cottrill.

She and her family lived in Atlanta until she was seven years old, whereupon they moved to Washington state for three years before settling in Carlisle, Massachusetts. She attended middle school in Carlisle and subsequently attended Concord-Carlisle High School in Concord, Massachusetts, graduating in 2017.

In 2017, Clairo enrolled in the Bandier Program for Recording and Entertainment Industries at Syracuse University; however, she dropped out after one year so she could pursue music full time. Bandier Program director Bill Werde encouraged Clairo to take time off, calling it a "rare opportunity."

=== Career ===
==== 2011–2016: Early career ====
When Clairo was 13 years old, she began learning to play guitar, first by way of formal lessons, but largely via tutorials on YouTube, copying hand movements. Clairo began recording cover versions on her laptop that year, beginning with a cover version of a Maroon 5 song. She recalled of this first recording,

"It took me hours to figure out if I wanted to post it on Facebook or not to even tell my friends that I'd made it. I was so nervous about it! I just closed my eyes and did it, and then I closed my computer and tried not to think about it".

In her teens, MTV contacted her to record background music for an MTV television show, but the song never aired. She has posted music to Bandcamp under the monikers Clairo and DJ Baby Benz. She has also posted cover versions, songs, and DJ mixes of rap music on SoundCloud. Clairo uploaded three short films on a different YouTube channel and maintained a second channel for cover versions and short films.

She launched her EP Do U Wanna Fall in Love? in 2013 after releasing several home recordings. In 2015, she released more EPs of 3 or 4 songs each on Bandcamp: Aquarius Boy, Late Show, Moth Girl, Metal Heart, and Have a Nice Day.

==== 2017–2018: Diary 001 ====
"Pretty Girl" (2017)
Clairo's bedroom pop beginnings in "Pretty Girl" (2017).

In 2017, while studying at Syracuse University, Clairo built a following in the bedroom pop scene through collaborations with other independent artists, featuring on Mellow Fellow's single "How Was Your Day?" and Jakob Ogawa's track "You Might Be Sleeping." She first drew wide attention later that year when the video for her song "Pretty Girl" went viral on YouTube. The song was recorded for an indie rock compilation benefiting the Transgender Law Center. According to her, she recorded the track "using the resources around me which were pretty shitty. I used like a little keyboard that I had and I was really into '80s pop music-my mom is obsessed with it-so it kind of inspired me to do something like that." She attributes audience interest in the video to YouTube's algorithm. Her music was categorized under the growing genre of bedroom pop, and her videos became popular on vaporwave-centric Facebook groups.

Another video, "Flaming Hot Cheetos", garnered 3 million views by July 2018.

The success of "Pretty Girl" led to interest from major labels such as Capitol, RCA, and Columbia. Her father knew Jon Cohen, the co-founder of The Fader, and he facilitated a recording contract for Clairo, who signed to FADER Label and was introduced to Pat Corcoran, manager of Chance the Rapper. She became a client of talent agency Haight Brand near the end of 2017. Clairo has acknowledged her social privilege via her father's industry connections.

In May 2018, FADER released Clairo's debut record, diary 001. In her review for Pitchfork, Fader contributor Sasha Geffen wrote that the EP ought to subside the "legions of naysayers who dismissed her as a one-hit fluke or an industry plant." Joe Coscarelli of The New York Times said that the EP "bridges both worlds, building on the coy, understated bedroom pop of 'Pretty Girl' and 'Flaming Hot Cheetos' toward sturdier numbers like '4EVER' and 'B.O.M.D.'" Also in May 2018, Clairo announced a headlining tour in North America, as well as select shows as a supporting act for Dua Lipa's Self-Titled Tour. Her July 2018 performance at the Bowery Ballroom in New York City was a sold-out show. She performed at Lollapalooza in August 2018 and at the Coachella Valley Music and Arts Festival in 2019.

==== 2019–2020: Immunity ====
"Bags" (2019)
Clairo's advancement into indie pop in "Bags" (2019).

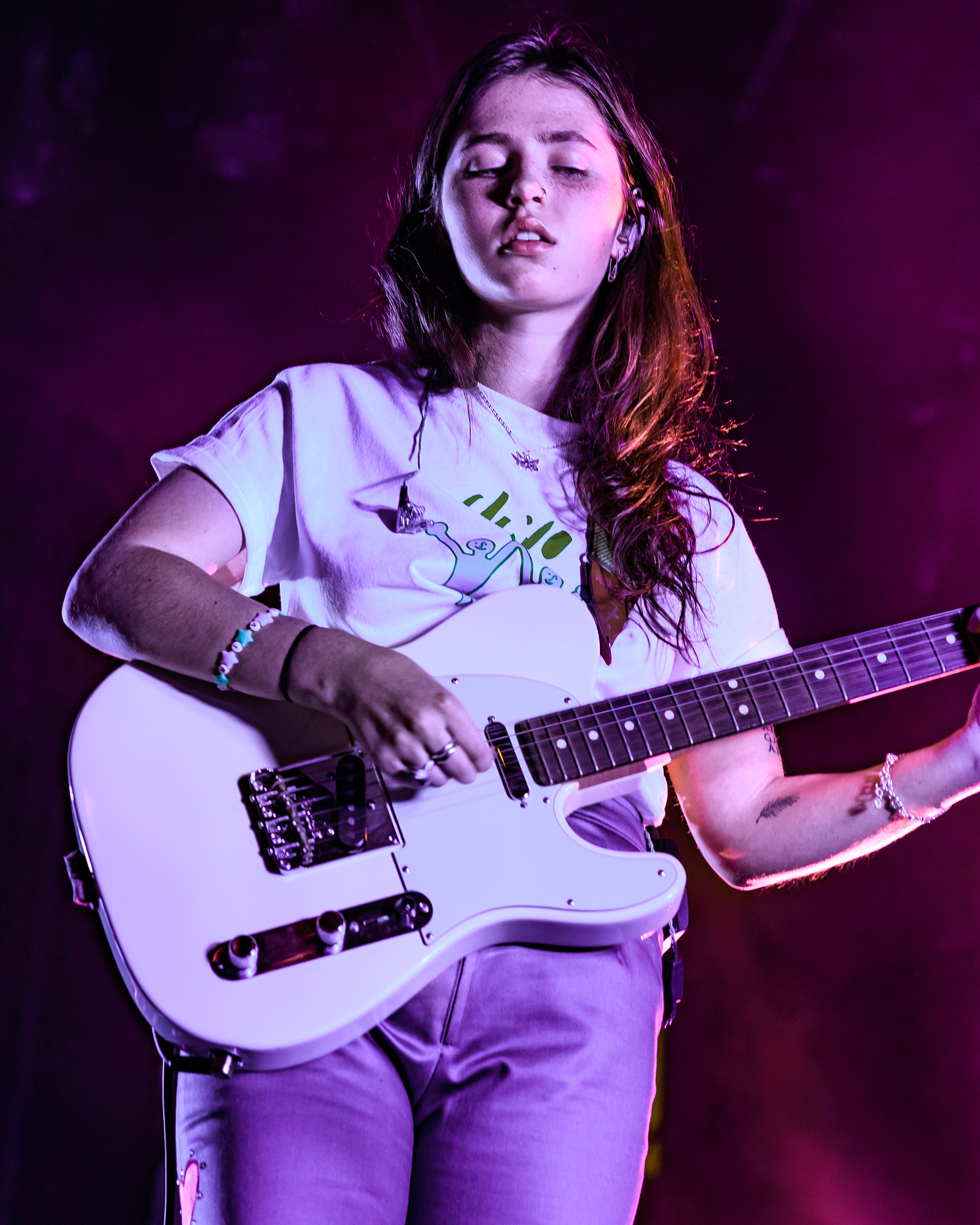
Clairo performing live at the El Rey Theatre in Los Angeles, April 2019

In May 2019, Clairo released "Bags" and announced her debut studio album Immunity, which was released in August 2019. She released two more singles from the album, "Closer to You" and "Sofia". Following the Immunity's commercial success, Apple Music named Clairo an Apple Music Up Next artist in August 2019.

Clairo made her television debut performing "I Wouldn't Ask You" on Jimmy Kimmel Live! in September 2019 and "Bags" on The Ellen DeGeneres Show a few days later.

In December 2019, she won Pop Artist of the Year at the Boston Music Awards for the second consecutive year, as well as Album of the Year for Immunity. "Bags" was included in over 15 critics' lists ranking the year's top songs including Pitchfork's and Paste's lists of best songs of the decade. Immunity was included in over 10 "Best of 2019" lists, including those of The Guardian (20th), Pitchfork (18th), Billboard (22nd), and the Los Angeles Times (5th). During the tour to support the album, Clairo was so stressed that her hair began to fall out and she lost a significant amount of weight, eating only two small portions a day.

Since 2019, Clairo has been managed by Mike Ahern and Jimmy Bui.

==== 2020–2023: Sling ====
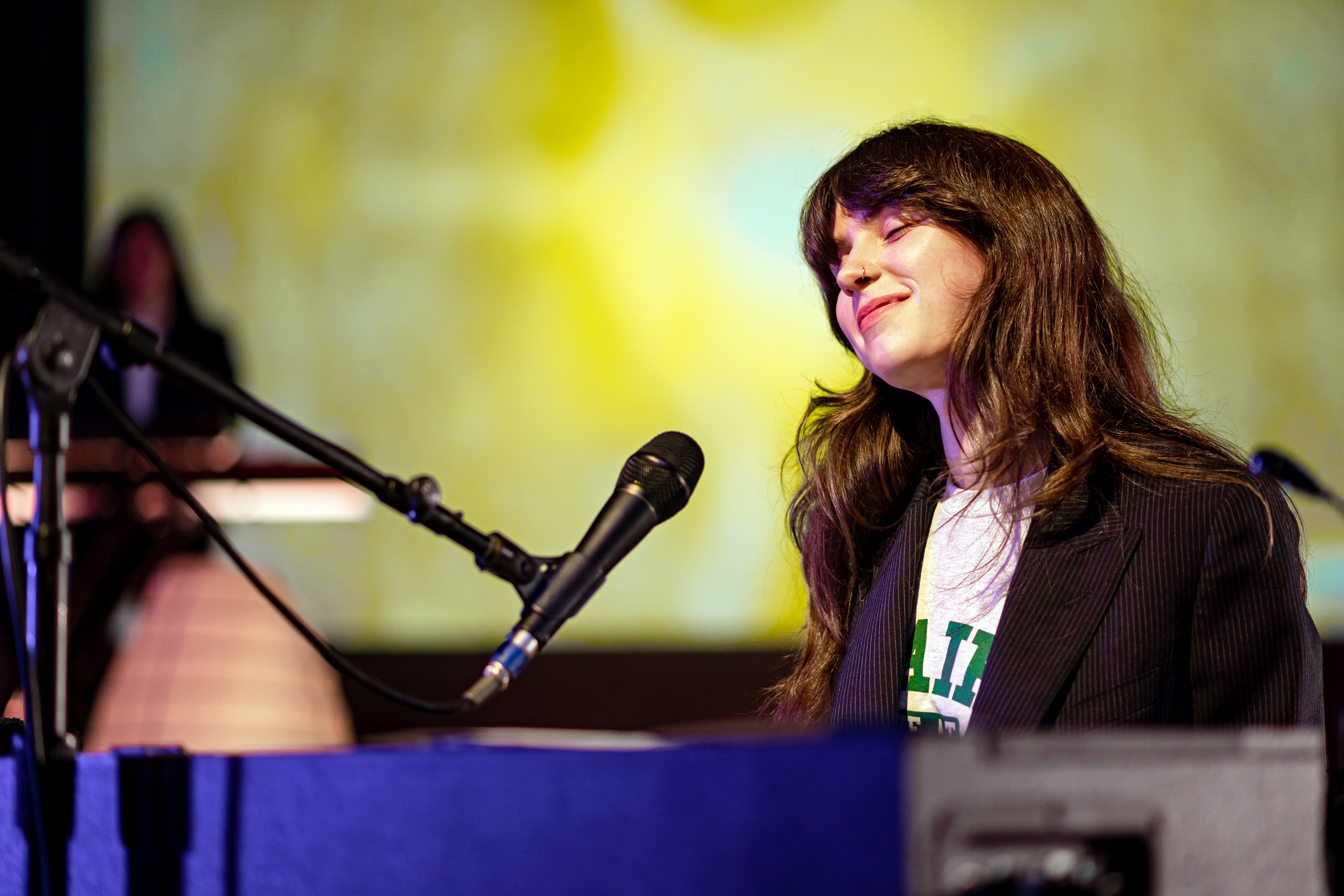
Clairo performing at the Greek Theatre in Los Angeles, California, in 2022

During the COVID-19 lockdowns, Clairo moved in with her family in Atlanta.

In October 2020, she formed a new band called Shelly with indie pop artist Claud and their two friends from Syracuse University, Josh Mehling and Noa Frances Getzug. The group released two songs, "Steeeam" and "Natural", in October 2020.

In June 2021, Clairo debuted "Blouse", the first single from her second studio album, Sling. The album was released in July 2021, co-produced by Jack Antonoff, and was praised for Clairo's artistic progression and thematic songwriting as it pondered future motherhood, domesticity, and the responsibility of becoming a caregiver. It appeared on "Best albums of 2021" lists by The Guardian (29th), NME (14th), and Stereogum (19th). The cover of the album features a dog that Clairo adopted in December 2020.

In February 2022, Clairo embarked on the US leg of the Sling tour. She canceled the last three dates of her North American tour after a technical error at her gig in Toronto, whereby her in-ear monitors became unbearably loud and left her with temporary hearing damage. After two songs, her opening show of the UK tour in Bristol had to be canceled due to a case of sinusitis that was affecting her voice, leading to her having a panic attack onstage and leaving afterward. The Glasgow show was canceled but the show the day after it in Manchester went ahead, and her final UK show of that tour was in London.

In 2023, Clairo was an opening act for Boygenius during the inaugural Re:SET Concert Series. In May 2023, after featuring on remixes by Phoenix and Beabadoobee, she released the EP Live at Electric Lady, containing new versions of songs from her first two albums. She also released two charity singles on Bandcamp: "For Now," with all proceeds directed to Everytown for Gun Safety and For the Gworls; and "Lavender", to raise funds for Doctors Without Borders during the ongoing Gazan war.

==== 2024–present: Charm ====
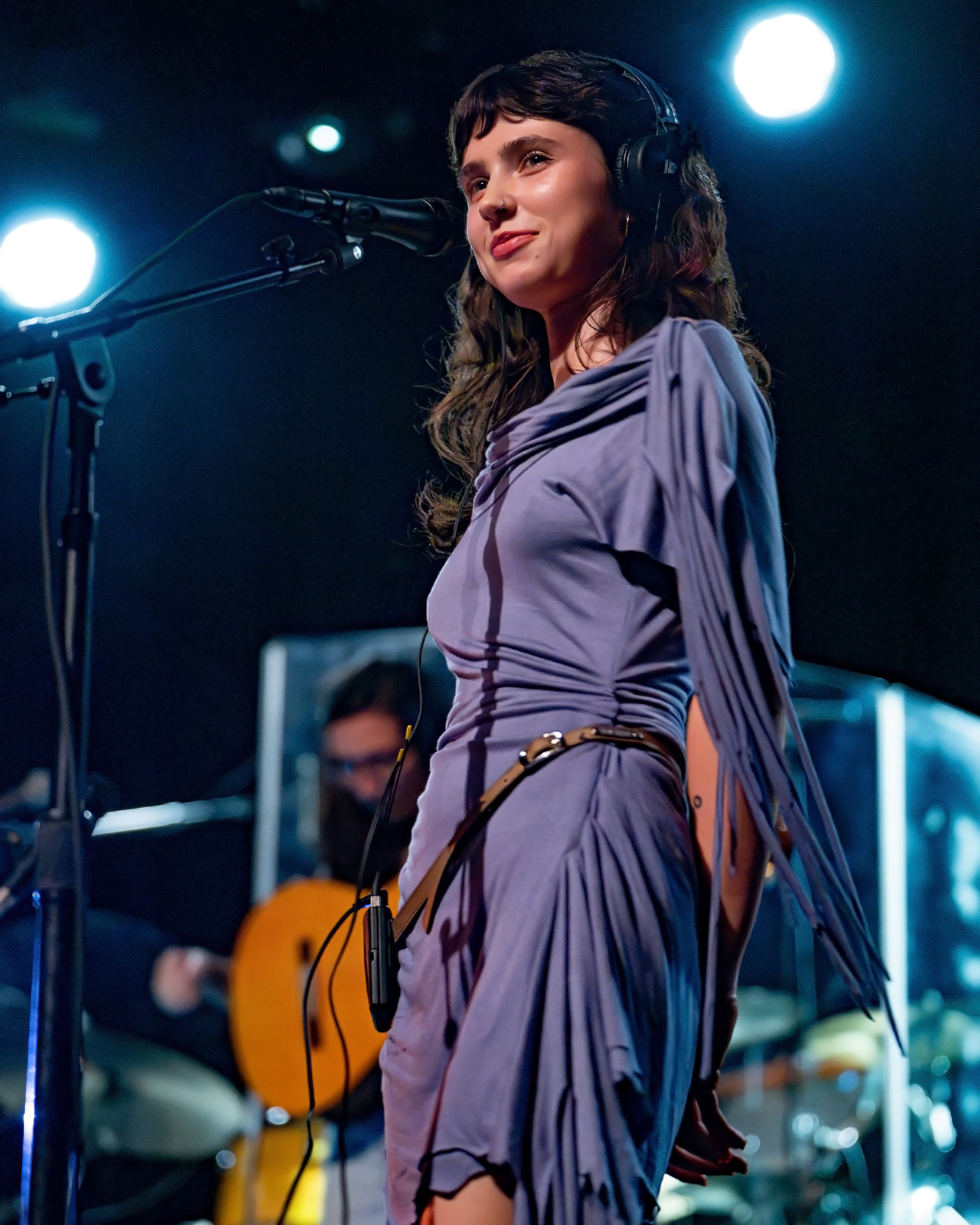
Clairo performing at the Fonda Theatre in Los Angeles for the Charm residencies, September 2024

In May 2024, Clairo announced her third album, titled Charm, which she co-produced with Leon Michels, and released its lead single, "Sexy to Someone". She also announced two residencies to support the album in New York City and Los Angeles in September 2024. In June 2024, "Nomad" was released as the record's second and last single.

Charm was released in July 2024 to critical acclaim, with music critics highlighting the record's jazz-like production, songwriting, and Clairo's overall musical expansion. Also in July 2024, Clairo performed "Juna", the seventh track on Charm, live at The Tonight Show Starring Jimmy Fallon. On the same day, she announced the dates of her 2024 North American tour spanning between September and November, featuring Alice Phoebe Lou as the opening act.

In August 2024, the music video for "Juna" was released. It marked Clairo's first music video in six years, and is wrestling-themed. She also released a cover version of Lana Del Rey's "Brooklyn Baby" exclusively on Spotify as part of the Spotify Singles series. In October 2024, Clairo released a cover version of Margo Guryan's "Love Songs". The cover song is a part of the Guryan tribute compilation album Like Someone I Know, released in November 2024.

Charm was nominated in the Best Alternative Music Album category of the 67th Annual Grammy Awards. This marked Clairo's first Grammy nomination.

In December 2024, Clairo shared the music video for "Sexy to Someone". That month, she was named to the music category of Forbes's 30 Under 30 list. In February 2025, she released a music video for "Terrapin". It was directed by actress Ayo Edebiri, and features "Weird Al" Yankovic as "Clairo". In July 2025, her band Shelly released Shelly 2, a double single which contains the songs "Cross Your Mind" and "Hartwell". This marked the group's first release since 2020's "Steeeam" and "Natural".

In September 2025, Clairo signed with Atlantic Records. She remixed the song "You Got Time and I Got Money" on the November 2025 Smerz remix album Big City Life Edits, featured on "Hardy" from the May 2026 Rostam album American Stories, and featured on multiple songs from the June 2026 Ryan Beatty album Sweet Fortune.

== Influences ==
Clairo recalled that the Shins' Wincing the Night Away (2007) was the first album she "really completely geeked out over", crediting it as her inspiration to make music. Since many around her told her that a career in music was unlikely, she did not consider it a prospect and therefore did "whatever" she wanted musically. She said that her musical influences were a mixture of her mother and father's musical tastes, citing artists including Al Green, Brenton Wood, Billy Paul, Cocteau Twins, Trashcan Sinatras, the The, and Public Image Ltd.

== Artistry ==
Clairo's musical style has been variously labeled as pop, soft rock, lo-fi, indie rock, indie pop, and bedroom pop.

== Activism ==
In July 2020, Clairo signed an open letter to then-UK Equalities minister Liz Truss calling for a ban on all forms of LGBT+ conversion therapy.

In May 2022, Clairo was one of 160 artists that signed a full-page ad in The New York Times condemning the planned overturn by the United States Supreme Court of abortion rights established in Roe v. Wade.

While performing at Glastonbury Festival 2022, Clairo wore a T-shirt saying "Bans Off Our Bodies" in protest of the Dobbs v. Jackson Women's Health Organization decision, which overturned access to abortion granted in Roe v. Wade.

In October 2023, Clairo signed the Artists4Ceasefire open letter to President Joe Biden calling for a ceasefire in the Gaza war. In January and July 2024, she performed at the Artists for Aid Benefit Concert in London, which raised funds for the Gaza Strip and Sudan. In October 2025, Clairo joined the "No Music For Genocide" movement, removing her music from streaming services in Israel.

In April 2025, Clairo was introduced at Coachella by U.S. Senator Bernie Sanders and U.S. Representative Maxwell Frost, the first member of Congress from Generation Z. Sanders said he introduced Clairo because she "used her prominence to fight for women’s rights, to try to end the terrible, brutal war in Gaza". This was a stop on Sanders's Fighting Oligarchy Tour against U.S. President Donald Trump.

In July 2026, she released the charity single "Losing Pride", with proceeds donated to the climate change activism organization Zero Hour.

== Personal life ==
Clairo came out as bisexual to her fans via Twitter in May 2018. In an interview, she said that making friends in college helped her to come out, as her friends were openly gay and she was inspired by "their confidence and their willingness to be exposed." In a 2025 interview, Clairo stated that she is queer, mentioning that "I don't care for labels at all. I believe people should like who they want and no one should have a problem with it. I'll kiss anyone."

Clairo was diagnosed with juvenile idiopathic arthritis at the age of 17. She also has depression and anxiety and has cancelled meet and greets with fans to focus on her mental health.

Clairo lives in upstate New York on a five-acre property in the countryside between the Berkshires and the Catskill Mountains. She also rents an apartment in Bushwick, Brooklyn. She has said that she finds inspiration for her songs by living near nature.

== Discography ==
Studio albums

- Immunity (2019)
- Sling (2021)
- Charm (2024)

== Band members ==
Clairo's band members are:

- Eddie Burns - drums
- Hayley Briasco - guitar
- Danae Greenfield - keys
- Dejon Crockran - bass
- Hailey Niswager - "everything else"

== Live performances ==
=== Headlining tours ===
- Lazy Days Tour (2018)
- Immunity Tour (2019)
- Sling Tour (2022–2023)
- Charm Tour (2024–2025)

== Awards and nominations ==
Name of the award ceremony, year presented, nominee(s) of the award, award category, and the result of the nomination
| Award ceremony | Year | Category | Nominee(s)/work(s) | Result | Ref. |
|---|---|---|---|---|---|
| BBC Radio 1 | 2019 | Hottest Record of the Year | "Bags" | 5th | |
| Boston Music Awards | 2018 | Artist of the Year | Clairo | Nominated | |
| Boston Music Awards | 2018 | Pop Artist of the Year | Clairo | Won | |
| Boston Music Awards | 2018 | Album/EP of the Year | Diary 001 | Nominated | |
| Boston Music Awards | 2019 | Artist of the Year | Clairo | Nominated | |
| Boston Music Awards | 2019 | Pop Artist of the Year | Clairo | Won | |
| Boston Music Awards | 2019 | Album of the Year | Immunity | Won | |
| Boston Music Awards | 2019 | Song of the Year | "Bags" | Nominated | |
| Grammy Awards | 2025 | Best Alternative Music Album | Charm | Nominated | |
| iHeartRadio Music Awards | 2022 | Best New Alternative Artist | Clairo | Nominated | |
| NME Awards | 2020 | Best Song in the World | "Bags" | Nominated | |
| NME Awards | 2020 | Best New Act in the World | Clairo | Won | |
| UK Music Video Awards | 2025 | Best Alternative Video – International | "Juna" | Nominated | |
