= Charm (Clairo album) =

Studio album by Clairo
- Released: July 12, 2024
- Studio: Allaire (Shokan, New York); Diamond Mine Recording (Queens, New York City)
- Genre: Pop; soft rock; psychedelia; indie rock
- Length: 38:02
- Label: Clairo
- Producer: Claire Cottrill; Leon Michels

Clairo chronology
Sling (2021)	Charm (2024)

Singles from Charm
- 1. "Sexy to Someone" Released: May 23, 2024; 2. "Nomad" Released: June 28, 2024; 3. "Juna" Released: July 12, 2024; 4. "Add Up My Love" Released: November 1, 2024; 5. "Terrapin" Released: February 6, 2025

Charm is the third studio album by American singer-songwriter Clairo, released on July 12, 2024. The follow-up to her second album, Sling (2021), it is her first self-released studio album after her previous two albums were released by Fader and Republic respectively.

Clairo produced the album alongside Leon Michels, with musical contributions from Nick Movshon, Homer Steinweiss, Marco Benevento, and Dave Guy, among others. To promote it, she released the singles "Sexy to Someone", "Nomad", "Juna" and "Terrapin" — latter two being promotional — played two residencies at the Fonda Theatre and the Webster Hall, and embarked on the Charm Tour.

Charm received critical acclaim, with music critics praising its production, songwriting and Clairo's musical expansion. Commercially, it debuted at number 8 on the US Billboard 200, becoming her first top 10 album. At the 67th Annual Grammy Awards, it was nominated for Best Alternative Music Album, marking Clairo's first Grammy nomination.

== Background ==
Clairo released Sling, her second album, on July 16, 2021. It was received positively by music critics, and appeared on numerous "best albums of 2021" lists. Critics praised it for Clairo's artistic progression and thematic songwriting that ponders future motherhood, domesticity, and the responsibility of becoming a caregiver. In 2022, to support the record, Clairo embarked on the Sling tour. During the tour, she suffered from sinus infections and an ear injury, before finishing it on October 4, 2022.

In 2023, aside from collaborating with artists like Phoenix and Beabadoobee, Clairo released two charity singles on Bandcamp, "For Now" with all proceeds directed to Everytown for Gun Safety and for the Gworls, and "Lavender" to raise funds for Doctors Without Borders during the Gaza war. A live EP, Live at Electric Lady, was released on May 12, 2023.

In January 2024, Clairo started teasing a new album with a post on Instagram, captioning it "maybe this year". In March, she shared an Instagram post captioned with emojis depicting the number three, a check mark, and a purple heart. The post was interpreted by music publication The Forty-Five to mean that her third studio album was complete. On May 7, she revealed a release date of May 23 for her new music via Instagram Stories.

On May 23, Clairo announced that the album, titled Charm and produced by Leon Michels, was scheduled for release on July 12, while releasing its lead single, "Sexy to Someone". A press release accompanying the announcement of Charm described the album as "a collection of warm, '70s-inspired grooves that move lithely between jazz, psychedelic folk and soul".

== Recording and production ==
Charm was recorded at Allaire Studios in upstate New York near Woodstock and at Diamond Mine Recording in the New York City borough of Queens. Cottrill previously worked with producer Jack Antonoff on Sling at Allaire Studios. On Charm, production is instead undertaken by Leon Michels who had previously produced for jazz and soul artists such as Norah Jones, Sharon Jones & the Dap-Kings and Liam Bailey. The album was recorded live on analog tape.

== Release and promotion ==
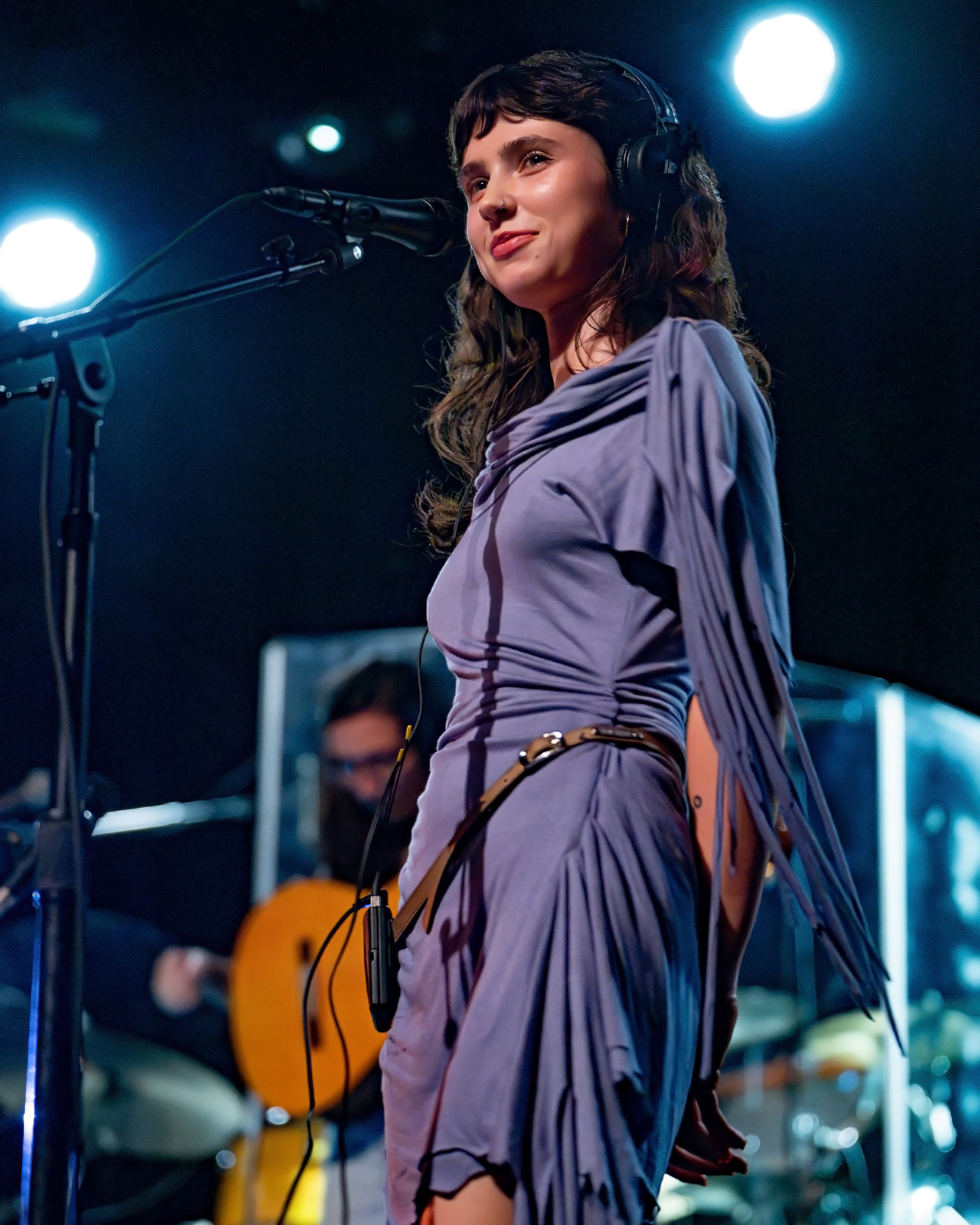
Clairo performing at the Fonda Theatre, September 2024

The first single from Charm to be released was "Sexy to Someone" on May 23, 2024. Uproxx described the track as "flirty" while Rolling Stone said it was "a summer stunner with cozy production and whimsical instrumentation". "Nomad", the record's second single, was released on June 28, 2024.

On May 29, Clairo announced two residencies for September in support of the album. The Los Angeles residency took place at the Fonda Theatre, while the New York residency took place at the Webster Hall.

On July 17, to promote the album, Clairo performed "Juna", the seventh track of the album, live at The Tonight Show Starring Jimmy Fallon. On the same day, she also announced the dates for her upcoming North American tour that was held from September to November 2024. The tour is supported by singer-songwriter Alice Phoebe Lou as the opening act.

On August 4, the music video for "Juna" was released. It marked Clairo's first music video in six years and is wrestling-themed. On December 3, Clairo shared the music video for "Sexy to Someone". A third music video debuted on February 6, 2025, for "Terrapin", directed by Ayo Edebiri and featuring "Weird Al" Yankovic as "Clairo".

== Critical reception ==
Professional ratings
Aggregate scores
Source	Rating
AnyDecentMusic?	7.9/10
Metacritic	82/100
Review scores
Source	Rating
AllMusic	4.5/5 stars
Clash	9/10
The Guardian	4/5 stars
The Line of Best Fit	8/10
NME	4/5 stars
Paste	8.1/10
Pitchfork	7.5/10
Rolling Stone	4/5 stars
The Skinny	3/5 stars
Slant Magazine	4/5 stars

Charm received critical acclaim upon release. At Metacritic, which assigns a normalized rating out of 100 to reviews from mainstream critics, the album received an average score of 82.

Slant Magazine writer Nick Seip described the record's production and instrumentation as "its secret weapon", and favorably compared the voice of Cotrill on the track "Terrapin" to her "early history of singing over lo-fi beats". Marissa Lorusso, for Pitchfork, also noted the album's resemblance to her earlier work, while sentencing that it doesn't have the "dramatic shift" in the manner of the singer's sophomore record, Sling, nor "Immunity's kinship with bedroom pop", yet a "successful but polite soft-rock outing."

The Daily Tar Heel's Alexis Clifton highlighted Charm's "whispery jazz, soft rock elements, groovy orchestral motifs and undeniable warmth", and stated that it is essentially a "falling in love" album which "lies in between" of the themes of its predecessors: Immunity's youth and Sling's "multifacetedness of growing old".

On a more mixed-to-negative review, Paulo Rogasa, writing for Consequence, felt that, although the record does show Cotrill's music maturity, specifically on its "musical arrangements", her "pillow-soft" vocals strip some of its songs "of their emotional exterior", exemplifying it with "Sexy to Someone", a track that, he said, is "devoid of desire" in its delivery.

=== Year-end lists ===
Select year-end rankings for Charm
Publication/critic	Accolade	Rank	Ref.
Coup de Main	The Best Albums Of 2024	1	
Exclaim!	50 Best Albums of 2024	30	
Paste	The 100 Best Albums of 2024	76	
Pitchfork	The 50 Best Albums of 2024	21	
Rough Trade UK	Albums of the Year 2024	16	
Variety	The Best Albums of 2024	7	

== Track listing ==
Charm track listing
No.	Title	Writer(s)	Length
1.	"Nomad"	Claire Cottrill; Leon Michels; Homer Steinweiss; Nick Movshon	3:45
2.	"Sexy to Someone"	Cottrill; Michels; Steinweiss; Movshon	3:27
3.	"Second Nature"	Cottrill; Michels; Steinweiss; Movshon; Dylan Nowik	3:47
4.	"Slow Dance"	Cottrill; Michels; Steinweiss; Movshon; Nowik	3:54
5.	"Thank You"	Cottrill; Michels; Steinweiss; Movshon; Kevin Martin	3:25
6.	"Terrapin"	Cottrill; Michels; Steinweiss; Movshon; Marco Benevento	3:00
7.	"Juna"	Cottrill; Michels; Benevento	3:15
8.	"Add Up My Love"	Cottrill; Michels; Steinweiss; Movshon	3:25
9.	"Echo"	Cottrill; Michels; Nowik; Movshon	3:49
10.	"Glory of the Snow"	Cottrill; Michels	2:50
11.	"Pier 4"	Cottrill; Michels	3:25
Total length:			38:02

== Personnel ==
Musicians

- Claire Cottrill – lead vocals (all tracks), Wurlitzer electric piano (track 1), piano (2, 8, 10), Mellotron (3), flute (4), percussion (5), guitar (9–11)
- Leon Michels – percussion (tracks 1–4, 8–10), flute (1, 2, 4, 5, 8–11), synthesizer (1, 2, 5–10), guitar (1, 6, 8–10), organ (2–5, 9–11), piano (2–5, 11), Mellotron (2, 5), clarinet (3, 4, 11), vocals (3, 9, 11); bongos, Wurlitzer (4); saxophone (7, 8), bass (7, 10, 11), drums (9, 10), vibraphone (11)
- Nick Movshon – bass (tracks 1–6, 8, 9), upright bass (1), percussion (3, 5), guitar (5), mo tuck (2, 3, 8)
- Homer Steinweiss – drums (tracks 1–6, 8), percussion (2, 5)
- Paul Castelluzzo – slide guitar (track 2)
- Dylan Nowik – slide guitar (1), electric guitar (tracks 1, 3), fuzz bass (3), acoustic guitar (1, 4, 9)
- Marco Benevento – piano (tracks 6, 7)
- Dave Guy – trumpet (tracks 7, 8)
- Lee Falco – drums, percussion (track 7)

Technical

- Claire Cottrill – production
- Leon Michels – production, engineering
- Alex Deturk – mastering
- Jens Jungkurth – mixing, engineering
- John Rooney – engineering

== Charts ==
=== Weekly charts ===
Weekly chart performance for Charm
Chart (2024–2025)	Peak position
Australian Albums (ARIA)	4
Belgian Albums (Ultratop Flanders)	50
Canadian Albums (Billboard)	23
Dutch Albums (Album Top 100)	38
French Rock & Metal Albums (SNEP)	16
Irish Albums (Official Charts)	28
New Zealand Albums (RMNZ)	12
Portuguese Albums (AFP)	50
Scottish Albums (Official Charts)	3
Spanish Albums (Promusicae)	81
Swiss Albums (Schweizer Hitparade)	81
UK Albums (Official Charts)	13
UK Independent Albums (Official Charts)	26
US Billboard 200	8

=== Year-end charts ===
Year-end chart performance for Charm
Chart (2025)	Position
Australian Albums (ARIA)	93

== Certifications ==
Certifications for Charm
Region	Certification	Certified units/sales
New Zealand (RMNZ)	Gold	7,500^{‡}
United Kingdom (BPI)	Silver	60,000^{‡}
United States (RIAA)	Gold	500,000^{‡}
^{‡} Sales+streaming figures based on certification alone.
