= Cornerstone (agency) =

American marketing and public relations agency

cornerstone
- Type: Private
- Industry: Marketing
- Founded: 1996
- Headquarters: New York City, United States; Offices: New York, Los Angeles, London
- Key people: Rob Stone, Founder and co-CEO; Jon Cohen, Co-CEO
- Products: Strategic Marketing, Creative, Lifestyle marketing, Digital Promotion, Public Relations
- Number of employees: 90
- Website: www.cornerstoneagency.com

Cornerstone is a New York-based creative lifestyle marketing and public relations agency with offices in New York City, Los Angeles, and London. It was helmed by co-CEOs Rob Stone and Jon Cohen. The company employs approximately 100 professionals worldwide, in addition to a network of field marketing representatives throughout the United States.

== History ==
In June 1996, Rob Stone left a major record label to create Cornerstone, a Manhattan-based music promotion firm that worked primarily with record labels to promote their artists. After being joined by business partner and co-CEO Jon Cohen in 1997, the firm began to expand into a marketing and creative agency that integrated ip music names in corporate branding campaigns.

Stone and Cohen also founded The FADER, a music publication, in 1998.

== Practices ==
In addition to strategic lifestyle marketing and creative services, the agency's practice areas include digital marketing, radio promotion, brand consulting, music supervision and Cornerstone Public Relations, a full-service PR firm.

== Notable campaigns ==
Grammy award-nominated track “Better Than I’ve Ever Been” was commissioned by sportswear company Nike to celebrate the 25th anniversary of Air Force One shoes. Cornerstone executive produced the song, secured Kanye West, Nas, KRS-One and Rakim to collaborate, and oversaw production with Rick Rubin. The track was nominated for the Grammy Award for "Best Rap Performance by a Duo or Group."

My Drive Thru was a collaborative single by The Strokes lead vocalist Julian Casablancas, American singer-songwriter Santigold, and The Neptunes producer and N.E.R.D member Pharrell Williams. The song was created for Converse's centennial and was released in June 2008.

Green Label Sound produces and promotes tracks for notable young artists including Neon Indian, Chromeo and Freelance Whales. The label is managed by Cornerstone on behalf of soft-drink brand Mountain Dew.

In late 2010, Pepsi's chief engagement officer hired Cornerstone to do the creative on the brand's campaign, Pepsi MAX NFL Audible, due to the firm's history of creating successful urban marketing campaigns. TV spots aired during January 2011 NFL playoff games and online, featuring rappers Big Boi, Lupe Fiasco, B.o.B and Talib Kweli.

Cornerstone began construction on Rubber Tracks, a free recording studio managed by Cornerstone and operated by Converse in Brooklyn, NY, in 2010. The 5,200-square-foot (480 m^{2}) space is open for free use to artists in the area.

Cornerstone was also known for its monthly "Cornerstone Mixtape" series, which featured new music from their label clients and were mixed by the top DJ's in the music industry (known as the 1200 Squad). Some of the featured DJ's included DJ Premier, Mark Ronson, Green Lantern, Tony Touch and DJ Khaled. The mixtape was distributed to a select group of radio programmers, music directors, DJs, media and influencers.
