= Blouse (song) =

2021 single by Clairo

- Cover for 7-inch single release

Single by Clairo

from the album Sling
- B-side: "Amoeba"
- Released: June 11, 2021
- Genre: Folk
- Length: 3:15
- Label: Fader; Republic
- Songwriter: Claire Cotrill
- Producers: Clairo; Jack Antonoff

Clairo singles chronology
"I Don't Think I Can Do This Again" (2019)	"Blouse" (2021)	"Sexy to Someone" (2024)

Audio video
- "Blouse" on YouTube

"Blouse" is a song by American singer-songwriter Clairo, released through Fader Label and Republic Records on June 11, 2021, as the lead single from her second studio album, Sling. The song was written by Clairo, produced by Clairo and Jack Antonoff, and features backing vocals from New Zealand singer-songwriter Lorde.

== Background ==
Clairo announced the release of "Blouse" on June 10, 2021, with the song scheduled to come out the following day. It is the lead single from Sling, Clairo's second album.

Clairo speaks about her experiences of being sexualized in the music industry in the song. Talking to Rolling Stone writer Angie Martoccio, Clairo highlighted the lyric of "Why do I tell you how I feel, when you're too busy looking down my blouse? If touch could make them hear, then touch me now" on the song. Clairo explained that "that line is really important to me, because it just captures so much of what that experience feels like. I was pissed off. I was pissed off that that's a part of this, and that I'm just supposed to accept the fact that that's a part of it. I have moments where I wonder if it even matters what I write. I put in so much effort, but is it going to get to a point where I'm just overly sexualized again? You're so desperate for someone to hear you out that you just let them do it."

In 2026, to commemorate the fifth anniversary since the release of Sling, "Blouse" was released as a 7-inch 45 RPM vinyl single with "Amoeba" as its B-side.

== Composition ==
"Blouse" is a folk ballad written in the key of G major. It features backing vocals from Lorde. Lorde's backing vocals were recorded on a rainy day in New Zealand, and raindrops can be heard in the background of her vocals. Speaking to Gemma Sanways of The Guardian, Clairo said of Lorde's involvement that "we talked a lot about how cool it was in the Laurel Canyon era, where people would secretly do background vocals on each other's music – like Joni Mitchell with Carole King – rather than as a way to benefit the business side of things. Back then it was just like: 'I love your voice: will you lend your talent to my song?'"

== Critical reception ==
For Pitchfork, Quinn Moreland wrote that the song "immediately sets itself apart" from her 2019 album Immunity. Of the music, Moreland said that "a hushed acoustic guitar melody is soon joined by gentle orchestral flourishes courtesy of co-producer Jack Antonoff and low-key backing vocals from Lorde". Addressing the line "if touch could make them hear, then touch me now", Moreland stated that the encounter was "a devastating prospect — wanting so badly to be genuinely validated that you contemplate compromising part of yourself". The review concluded by saying that "'Blouse' is a quiet yet bold leap forward for Clairo, one that puts a spotlight on her skills as a songwriter with remarkable ease".

Margaret Farrell of Flood Magazine compared "Blouse" to Lorde's "Liability", saying that the songs "harness the same urgent closeness". Aside from that, Farrell also noted that "orchestral strings swell around Clairo's bruised words", and that "her vocals get slightly louder" towards the end of the song.

== Live performances ==
Clairo performing the song on The Tonight Show Starring Jimmy Fallon

On June 3, 2021, Clairo announced that she would debut "Blouse" on The Tonight Show Starring Jimmy Fallon. She performed the song on June 10 in-studio on The Tonight Show.

In March 2022, videos surfaced of Clairo performing "Blouse" on the Sling Tour. Despite the song's lyrics detailing her discomfort being oversexualized, concertgoers took the opportunity to sexually harass her. The song was not returned to the setlist of her following tour, the Charm Tour.

In 2023, Clairo recorded a live version of "Blouse" for her Live at Electric Lady extended play.

== Credits and personnel ==
Credits adapted from Tidal.

- Clairo – vocals, acoustic guitar, songwriting, production
- Jack Antonoff – production, bass, conductor, electric guitar, Mellotron, slide guitar, strings conductor, mixing, recording engineer
- Lorde – background vocals
- Eric Byers – cello
- Evan Smith – flute, saxophones
- Bobby Hawk – violin
- Laura Sisk – recording engineer
- John Rooney – recording engineer
- Chris Gehringer – mastering engineer
- Will Quinnell – assistant mastering engineer

== Charts ==
Weekly chart positions for "Blouse"
Chart (2021)	Peak position
New Zealand Hot Singles (RMNZ)	36
US Hot Rock & Alternative Songs (Billboard)	32
