= Rob Stone (businessman) =

American music executive (1968–2024)

- Born: July 12, 1968
- Died: June 24, 2024 (aged 55); Mount Kisco, New York, United States
- Occupation: Advertising
- Known for: Cornerstone, The Fader

Rob Stone (July 12, 1968 – June 24, 2024) was an American music, media and branding executive based in New York City. Stone was the founder of the full-service marketing agency Cornerstone and co-founder of music and style publication The Fader.

== Biography ==
Stone attended the University at Albany in 1986 where he studied marketing and finance. Upon graduation in 1990, Stone joined SBK Records and rose to director of promotion. He also served as vice president of promotion at EMI Records. In The Big Payback: The History of the Business of Hip-Hop, author and hip-hop journalist Dan Charnas notes Stone's rise through the ranks at EMI. When label heads Daniel Glass and Fred Davis initially discussed bringing Sean "Puff Daddy" Combs and his label, Bad Boy, to EMI, they brought in Stone - aged 25 - due to his background and knowledge of hip hop. Stone became seen as the record business counterpart to innovative radio programmers such as Keith Naftaly and Hosh Gureli.

In May 1994, Stone joined music executive Clive Davis at Arista Records.

Stone worked with artists such as Notorious B.I.G., Usher Raymond, Sean "Puffy" Combs, Outkast and Faith Evans.

In 1999, Stone co-founded The Fader with Jon Cohen. The magazine was dubbed by The New York Times as "the new music-and-fashion bible". With its 39th issue, The Fader made publishing history as the first to offer a full issue's content available on iTunes.

Stone was a member of the board of directors for Sweetgreen, a farm-to-table salad chain, co-creating the brand's Sweetlife Festival.

Stone also sat on the board for the Children's Cancer Association's music medicine program, MyMusicRx, a digital playground that delivers music medicine to critically ill kids and teens in the United States and Canada.

Stone died from lung cancer on June 24, 2024 in Mount Kisco, New York, at the age of 55.

=== Cornerstone ===
In June 1996, Stone founded Cornerstone, a Manhattan-based music promotion firm that worked primarily with record labels to promote their artists. Stone was joined by business partner and co-CEO Jon Cohen in 1997.

In his book, Dan Charnas documents Stone's work on the original "Obey Your Thirst" Sprite campaign as Stone spearheaded Sprite's first DJ Summit, an event that brought together American radio jockeys and artists. In turn, this event eventually led to partnerships with hip hop acts such as at Fat Joe, Red Man, Missy Elliot, and Common, and the creation of the "Voltron" Sprite Hip Hop commercials.

Additional campaigns under Stone's direction at Cornerstone include Nike's “Better Than I've Ever Been”. Commissioned by the sportswear company at the 25th anniversary of Air Force One shoes, Cornerstone executive produced the song, secured Kanye West, Nas, KRS-One and Rakim to collaborate, and oversaw production with Rick Rubin. The track was nominated for the Grammy Award for "Best Rap Performance by a Duo or Group." My Drive Thru was a collaborative single by The Strokes lead vocalist Julian Casablancas, American singer-songwriter Santigold, and The Neptunes producer and N.E.R.D member Pharrell Williams. The song was created for Converse's centennial and was released in June 2008. Among Cornerstone's music related initiatives are Green Label Sound by Mountain Dew and Rubber Tracks, a recording studio managed by Converse in Brooklyn, New York.
