= Paper Castles =

Paper Castles may refer to:

- Paper Castles (album), a 2019 album by Alice Phoebe Lou
- Paper Castles (film), a 2009 Spanish romantic drama film
