= Bedroom Tapes =

Bedroom Tapes may refer to:

- Bedroom Tapes (EP), by Jakob Ogawa, 2017
- The Bedroom Tapes, a 2000 album by Carly Simon
- Bedroom Tapes, unreleased material recorded by Brian Wilson of The Beach Boys
