= Sling (album) =

Studio album by Clairo
- Released: July 16, 2021
- Recorded: 2020
- Studios: Allaire (Shokan, New York); Electric Lady (New York City)
- Genres: Pop; folk rock; baroque pop; chamber folk; soft rock
- Length: 44:33
- Labels: Fader; Republic
- Producers: Clairo; Jack Antonoff; Sam Baker

Clairo chronology
Immunity (2019)	Sling (2021)	Charm (2024)

Singles from Sling
- 1. "Blouse" Released: June 11, 2021

Sling is the second studio album by American singer-songwriter Clairo. Released on July 16, 2021, through Fader and Republic. It serves as the follow-up to her debut album, Immunity. The album was announced on June 11, 2021, alongside the release of the lead single, "Blouse". The album was produced by Clairo, alongside Jack Antonoff and Sam Baker.

Sling has been characterized as multiple genres: vintage pop, acoustic folk, folk rock, baroque pop, and chamber folk. Work began on the album in early 2020, with Clairo posting screenshots of a playlist titled 'Album 2 (demos so far)'. It was revealed that "Reaper" was the first she wrote for the record, and had then recorded 35 demos thereafter. Recording for the album took place at Allaire Recording Studios in upstate New York, and was later completed at Electric Lady Studios.

After its release, Sling received widespread critical acclaim by music critics, praising a noticeable expansion in Clairo's vocals, and the maturity of her songwriting. The album was a commercial success, debuting at number 17 on the US Billboard 200, making it her first top 20 album. In 2022, Clairo embarked on the Sling Tour in support of the album.

== Background and release ==
In April 2020, it was reported that Clairo had begun work on her follow-up to Immunity when she shared a screenshot of a playlist titled 'Album 2 (demos so far)'. One demo, titled 'february 15, 2020 london, uk (demo)', dates back to February 2020 and another titled 'Everything I Know' from the beginning of April. In the writing process, Clairo admitted that "Joanie, my dog, opened up my world in ways I didn't think were capable. By caring for her, it forced me to face my own thoughts about parenthood and what it would mean to me." Having started writing in July 2020, Clairo revealed that "Reaper" was the first song she wrote for the record, and had then recorded approximately 35 of its demos thereafter.

The recording of Sling took place during 2020 at Allaire Recording Studios in upstate New York, and was completed at Electric Lady Studios in New York City. Prior to the announcement of Sling, Clairo provided background vocals on Lorde's song "Solar Power" alongside Phoebe Bridgers. On June 11, 2021, Clairo released the lead single of the album, "Blouse", which features background vocals from Lorde. Our Culture named "Blouse" one of the best songs for the week of June 14, 2021. The song was performed on The Tonight Show Starring Jimmy Fallon. In 2022, she embarked on the Sling Tour, with Arlo Parks as an opening act.

== Music and lyrics ==
Sling has been described as a vintage pop, acoustic folk, folk rock, baroque pop, and chamber folk record. Rolling Stone reporter Jonathan Bernstein deemed it a concept album about "aging and feeling older than you ought to". "Blouse" has been described as a folk tune and "crushing ballad" where Clairo sings over a "hushed acoustic guitar" as well as "orchestral swings". Clairo's vocals become louder in the song mix as the track progresses and includes backing vocals performed by Lorde.

== Critical reception ==
Professional ratings
Aggregate scores
Source	Rating
AnyDecentMusic?	7.9/10
Metacritic	84/100
Review scores
Source	Rating
AllMusic	3.5/5 stars
The A.V. Club	A−
Clash	9/10
Gigwise	9/10 stars
The Line of Best Fit	9/10
NME	5/5 stars
The Observer	4/5 stars
Pitchfork	7.4/10
Rolling Stone	4/5 stars
Slant Magazine	3/5 stars

Sling received critical acclaim upon release. At Metacritic, which assigns a normalized rating out of 100 to reviews from mainstream critics, the album received an average score of 84, which indicates "universal acclaim", based on 21 reviews.

The Line of Best Fit writer Jay Singh described the record to contain relatable themes like "yearning for stability, grappling with our mortality, and striving to treat ourselves with care". He noted that Cotrill handles the heavy topics of "Blouse" and "Just for Today" with "grace and nuance far beyond her years". He concluded the review about how "Cottrill can take solace in knowing she’s created something timeless".

Jem Aswad from Variety called the album a "vintage pop triumph". He also wrote that Clairo "advanced dramatically as a singer". He noted that record producer Rostam Batmanglij, on Immunity would load echo on her voice for compensation of her limited range but on Sling, her and Jack Antonoff have multi-tracked her voice that has "delicately layered harmonies". He said that the record featured baroque touches with vintage keyboards, Wurlitzer electric piano, and a string quartet.

=== Accolades ===
Publication	Accolade	Rank	Ref.
Dork	Dork's Albums of 2021	31	
Evening Standard	The best albums of 2021	—N/a	
The Guardian	The 50 best albums of 2021	29	
The Line of Best Fit	The Best Albums of 2021 Ranked	30	
NME	The 50 best albums of 2021	14	
Stereogum	The 50 Best Albums of 2021	19	
Uproxx	The Best Albums Of 2021	—N/a	

== Track listing ==
No.	Title	Writer(s)	Length
1.	"Bambi"	Claire Cottrill; Jack Antonoff	4:37
2.	"Amoeba"	Cottrill; Antonoff	3:48
3.	"Partridge"	Cottrill; Antonoff	3:13
4.	"Zinnias"	Cottrill; Antonoff	2:54
5.	"Blouse"	Cottrill	3:15
6.	"Wade"	Cottrill	4:46
7.	"Harbor"	Cottrill; Sam Baker	4:24
8.	"Just for Today"	Cottrill	3:37
9.	"Joanie"	Cottrill; Antonoff	4:45
10.	"Reaper"	Cottrill	2:39
11.	"Little Changes"	Cottrill; Antonoff	2:40
12.	"Management"	Cottrill	3:48
Total length:			44:33

== Personnel ==
Musicians

- Clairo – vocals, production (all tracks), electric guitar (1–3, 12), piano (1–3, 6, 7, 9–12), Wurlitzer electric piano (1–3, 9–11), Kalimba (2, 6), Hammond B3 (3), 12-string acoustic guitar (4), acoustic guitar (4, 5, 8, 10), keyboards, Mellotron, synthesizer (7); vibraphone (7, 12), clavichord (9), clapping (10)
- Jack Antonoff – production (all tracks), bass (1–7, 10, 11), clavichord (1, 2), electric guitar (1–6, 9–12), drums (1–4, 6, 7, 9, 11), Mellotron (1, 5–8, 11, 12), piano (1, 7, 10), 12-string acoustic guitar (2, 4, 6, 7), acoustic guitar (2, 4, 6, 7, 9), fretless bass (2, 4), Moog bass (2, 4, 6, 7, 9, 11, 12), programming (2), slide guitar (2, 5, 11, 12), Wurlitzer electric piano (2, 3, 6, 12), acoustic bass guitar (4, 12), lap steel guitar (4, 6), synthesizer (4, 5), strings conductor (5, 8), Kalimba (6), upright bass (6, 7, 10), Rhodes piano (12)
- Evan Smith – flute, saxophones (1, 2, 4–7, 10, 12); synthesizer (1, 4, 5), clarinet (4, 6, 7, 12), violin (7)
- Lorde – background vocals (5, 10)
- Eric Byers – cello (5)
- Bobby Hawk – violin (5, 8, 12)
- Sam Baker – acoustic guitar, Kalimba, lute, ukulele (6); piano, production (7)
- Jake Passmore – acoustic bass guitar (7), acoustic guitar (7, 12), background vocals (12)
- Joanie Cottrill – chimes, snoring (9)

Technical

- Chris Gehringer – mastering engineer
- Jack Antonoff – mixer, recording engineer
- Laura Sisk – mixer (1–4, 6, 7, 10–12), recording engineer (1–8, 10–12)
- John Rooney – recording engineer (4–6, 8, 9, 11), assistant recording engineer (1–3, 7, 10, 12)
- Sam Baker – recording engineer (6, 7, 12)
- Will Quinnell – assistant mastering engineer
- Shubham Mondal – assistant recording engineer (2, 4, 8, 9, 11)

== Charts ==
Chart performance for Sling
Chart (2021)	Peak position
Australian Albums (ARIA)	88
Irish Albums (IRMA)	65
Scottish Albums (Official Charts)	16
UK Albums (Official Charts)	73
US Billboard 200	17
