= Sofia (Clairo song) =

2019 single by Clairo

Single by Clairo

from the album Immunity
- Released: July 26, 2019
- Genre: Eurodisco; dance-rock; soft rock
- Length: 3:08
- Label: Fader Label
- Songwriters: Claire Cottrill; Rostam Batmanglij
- Producer: Rostam Batmanglij

Clairo singles chronology
"Closer to You" (2019)	"Sofia" (2019)	"I Don't Think I Can Do This Again" (2019)

"Sofia" is a song by American singer-songwriter Clairo from her debut studio album, Immunity (2019). It was released as a single on July 26, 2019. Characterized as a soft rock, eurodisco, and dance-rock song, it was written by Clairo and Rostam Batmanglij, who also produced the song, and features drums from Danielle Haim.

"Sofia" received positive reviews from critics, which became a sleeper hit after going viral on the video-sharing platform TikTok, charting on the Billboard Hot 100 more than a year after its initial release.

== Composition and release ==
Musically, "Sofia" is a Eurodisco, dance-rock, and soft rock song, with a pulsating electropop beat and a length of three minutes and eight seconds. The track contains lyrics such as "Sofia, know that you and I / Shouldn't feel like a crime". Lyrically, the song was inspired by her first experiences having crushes on older women whom she saw in the media. She named Sofía Vergara and Sofia Coppola as examples, and claimed that writing "Sofia" was her way of celebrating her discovery whilst "maintaining the cheesy/corny lyrics you'd normally find in songs where you profess your love". She continued by writing that the song "captures a moment in [her] life but instead of hiding it, it's expressed in an almost 'explosive' manner".

Immunity was announced on May 24, 2019, it was then released on August 2, 2019 through Fader, with "Sofia" as the seventh track. "Sofia" was later released as a single on July 26, 2019, following the lead single, "Bags", previously released on May 24, 2019 alongside the album announcement.

== Critical reception ==
"Sofia" received generally positive reviews from retrospective music critics, with Carolyn Droke of Uproxx describing the song as an "anthem for the actualization of [Clairo's] sexuality", saying that the lyrics and rhythm "encapsulate feelings of exhilaration and trepidation at the threshold of a new relationship". Harry Todd of Paste compared the production of the song to that of the Strokes and Sleigh Bells, with its "heavily processed guitars and crunchy drums". He continued to praise producer Batmanglij for "peppering [the song] with arpeggiated synths and vocoder melodies that recall Daft Punk's lovelorn slow-burns", and Clairo for "selling" the song with her vocal performance. Katherine St. Asaph of Pitchfork compared the synths in "Sofia" to that of "Dancing on My Own" by Robyn.

== Commercial performance ==
In the United States, "Sofia" peaked at number five both the Hot Rock & Alternative Songs and the Alternative Airplay charts respectively. Additionally, it peaked at number 98 on the Billboard Hot 100 chart the week of October 20, 2020. In Canada, the song peaked at number 85 on the Canadian Hot 100 chart. In the United Kingdom, "Sofia" peaked at number 75 the week of October 29, 2020. On individual national charts, it reached number 45 on the Irish Singles chart, 16 in Singapore, 7 in Malaysia. The song has been certified Platinum by the Recording Industry Association of America (RIAA), Music Canada, and Pro-Música Brasil (PMB), and certified gold by the British Phonographic Industry (BPI), Australian Recording Industry Association (ARIA), Polish Society of the Phonographic Industry (ZPAV), and Associação Fonográfica Portuguesa (AFP).

== Credits and personnel ==
Credits adapted from Apple Music.

- Claire Cottrill – vocals, electric guitar, songwriter
- Rostam Batmanglij – synthesizer, electric guitar, programming, bass, songwriter producer, recording engineer
- Danielle Haim – drums
- Emily Lazar – mastering engineer
- Chris Allgood – assistant mastering engineer
- Dave Fridmann – mixer
- Cary Singer – recording engineer
- Nate Head – recording engineer
- Dalton Ricks – recording engineer
- Michael Harris – recording engineer

== Charts ==
=== Weekly charts ===
Chart (2019–2021)	Peak position
Australia (ARIA)	99
Belgium (Ultratip Bubbling Under Flanders)	45
Canada (Canadian Hot 100)	85
Ireland (IRMA)	45
Malaysia (RIM)	7
New Zealand Hot Singles (RMNZ)	36
Singapore (RIAS)	16
UK Singles (Official Charts)	75
US Billboard Hot 100	98
US Hot Rock & Alternative Songs (Billboard)	5
US Alternative Airplay (Billboard)	5

=== Year-end charts ===
Chart (2020)	Position
US Hot Rock & Alternative Songs (Billboard)	45
Chart (2021)	Position
US Hot Rock & Alternative Songs (Billboard)	28

== Certifications ==
Certifications for "Sofia"
Region	Certification	Certified units/sales
Australia (ARIA)	Gold	35,000^{‡}
Brazil (Pro-Música Brasil)	2× Platinum	80,000^{‡}
Canada (Music Canada)	2× Platinum	160,000^{‡}
New Zealand (RMNZ)	Platinum	30,000^{‡}
Poland (ZPAV)	Gold	25,000^{‡}
Portugal (AFP)	Gold	5,000^{‡}
United Kingdom (BPI)	Gold	400,000^{‡}
United States (RIAA)	2× Platinum	2,000,000^{‡}
^{‡} Sales+streaming figures based on certification alone.
