= Jakob (artist) =

- Jakob performing in 2018

Background information
- Also known as: Jakob Ogawa
- Born: Jakob Elias Iversen Myklebust; May 26, 1998 (age 28); Trondheim, Norway
- Origin: Oslo, Norway
- Genres: hypnagogic pop; indie pop; lo-fi; bedroom pop; jangle pop
- Occupations: Musician; songwriter; producer
- Instruments: Vocals; bass; guitar; keyboards; drums; percussion
- Years active: 2016–present
- Label: Playground Music

Jakob Elias Iversen Myklebust (born 26 May 1998), known professionally as Jakob (formerly Jakob Ogawa), is a Norwegian singer-songwriter and multi-instrumentalist. He released his debut EP Bedroom Tapes in 2017 and the follow-up EP April in 2019. He collaborated with American singer Clairo on his single "You Might Be Sleeping". His music is considered influential in defining the late 2010s bedroom pop genre.

== Early life ==
Jakob was born in Trondheim, Norway in 1998, to a theater director mother and a musician father. He was primarily raised by his mother in Oslo, but relocated to Trondheim during his early teens to stay with his father, which marked the beginning of his songwriting experimentation. He eventually returned to Oslo to attend the city's Waldorf high school, where he first met the original members of his live touring band. In a 2017 profile with Nylon, when asked where he hoped to be professionally in five years, he responded, "A lawyer, hopefully."

== Career and touring ==
After the 2016 release of his debut single, "You'll Be on My Mind", Jakob served as the support act for American indie pop band LANY during their concert in Oslo, September 2016. This led to the group inviting him to join them across multiple tour runs throughout Europe. Early 2017, he released his second single "All Your Love" which secured him a record deal with Playground Music and a by:Larm appearance. He subsequently supported Sondre Lerche and Metronomy on tour. In mid-2017, his song "You Might Be Sleeping" came together after Myklebust sent a direct message to American singer Clairo via SoundCloud; facing a strict two-week deadline from his label, Clairo tracked her vocals and returned the file within 48 hours.

In the fall of 2017, "All Your Love" appeared on Comedy Central's Broad City and would later appear in HBO's High Maintenance. He performed at Lollapalooza Argentina and Roskilde Festival in 2018. Following his 2019 EP April, he completed headline tours across the United States consisting of multiple sold-out club dates, despite lacking local radio support in Norway. In May 2019, he served as the central act for the Lokatara Fest at The Pallas in Jakarta, Indonesia.

His 2019 single, "You and I", was included in the soundtrack of the HBO television series Insecure.

Jakob's music also received public endorsement from Doja Cat, who featured his songs on Instagram livestreams and in a 2019 interview segment with Genius.

He resumed touring in Asia and Europe through 2022–2025. Across his global tour runs and cumulative catalog history, his music has amassed over 600 million global streams.

== Music videos and cinematography ==
Jakob's videography emphasizes analog formats and cinematic homages, utilizing references to 1990s Asian cinema in videos like "You Might Be Sleeping" and "Next to Me". For "April", he collaborated with James Rönkkö and Alice Agrusa on a video featuring a Bigfoot character named Walter.

== Songwriting ==
Myklebust records his material from home by himself. When explaining his songwriting process, Myklebust stated that he prefers to write lyrics in a waterproof notebook while in the shower. His early music focused heavily on after-school nostalgia and intimacy, utilizing vulnerabilities as strengths. His later projects deal with themes of self-isolation and discovering self-love. He has cited cinema and artistic figures like The Beatles, Prince, and Nikki Giovanni as influences on his songwriting.

== Discography ==
=== Extended plays ===
| Title | EP details |
|---|---|
| Bedroom Tapes | Released: 16 June 2017; Label: Playground Music; Formats: LP, digital download, streaming |
| April | Released: 27 September 2019; Label: Playground Music; Formats: Digital download, streaming |

=== Singles ===
| Title | Year | Album / EP |
|---|---|---|
| "You'll Be on My Mind" | 2016 | Non-album single |
| "All Your Love" | 2017 | Non-album single |
| "Let It Pass" | 2017 | Bedroom Tapes |
| "You Might Be Sleeping" (featuring Clairo) | 2017 | Bedroom Tapes |
| "Velvet Light" | 2018 | Non-album singles |
| "Sunshine Girl" (includes "Sunshine Girl (demo)" and "Sunshine Girl Pt. 2") | 2018 | Non-album singles |
| "All I Wanna Do" | 2019 | Non-album single |
| "You and I" | 2019 | April |
| "Swan" | 2025 | Non-album singles |
| "Blow" | 2025 | Non-album singles |

== Awards and nominations ==
| Year | Award | Category | Nominated work | Result |
|---|---|---|---|---|
| 2017 | by:Larm | Role Model of the Year | Himself | Nominated |
| 2018 | Subjektprisen | Artist of the Year | Himself | Nominated |
| 2020 | Bendiksen Award | Pop Talent Development | Himself | Nominated |
| 2020 | Musikkforleggerprisen | Best Synchronization | "All Your Love" (in High Maintenance) | Nominated |
