= Bedroom Tapes (EP) =

EP by Jakob
- Released: 16 June 2017
- Recorded: 2016–2017
- Studios: Home studio (Oslo, Norway)
- Genres: jangle pop, indie pop, lo-fi, alternative R&B
- Length: 11:08
- Label: Playground Music
- Producer: Jakob Myklebust

Jakob chronology
Bedroom Tapes (2017)	April (2019)

Bedroom Tapes is the debut extended play from Norwegian artist Jakob (then performing under the name Jakob Ogawa). It was released through Playground Music on June 16, 2017. It has been associated by music journalists with the late-2010s bedroom pop genre.

The five-track project was recorded by Jakob in his bedroom. Contemporary critics described it as a part-jangle-pop, part-alt-R&B collection, drawing comparisons to artists like Dudley Perkins and Ariel Pink.

== Critical reception ==
Professional ratings
Review scores
Source	Rating
Dagens Næringsliv	Positive
Deichman Musikk	5/6 stars
Subjekt	5/6 stars
Chicago Reader	Positive
VG	Positive

The EP received praise from Subjekt and Dagens Næringsliv. Some publications, such as Alt Citizen focused only on the track "You Might Be Sleeping".

Noah Berlatsky for the Chicago Reader opined:

His formula doesn't provide for a lot of variation (the EP is basically one dreamy groove after another), but the point is to let your eyes cross and drift into your own consciousness, and/or into the consciousness of some significant consenting other. The EP's standout track, a duet with American lo-fi singer Clairo called "You Might Be Sleeping," falls along those lines; Clairo answers Ogawa's croony come-ons with a breathy distance ("Baby when you're near / It's warm/ And sad") before they slide into gentle harmony like they're sinking into a midafternoon bubble bath.

== Track listing ==
All tracks are written by Jakob Myklebust.

No.	Title	Length
1.	"Up And Away"	1:51
2.	"You Might Be Sleeping" (featuring Clairo)	2:27
3.	"Perfect Sweet Blue"	2:19
4.	"Next To Me"	2:04
5.	"Let It Pass"	2:06

== Personnel ==
Adapted from the liner notes.

- Jakob Myklebust – vocals, instrumentation, songwriting, recording engineering, mixing
- Clairo – vocals on "You Might Be Sleeping"
- Ian Thomas Miller – album artwork design
- Joe Lambert – mastering

== Release history ==
Region	Date	Format	Label
Europe	June 16, 2017	Digital download, streaming	Playground Music
Europe	September 16, 2019	LP	Playground Music
