= Paper Castles (album) =

Studio album by Alice Phoebe Lou
- Released: March 8, 2019
- Label: Alice Phoebe Lou (Self-released)
- Producer: Noah Georgeson

Alice Phoebe Lou chronology
| Orbit (2016) | Paper Castles (2019) |

Singles from Paper Castles
- 1. "Something Holy" Released: November 30, 2018; 2. "Skin Crawl" Released: January 15, 2019; 3. "Galaxies" Released: February 15, 2019

Professional ratings
Review scores
| Source | Rating |
|---|---|
| Consequence of Sound | B |
| Exclaim | 8/10 |

Paper Castles is the second studio album by South African singer-songwriter Alice Phoebe Lou. She self-released it on March 8, 2019, by buying the CD and vinyl manufacturing services from Motor Entertainment.

On 4 December 2019 Paper Castles album was listed at number 19 in the NBHAP magazine's 50 best albums of 2019 list.

== Track listing ==
| No. | Title | Length |
|---|---|---|
| 1. | "Little Spark" | 2:52 |
| 2. | "Nostalgia" | 3:17 |
| 3. | "Galaxies" | 5:08 |
| 4. | "Paper Castles" | 3:54 |
| 5. | "Fynbos" | 3:31 |
| 6. | "Something Holy" | 4:46 |
| 7. | "Skin Crawl" | 2:18 |
| 8. | "My Outside" | 3:09 |
| 9. | "New Song" | 4:15 |
| 10. | "Ocean" | 4:15 |

== Personnel ==
- Alice Phoebe Lou – lead vocals, electric guitar, metallophone, percussion, bass drum, synthesizer
- Eden Leshem – backing vocals
- Helen Catherine Wells – backing vocals
- Paolo Guolo – saxophone, flute
- Ziv Yamin – piano, organ, synthesizer, percussion
- Samur Khouja – synthesizer
- Noah Georgeson – synthesizer, percussion, cymbal
- Dekel Adin – bass, percussion, electric guitar
- Julian Berann – drums, percussion
