= Jon Cohen (entrepreneur) =

American music, media and branding executive

- Occupations: Co-CEO of Cornerstone; Co-founder of The Fader; Co-founder Fader Label

Jon Cohen is an American music and media executive in New York City.

== Early life and education ==
Cohen graduated from Syracuse University's Newhouse School of Communication in 1990 with a bachelor's degree in television and radio, film and marketing.

== Career ==
After graduation he joined EMI's SBK label, promoting Blur and Jesus Jones. Cohen then worked for Columbia-Sony with Jeff Buckley, Alice in Chains and The Presidents of the United States of America. In May 2012, he was honored by Syracuse University's music and entertainment industry Bandier Program (founded by Sony/ATV Music Publishing chairman and CEO Martin Bandier) for contributions to the program.

In 1997, less than a year after Rob Stone founded Cornerstone (a New York-based creative-lifestyle marketing firm with offices in Los Angeles and London which is "charting a new direction for the music industry"), Cohen left Columbia to join Stone as a partner and co-CEO at Cornerstone (which was recognized in 2007 for its integration of musicians in advertising campaigns).

Cohen is a member of the board of directors for Sweetgreen, a farm-to-table salad chain, and helped create the annual Sweetlife Festival concert. He is also on the board of the Children's Cancer Association's music-medicine program, MyMusicRx, a digital playground delivering music to critically ill youth in the United States and Canada.

=== The Fader ===
In 1999, Cohen co-founded The Fader with Rob Stone. An award-winning magazine, it was called "the new music-and-fashion bible" by the New York Times. With its 39th issue, The Fader became the first full-length magazine available on iTunes.

In 2002, Cohen co-founded Fader Label with Rob Stone. Its roster includes Matt and Kim, the Editors, Neon Indian, Bird Monster, Saul Williams and Yuna. In spring 2003 they began Fader Films, an artist-friendly production division which has released critically acclaimed films (including Hooked: The Legend of Demetrius 'Hook' Mitchell and On The Outs. In 2021, they launched a management division of Fader Label with a roster including Del Water Gap, James Ivy, and Shallou. With Stone, Cohen is one of the "veteran music marketers" behind the Fader Fort at South by Southwest, presenting "some of the most memorable events at South by Southwest, like Kanye West's appearance two years ago and breakout performances by M.I.A. and Amy Winehouse."

=== Advertising campaigns ===
Successful campaigns under Cohen's direction at Cornerstone include Nike's "Better Than I've Ever Been". Commissioned by the sportswear company for the 25th anniversary of Air Force One shoes, the Cornerstone executive produced the song, secured Kanye West, Nas, KRS-One and Rakim to collaborate and oversaw production with Rick Rubin. The track was nominated for a Grammy Award for Best Rap Performance by a Duo or Group. "My Drive Thru" was a collaborative single by The Strokes' lead vocalist Julian Casablancas, American singer-songwriter Santigold and The Neptunes producer and N.E.R.D. member Pharrell Williams. The song was created for Converse's centennial, and was released in June 2008. Among Cornerstone's music-related initiatives are Green Label Sound by Mountain Dew and Rubber Tracks, a recording studio managed by Converse in Brooklyn, New York.

In late 2010, Pepsi's chief engagement officer hired Cornerstone for the creative work on the company's Pepsi MAX NFL Audible campaign. TV spots aired during January 2011 NFL playoff games and online, featuring rappers Big Boi, Lupe Fiasco, B.o.B. and Talib Kweli. In 2012, Pepsi retained Cornerstone for its NFL Pepsi Anthems campaign featuring Kelly Clarkson, Travie McCoy, Wiz Khalifa and Kid Rock.
