= Bags (song) =

2019 song by Clairo

Single by Clairo

from the album Immunity
- Released: May 24, 2019
- Genre: Indie pop; bedroom pop; shoegaze; alternative rock
- Length: 4:21
- Label: Fader Label
- Songwriter: Claire Cottrill
- Producers: Clairo; Rostam Batmanglij

Clairo singles chronology
"4Ever" (2018)	"Bags" (2019)	"Closer to You" / "Sofia" (2019)

Audio video
- "Bags" on YouTube

"Bags" is a song recorded by American singer-songwriter Clairo. Fader Label released it as the first single from her debut studio album, Immunity, on May 24, 2019. The song features drums from Danielle Haim, and was produced by Rostam Batmanglij and Clairo, who also wrote the song.

"Bags" gained over 20 million streams in 2019, and was nominated for "Song of the Year" at the 2019 Boston Music Awards. The song was ranked at No. 5 on the list of Hottest Records of the Year by BBC Radio 1.

== Background ==
Clairo made her second television appearance performing the song on The Ellen DeGeneres Show in October 2019. Dominic Fike performed a cover of the song on Triple J's Like a Version on October 18, 2019.

== Composition and lyrics ==
An indie pop, bedroom pop, shoegaze, and alternative rock song, "Bags" draws inspiration from Clairo's first romantic experiences with a girl. She tackles the line between friend and lover with a crush who could possibly be straight. Clairo wonders if the feelings between them are mutual and whether she should make the first move when she sings "Can you see me? I'm waiting for the right time / I can't read you, but if you want the pleasure's all mine." "The whole song has this nervous energy," Clairo told NME, saying that the song has "a mix of really calculated parts to reflect the calculated energy you have in a first experience with someone,"

Harry Todd from Paste praised "Bags" for its layers, stating that "A set of simple guitar chords, understated drum fills, plunking keys" are familiar elements of Clairo's music. Shaad d'Souza from The FADER described the song as a "gently strummed track" that "builds to a peak augmented by warped guitars and piano."

BroadwayWorld noted that the song gives a "glimpse into the artist's growth both as a young queer woman, straight out of college". Rachel Hammermueller from Earmilk claims that the song "explores an adult relationship while still having a fresh background mixing".

== Critical reception ==
=== Accolades ===
At the end of 2019, "Bags" appeared on a number of critics' lists ranking the year's top songs.

==== Mid-year lists ====
Publication	Accolade	Rank	Ref.
Elle	The 31 Best Songs of 2019 (So Far)	23	
Thrillist	The 55 Best Songs of 2019 (So Far)	-	

==== Year-end lists ====
Publication	Accolade	Rank	Ref.
BBC	The Top 20 Songs of 2019	4	
BBC News	The Top 10 Songs of 2019	10	
Billboard	The 100 Best Songs of 2019	48	
Dazed	The 20 Best Songs of 2019	8	
Flood Magazine	The 10 Best Songs of 2019	2	
The Guardian	The 20 Best Songs of 2019	9	
The New York Times	The 54 Best Songs of 2019	9	
NME	The 50 Best Songs of 2019	14	
Paste	The 50 Best Songs of 2019	4	
Pitchfork	The 100 Best Songs of 2019	3	
The Ringer	The 10 Best Songs of 2019	3	
Rolling Stone	The 50 Best Songs of 2019	48	
Stereogum	The 100 Best Songs of 2019	-	
Uproxx	The 50 Best Songs of 2019	27	

==== Decade-end lists ====
Publication	Accolade	Rank	Ref.
Paste	The 100 Best Songs of The 2010s	98	
Pitchfork	The 200 Best Songs of The 2010s	123	

== Credits and personnel ==
Credits adapted from Tidal.

- Claire Cottrill – vocals, songwriter, producer
- Rostam Batmanglij – producer, recording engineer
- Danielle Haim – drums
- Emily Lazar – mastering engineer
- Shaun Everett – mixer

== Charts ==
Chart (2019)	Peak position
Belgium (Ultratip Bubbling Under Wallonia)	46
New Zealand Hot Singles (RMNZ)	32
US Hot Rock & Alternative Songs (Billboard)	11
Chart (2026)	Peak position
Philippines Hot 100 (Billboard Philippines)	91

== Certifications ==
Region	Certification	Certified units/sales
Brazil (Pro-Música Brasil)	Gold	20,000^{‡}
Canada (Music Canada)	Platinum	80,000^{‡}
New Zealand (RMNZ)	Platinum	30,000^{‡}
United Kingdom (BPI)	Platinum	600,000^{‡}
United States (RIAA)	Platinum	1,000,000^{‡}
^{‡} Sales+streaming figures based on certification alone.
