= Juna =

2024 single by Clairo

Single by Clairo

from the album Charm
- Released: July 12, 2024
- Genre: R&B; jazz-pop; psychedelia
- Songwriters: Marco Benevento; Claire Elizabeth Cottrill; Leon Michels
- Producers: Cottrill; Michels

Clairo singles chronology
"Nomad" (2024)	"Juna" (2024)	"Add Up My Love" (2024)

Music video
- "Juna" on YouTube

"Juna" is a song by American singer-songwriter Clairo from her third studio album, Charm (2024). Clairo performed the song on The Tonight Show Starring Jimmy Fallon to promote the album, to positive reviews. In August 2024, a music video for the song was released, marking her first professional music video and first music video overall in over six years. The video followed Clairo at an independent wrestling event.

== Composition ==
The song was written by Clairo, Marco Benevento, and Leon Michels, and produced by Clairo and Michels. It has been described as a rhythm and blues song by Rolling Stone.

== Release and promotion ==
On July 17, 2024, Clairo performed the song live on The Tonight Show Starring Jimmy Fallon to promote the album. The Guardian praised the intimate and light-hearted feel of the performance. In its review, Clash described Clairo's performance of "Juna" as a cohesive and delicate rendition, likening the arrangement to "a gossamer spider's web of soulful pop".

== Music video ==
On August 4, Clairo released a music video for the song, her first professional music video and first music video in six years. The music video, directed by Bradley J. Calder, features Clairo attending an independent wrestling event held at a Veterans of Foreign Wars hall. She initially watches a battle royal–style match alone before being joined by a crowd. In subsequent scenes, Clairo poses with the wrestlers backstage, while both the audience and the ring announcer lip-sync the song's closing melody.

== Reception ==
In a review for The Guardian, "Juna" was described as the R&B-influenced centrepiece of the album, with lyrics expressing desire and instrumentation incorporating keys and vintage synthesizers. In July 2025, the song was used in a viral internet meme where performative males, men who pretended to like stereotypically feminine media and fashion to attract female attention, made videos to the song. In the United States, the song reached number 1 on the TikTok Billboard Top 50 chart, number 3 on the Bubbling Under Hot 100 chart, number 15 on the Hot Rock & Alternative Songs chart, and additionally reached number 19 on the Aotearoa Music charts in New Zealand.

== Charts ==
Chart performance for "Juna"
Chart (2024)	Peak position
TikTok Billboard Top 50	1
US Bubbling Under Hot 100	3
US Hot Rock & Alternative Songs	15
Tukutahi Arotini 40	19

== Certifications ==
Certifications for "Juna"
Region	Certification	Certified units/sales
Australia (ARIA)	Gold	35,000^{‡}
New Zealand (RMNZ)	Platinum	30,000^{‡}
United Kingdom (BPI)	Silver	200,000^{‡}
United States (RIAA)	Gold	500,000^{‡}
^{‡} Sales+streaming figures based on certification alone.
