= Classic (Better Than I've Ever Been) =

Single by Kanye West, Nas, and KRS-One (with Rakim on the remix)
- Released: February 20, 2007
- Recorded: 2007
- Genre: Hip hop
- Length: 4:07; 4:42 (DJ Premier Remix)
- Label: Nike
- Songwriters: Biddu Appaiah; Carlton Douglas; William Griffin; Nasir Jones; Lawrence Parker; Kanye West; Rodney Temperton
- Producers: Rick Rubin; DJ Premier

Kanye West singles chronology
"I Still Love H.E.R." (2007)	"Classic (Better Than I've Ever Been)" (2007)	"Can't Tell Me Nothing" (2007)

Nas singles chronology
"Can't Forget About You" (2007)	"Classic (Better Than I've Ever Been)" (2007)	"Less Than an Hour" (2007)

KRS-One singles chronology
"My Life" (2006)	"Classic (Better Than I've Ever Been)" (2007)	"Kill a Rapper" (2007)

Music video
- "Classic (Better Than I've Ever Been) (DJ Premier Remix)" on YouTube

"Classic (Better Than I've Ever Been)" is a song by American rappers Kanye West, Nas, and KRS-One. Produced by Rick Rubin and DJ Premier, it was released as a single on February 20, 2007 by Nike Records. It was performed live at the Nike Air Force Ones 25th anniversary party shown on MTV2.

Its remix, "Better Than I've Ever Been DJ Premier Remix", is produced by DJ Premier, and it features Rakim along with the aforementioned rappers. It features DJ Premier's signature scratches from prior songs such as Nas' "One Love" and "It Ain't Hard to Tell". The song was nominated for Best Rap Collaboration at the 50th Grammy Awards in 2008.

Proceeds from the song's sales go towards youth leadership programs through the Force4Change Fund.

The song is often misinterpreted as a DJ Premier track featuring Rakim, Nas and KRS-ONE and excluding Kanye West. This is due to a popular upload of the music video on YouTube where DJ Premier is credited as the artist and Kanye West's opening verse is removed from the video. The music video itself was released for the DJ Premier Remix of the song.

== Track listing ==
Side A produced by Rick Rubin and Side B produced by DJ Premier.

Side A
No.	Title	Length
1.	"Better Than I've Ever Been" (featuring Kanye West, Nas and KRS-One)	4:07
2.	"Better Than I've Ever Been (Instrumental)"	4:08
3.	"Better Than I've Ever Been (Acapella)"	3:43
Total length:		11:58

Side B
No.	Title	Length
1.	"Classic (Better Than I've Ever Been - DJ Premier Remix)" (featuring Kanye West, Nas, KRS-One and Rakim)	4:42
2.	"Classic (Better Than I've Ever Been - DJ Premier Remix) (Instrumental)"	4:42
Total length:		9:24

== Music video ==
The music video for the DJ Premier Remix of "Classic (Better Than I've Ever Been)" was released on March 29, 2007 and directed by Thibaut de Longeville.

== Samples ==
The original beat by Rick Rubin samples the song "Give Me the Night", performed by George Benson, off his Give Me the Night album.

DJ Premier's remix contains samples from "Dance the Kung-Fu" by Carl Douglas.
