= Alice Phoebe Lou =

South African musician (born 1993)

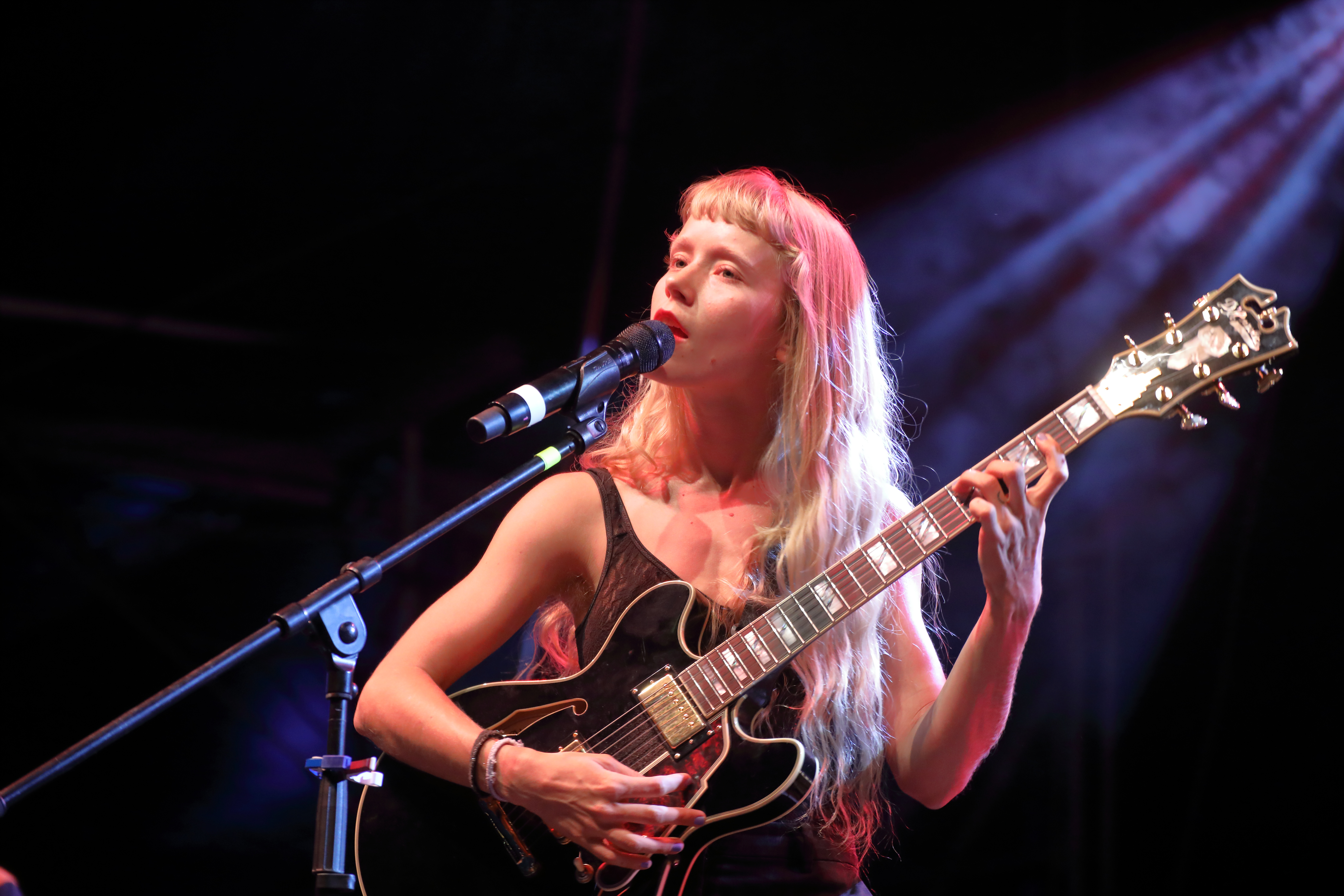
- Lou performing at the Rudolstadt-Festival 2019

Background information
- Born: Alice Matthew; 19 July 1993 (age 32); Kommetjie, Cape Town, South Africa
- Genres: Indie pop; indie folk
- Occupations: Musician; singer
- Instruments: Vocals; guitar; piano
- Years active: 2013–present
- Member of: Strongboi
- Website: alicephoebelou.com

Alice Phoebe Lou (born 19 July 1993) is a South African musician and singer. She has released six self-funded studio albums to date — Orbit (2016), Paper Castles (2019), Glow (2021), Child's Play (2021), Shelter (2023) and Oblivion (2025) — alongside two live albums, three EPs and various singles.

Since 2019, she has also been active in her side project, Strongboi, a duo which features the keyboardist from her band.

== Early life ==
Lou spent her childhood in Kommetjie on the west coast of the Cape Peninsula in South Africa and attended a Waldorf school. Her parents are documentary filmmakers, and she has two younger brothers who are twins. She took piano and guitar lessons as a child. When she was 14 years old, she became fond of trance music and started to take photographs at concerts, sometimes getting paid for them. In 2010, she spent her summer holiday in Paris. Living first with her aunt, Lou soon moved to live with a friend and began earning money by fire-dancing. She grew up listening to Jimi Hendrix, Joni Mitchell, Leonard Cohen, The Velvet Underground and Portishead. Prior to the COVID-19 pandemic, she would spend 4 months every year in South Africa visiting with family and friends. She has lived in Berlin, Germany, since she was 19 years old, and resides in the borough of Neukölln.

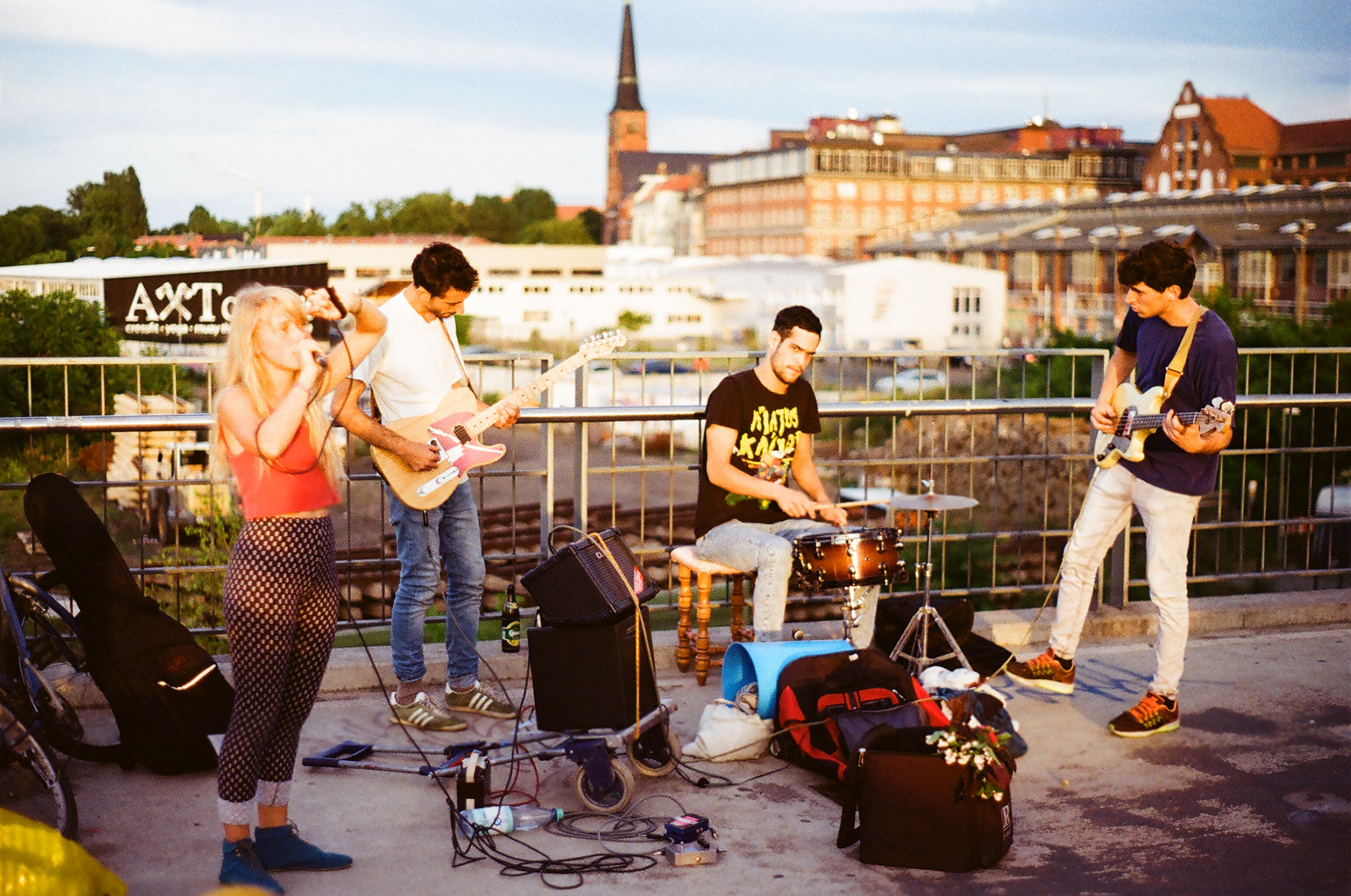
Alice Phoebe Lou performing with her band at Warschauer Straße Station, Berlin in 2016

== Career ==
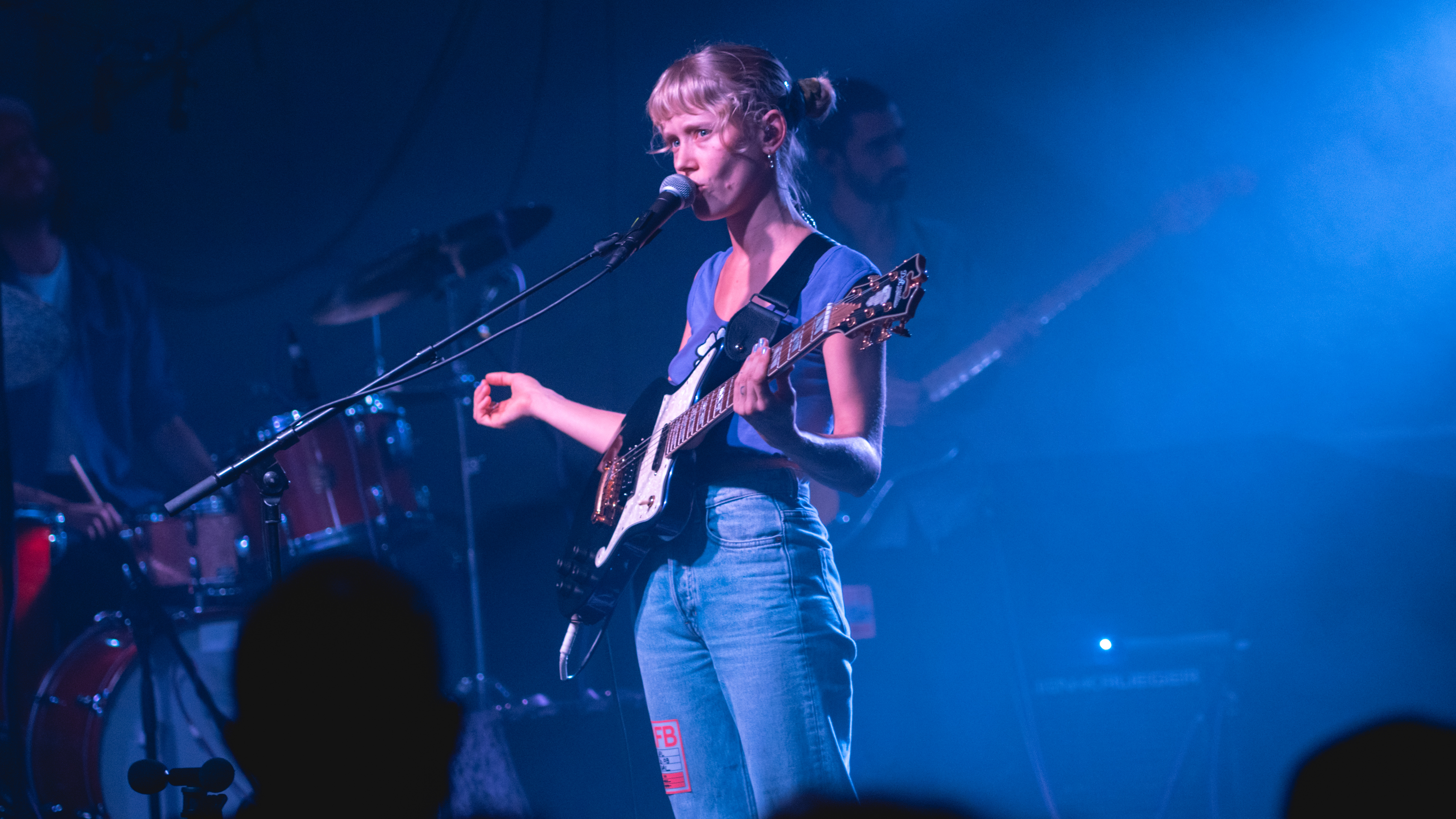
Alice Phoebe Lou at Oval Space, Thursday 30 September 2021

Lou took a gap year after graduating from high school in South Africa in 2012, settling in Europe—first in Amsterdam and then in Berlin. In Berlin, she started to sing and play guitar after finding it more lucrative than fire-dancing. Post-gap year, Lou contemplated attending university in South Africa, but eventually decided to purchase a battery powered amplifier and return to Berlin instead. In Berlin, she performed on S- and U-Bahn stations and in parks. After one month in Berlin, she played on a television programme. In April 2014 she self-released her first EP, Momentum. The song "Fiery Heart, Fiery Mind" from the EP featured in the soundtrack of the 2015 South African film Ayanda. During this time she also began to play venues.

After a performance at TEDx in Berlin on 6 September 2014, offers from record labels materialized, but Lou wanted to remain independent. In December 2014, she released a live album, Live at Grüner Salon, as a means of funding the recording of her debut studio album.

In 2015, Lou went on tour for the first time, performing also at SXSW in the USA. She returned to SXSW every year after that until 2019. She also performed at TEDGlobal London in 2015 and opened for Sixto Rodriguez on his 2016 South Africa tour.

In April 2016, Alice Phoebe Lou released her debut album Orbit, produced by Matteo Pavesi and Jian Kellett-Liew. She was nominated for best female artist at the 2016 Preis Für Popkultur (pop culture prize) in Germany and was invited to several German TV programs for interviews and performances. She toured in Europe, South Africa, and the USA in 2016 and played three sold-out shows at the Berlin Planetarium. All the while, she continued busking in Berlin.

In December 2017, she self-released the nine track EP, Sola, and a booklet of "poems, images, & memories" scanned from notebooks titled Songbook from Alice. That same month, it was announced that her song, "She," from the film, Bombshell: The Hedy Lamarr Story, was on the shortlist for an Academy Award in the category of Best Original Song. "She" was released as a digital single in 2018 with a music video directed by Natalia Bazina. In the 2018 edition of the Berlin Music Video Awards, Lou's music video ''She'' was nominated for Best Song. "She" also features significantly in two scenes of the German film Kokon, which was released on 21 February 2020 (When 'Nora' and 'Romy' are on the roof of a building, listening to music; and at the end, as 'Nora' finds her Caterpillar has metamorphosed into its adult form). Throughout 2018, Alice Phoebe Lou toured Europe, the US, South Africa, Japan, and Canada.

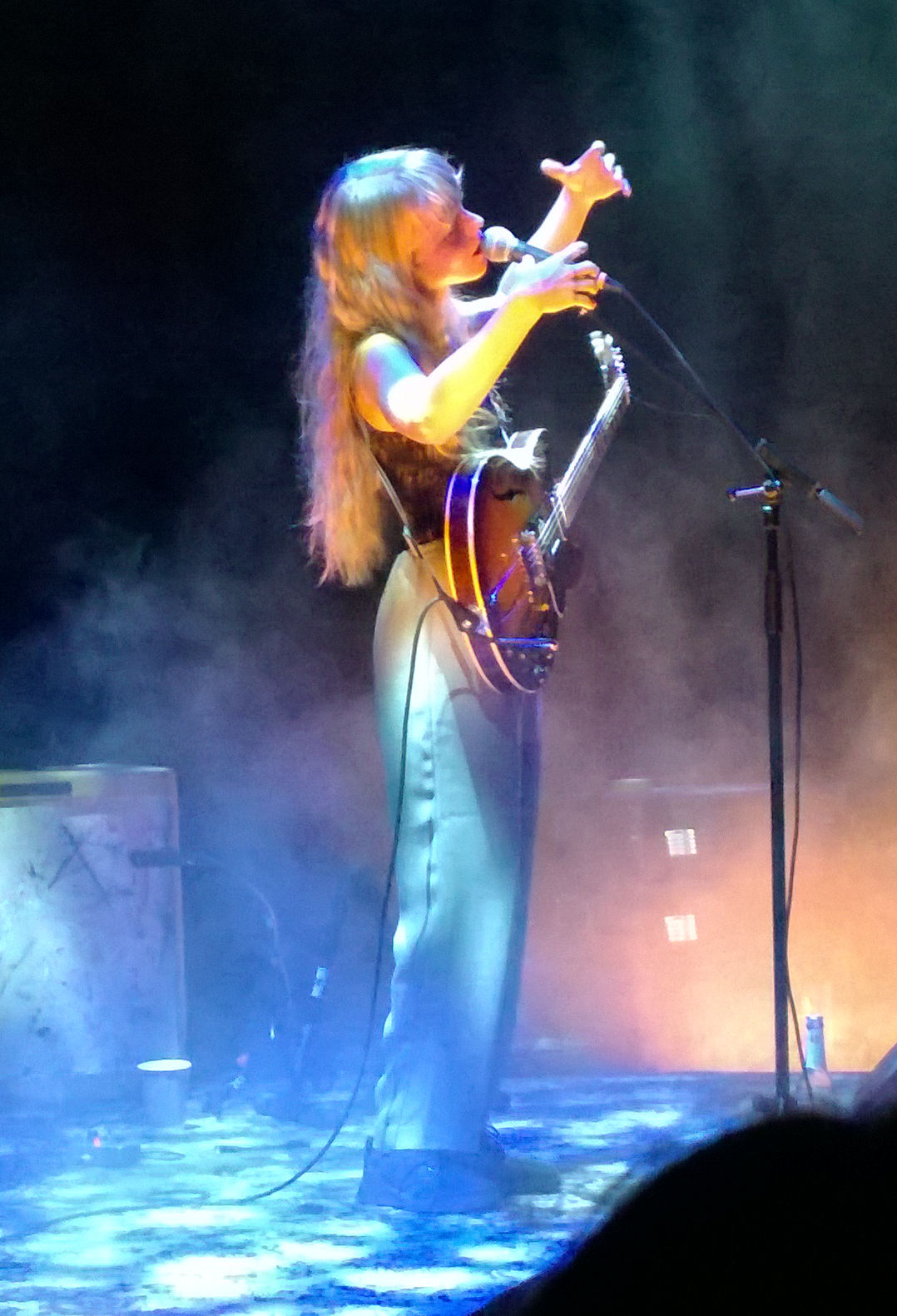
Alice Phoebe Lou at Funkhaus Berlin on 1 December 2018

The first single, "Something Holy", from her Paper Castles album was released on 30 November 2018. On 15 January 2019, the second single, "Skin Crawl", was released digitally. The video for "Skin Crawl" won third prize at the Berlin Music Video Awards in June, in the best concept category. On 15 February a third single, "Galaxies", was released and on 8 March 2019 the album was released.

In March 2019, Alice Phoebe Lou was the artist of the month for news outlet Consequence of Sound. On 6 May, the music video for "Galaxies" featuring Maisie Williams, filmed in the Zeiss Planetarium in Berlin, was released.

On 12 July the EP, A Place of My Own (Mahogany Sessions), containing four songs from Paper Castles recorded live, was released in digital format accompanied by a YouTube video of the recording session. On 7 August the video for Lost in LA from her Sola EP was published.

On 15 November Lou was interviewed by German TV network ZDF's program Aspekte and performed Paper Castles with her band.

In December, Paper Castles was listed at number 19 in the NBHAP magazine's 50 best albums of 2019 list and 7th in FMS magazine's top 35 albums and EPs of 2019 list.

Throughout 2019, Lou performed in over one hundred concerts in Europe, Japan, USA and Canada. For example, she performed on 30 May 2019 for the first time on the main stage of Primavera Sound Festival in Barcelona. Later that day she had another smaller concert at the OCB Paper Sessions stage. On 28 February 2020 German TV Bayerischer Rundfunk broadcast and streamed her PULS-festival concert recorded on 30 November 2019 in Munich. In spite of extensive touring, Lou still continued to perform on occasion in parks and U-Bahn stations in Berlin. In spring 2020 she had a short Europe tour and after that several streamed and broadcast concerts, for example on Arte.

On 13 March 2020, she released the single "Witches". The week before on 6 March, the self-titled video for "Strongboi" was released by her Strongboi side project with Ziv Yamin. The digital single of the song was released on 20 March. This was followed by Strongboi's digital single, "Honey Thighs", on 10 April and "Tuff Girl" on 7 August.

On 1 May she released the ten-track live album Live at Funkhaus from the December 2019 Funkhaus Berlin concert. Furthermore, a short documentary filmed and directed by Julian Culverhouse about the Paper Castles tour was published. On 26 June the single "Touch" was released. A purple 7-inch vinyl containing "Witches" and "Touch" was released on 18 September.

In November 2020 it was announced that her third studio album titled Glow would be released in March 2021. On 4 December the single and video for "Dusk" from the upcoming Glow album was released. On 10 December 2020, Alice Phoebe Lou covered Paul McCartney's unreleased track "Deep Deep Feeling" for McCartney's ’12 Days of Paul’ campaign. On 19 February 2021, a second single, "Dirty Mouth", was released from the upcoming album with a music video. Glow was released on 19 March 2021.

On 2 December 2021, she released the ten-track album Child's Play. The album was not announced in advance of its release.

On 25 February 2022, her side project Strongboi released the single "Fool Around," followed by two further singles, "Unconditional" and "Cold". Their debut album Strongboi was released on 17 February 2023.

She continued touring through the summer of 2022, and in autumn she had a North America tour supporting Billy Bragg. Touring continued in 2023 and on 10 March 2023 the title track "Shelter" from her coming album was released as a single in digital formats followed by a music video about one month later. The second single, "Open My Door", was released digitally on 28 April 2023 and the third one, "Lose My Head" on 2 June 2023. The Shelter album was released on 7 July 2023. November 10th, 2023 She performed three songs from Shelter on the non-commercial music platform Brodie Session.

In February and March 2026, Alice Phoebe Lou opened for Laufey on the European leg of her A Matter of Time Tour.

== Discography ==
=== Studio albums ===
Title	Album details
Orbit	Released: 2016; Label: self-released; Format: vinyl, CD
Paper Castles	Released: 8 March 2019; Label: self-released; Format: vinyl, CD; Paper Castles
Glow	Released: 19 March 2021; Label: self-released; Format: CD, digital download, streaming, vinyl
Child's Play	Released: 2 December 2021; Label: self-released; Format: CD, digital download, streaming, cassette, vinyl
Shelter	Released: 7 July 2023; Label: self-released; Format: CD, digital download, streaming, vinyl
Oblivion	Released: 24 October 2025; Label: Nettwerk; Format: CD, digital download, streaming, vinyl

=== Extended plays ===
Title	EP details
Momentum	Released: 2014; Label: self-released; self-made CDs were sold at performances, mp3 version has not been available after her website shop renewal in 2019
Sola	Released: 2017; Label: self-released; Format: 12 inch vinyl, mp3
A Place of My Own (Mahogany Sessions)	Released: 2019; Label: self-released; Format: digital download, streaming

=== Live albums ===
Title	Album details
Live at Grüner Salon	Released: 2014; Label: self-released; self-made CDs were sold at performances, mp3 version has not been available after her website shop renewal in 2019
Live at Funkhaus	Released: 1 May 2020; Label: self-released; Format: vinyl, digital download, streaming

=== Vinyl singles ===
- Something Holy (Single, 2018, 7 inch, instrumental version on B-side)
- Witches/Touch (Single, 2020, 7 inch vinyl and mp3/wav, double sided A single)
