= Immunity (Clairo album) =

Studio album by Clairo
- Released: August 2, 2019
- Studios: Truth & Echo Park Back House (Los Angeles, California); Bravo Ocean (Atlanta, Georgia)
- Genres: Soft rock; bedroom pop; electropop; indie pop
- Length: 40:39
- Label: Fader
- Producers: Rostam Batmanglij; Claire Cottrill

Clairo chronology
Diary 001 (2018)	Immunity (2019)	Sling (2021)

Singles from Immunity
- 1. "Bags" Released: May 24, 2019; 2. "Closer to You" Released: June 27, 2019; 3. "Sofia" Released: July 26, 2019

Immunity is the debut studio album by American singer-songwriter Clairo, released on August 2, 2019, by Fader Label. The album was co-produced by Clairo and Rostam Batmanglij, formerly of Vampire Weekend.

== Release and promotion ==
On May 24, 2019, Clairo released the lead single for her album, "Bags", and announced the album release for August. In September 2019, Clairo embarked on a North American tour playing 31 shows at venues such as Metro Chicago and Paradise Rock Club. The tour was supported by Beabadoobee and Hello Yello and ended in Boston in November 2019.

== Music ==
Immunity has been described as a soft rock, bedroom pop, electropop, and indie pop record.

== Critical reception ==
Professional ratings
Aggregate scores
Source	Rating
AnyDecentMusic?	7.0/10
Metacritic	76/100
Review scores
Source	Rating
AllMusic	3/5 stars
Consequence of Sound	B+
The Guardian	4/5 stars
NME	5/5 stars
The Observer	3/5 stars
Pitchfork	8.0/10
Q	4/5 stars
Rolling Stone	3.5/5 stars
Slant Magazine	4/5 stars
Uncut	4/10

Immunity received positive reviews from music critics. At Metacritic, which assigns a normalized rating out of 100 to reviews from mainstream publications, the album received an average score of 76, based on 20 reviews.

=== Accolades ===
At the end of 2019, Immunity appeared on a number of critics' lists ranking the year's top albums.

Publication	List	Rank	Ref.
Billboard	The 50 Best Albums of 2019	22	
Consequence of Sound	Top 50 Albums of 2019	45	
The Guardian	The 40 Best Albums of 2019	20	
Les Inrockuptibles	The 100 Best Albums of 2019	49	
Los Angeles Times	The 10 Best Albums of 2019	5	
NME	The 50 Best Albums of 2019	10	
Noisey	The 100 Best Albums of 2019	17	
Paper	Top 20 Albums of 2019	15	
Pitchfork	The 50 Best Albums of 2019	18	
PopCrush	The 25 Best Albums of 2019	—	
Slant	The 25 Best Albums of 2019	8	
Uproxx	The 50 Best Albums of 2019	28	
Uproxx	The 35 Best Pop Albums of 2019	8	

== Track listing ==
All tracks are written by Claire Cottrill except where noted.

No.	Title	Writer(s)	Producer(s)	Length
1.	"Alewife"		Rostam Batmanglij; Cottrill	3:33
2.	"Impossible"	Cottrill; Batmanglij	Batmanglij	3:50
3.	"Closer to You"	Cottrill; Batmanglij	Batmanglij	3:04
4.	"North"		Batmanglij; Cottrill; Peter Cottontale^{[a]}	3:33
5.	"Bags"		Batmanglij; Cottrill	4:20
6.	"Softly"	Cottrill; Batmanglij	Batmanglij	3:05
7.	"Sofia"	Cottrill; Batmanglij	Batmanglij	3:08
8.	"White Flag"		Batmanglij; Cottrill	3:01
9.	"Feel Something"		Batmanglij	2:57
10.	"Sinking"		Batmanglij; Cottrill	3:10
11.	"I Wouldn't Ask You"		Batmanglij; Cottrill; Cottontale^{[a]}; Burns Twins^{[a]}; Hayley Briasco^{[a]}	6:56
Total length:				40:39

Notes

- ^{^[a]} signifies an additional producer.

== Personnel ==
Musicians

- Claire Cottrill – lead vocals (all tracks), electric guitar (1, 4, 5, 8, 10), acoustic guitar (1, 5), drum programming (3–5, 10), piano (5, 8, 11), drum arrangement (5), guitar solo (7), synth (10)
- Rostam Batmanglij – synth (all tracks), bass (1, 2, 5–7, 10), piano (1, 2, 8, 9), drum programming (1, 3, 4, 6–11), electric guitar (2, 3, 5–7, 11), acoustic guitar (2, 9), harpsichord (2), synth bass (3), Mellotron (4), 808 bass (4, 8, 11), drum arrangement (5), organ (6, 10), synth programming (7), bass programming (9)
- Danielle Haim – drums (2, 5, 7), drum arrangement (5)
- Peter Cottontale – Wurlitzer (outro of 2), keyboard (4), drum programming (4), piano (6), choir arrangement (6)
- Nick Breton – drum arrangement (5)

The Adderly School Choir

- Janet Adderley – leading
- Ruby Nieman
- Olivia Bingham
- Hudson Marks
- Christopher van der Ohe
- Deia Campodonico
- Siena Fantini
- Hiro Phillips

Technical

- Rostam Batmanglij – recording engineering (all tracks), mixing (10, 11)
- Dalton Ricks – recording engineering (all tracks)
- Cary Singer – recording engineering (1, 2, 4, 5, 7–10)
- Michael Harris – recording engineering (2, 7)
- Nick Breton – recording engineering (4, 5, 8, 10, 11)
- Nate Head – recording engineering (7)
- Tom Elmhirst – mixing (1)
- Shawn Everett – mixing (2, 5, 6, 8, 9)
- Manny Marroquin – mixing (3)
- Dave Fridmann – mixing (4, 7)
- Mike Fridmann – mix engineering (4, 7)
- Emily Lazar – mastering
- Chris Allgood – mastering assistance

Artwork

- Hart Lëshkina – front and back cover photography
- Bijan Berahimi – graphic design
- Jimmy Bui – interior photography
- Mike Ahern – interior photography
- Brodie McCuskey – interior photography
- Angela Ricciardi – interior photography
- Nolan Feldpausch – interior photography
- Allie Cottrill – interior photography
- Cailin Hill Araki – interior photography
- Blake Wasson – interior photography

== Charts ==
Chart (2019)	Peak position
Australian Albums (ARIA)	73
Canadian Albums (Billboard)	79
France Downloads Albums (SNEP)	146
UK Download Albums (OCC)	90
US Billboard 200	51

== Certifications ==
Certifications for Immunity
Region	Certification	Certified units/sales
Canada (Music Canada)	Gold	40,000^{‡}
New Zealand (RMNZ)	Platinum	15,000^{‡}
United Kingdom (BPI)	Silver	60,000^{‡}
United States (RIAA)	Gold	500,000^{‡}
^{‡} Sales+streaming figures based on certification alone.
