= The Fader =

New York-based music magazine

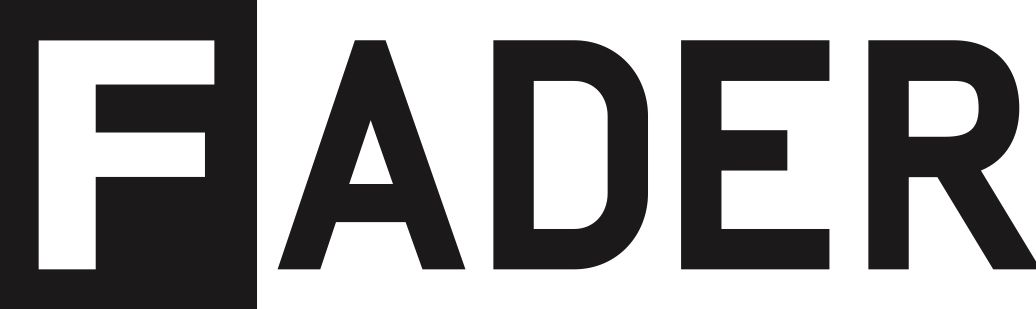
- Founder: Rob Stone; Jon Cohen
- First issue: Summer 1999
- Final issue Number: Winter 2019; 119
- Country: United States
- Based in: New York City
- Language: English
- Website: thefader.com
- ISSN: 1533-5194

The Fader is a magazine established in 1999 as an outlet for Cornerstone Agency, a marketing and public relations firm established by Rob Stone and Jon Cohen. The magazine covers music, style and culture.

== History and work ==
It is owned by The Fader Media group, which also includes its website, thefader.com, as well as Fader films, Fader Label and Fader TV. It was the first print publication to be released on iTunes.

=== The Fader Fort ===
The magazine hosted The Fader Fort, an annual invitation-only event at Austin, Texas's South by Southwest (SXSW). Since its founding in 2001, the four-day party features live performances. Fader Fort NYC is a party produced during the annual CMJ Music Marathon.

The festival has featured over 900 performances, including ones by Drake. In 2020, it moved to being an online event due to the coronavirus pandemic.

=== Charity ===
In 2023, the magazine announced FADER and Friends Vol. 1, a collection of 44 cover songs from 44 artists, to raise money for trans rights organisations.
