= Transcendence (Adil Omar album) =

Studio album by Adil Omar
- Released: July 8, 2018
- Recorded: 2017
- Studios: Bisonopolis, Islamabad
- Genres: Hip-Hop; psychedelic; industrial; pop; alternative hip hop; experimental hip-hop; rap rock; horrorcore; industrial hip-hop; hardcore hip hop; trip hop
- Length: 44:33
- Producers: Adil Omar; Talal Qureshi; SNKM; Shamoon Ismail; KFied

Adil Omar chronology
Margalla King (2016)	Transcendence (2018)	Mastery (2020)

Singles from Transcendence
- 1. "Champions"; 2. "We Need to Talk About Adil"; 3. "Revelations"

Transcendence (stylized as TRANSCENDENCE) is the debut studio album by Pakistani rapper-producer Adil Omar. It was released independently on July 8, 2018, with a film of the same title to accompany it.

The visual album was also directed by Adil Omar. The album was recorded in 2017 in Islamabad and features Elliphant, SNKM, Talal Qureshi and Tim Armstrong of Rancid. The album also included recreations of 1970's and 80's era Lollywood soundtracks, but rather than relying on sampling, Omar reached out to some of the original creators such as Ustad Tafu and M. Arshad and hosted live sessions in his home studio Bisonopolis, Islamabad.

The instrumental version of the album was released on October 8, 2018.

== Track listing ==
No.	Title	Writer(s)	Producer(s)	Length
1.	"Transcendence"	Adil Omar	Adil Omar	3:17
2.	"Champions"	Adil Omar	Adil Omar	3:22
3.	"The Great Receiver"	Adil Omar	Adil Omar, Shamoon Ismail	3:33
4.	"The Observer"	Adil Omar	Adil Omar	3:41
5.	"Testosterone Tears"	Adil Omar	Adil Omar	4:17
6.	"We Need to Talk About Adil"	Adil Omar	Adil Omar, Talal Qureshi	4:51
7.	"The Void"	Adil Omar	Adil Omar	6:19
8.	"Discovery" (featuring Talal Qureshi, Tim Armstrong of Rancid)	Adil Omar, Talal Qureshi, Tim Armstrong	Adil Omar, Talal Qureshi	4:24
9.	"Revelations" (featuring Elliphant, Shaman Durek, SNKM)	Adil Omar, Ellinor Olovsdotter, Talal Qureshi, Durek Verrett	SNKM, Adil Omar, Talal Qureshi	4:18
10.	"Searching For Salim Omar"	Adil Omar	Adil Omar, KFied	6:39
Total length:				44:33

== Personnel ==
- Adil Omar - rapping, songwriting, production, vocals, lyrics, keyboards, mixing, mastering, engineering: all tracks
- Talal Qureshi - co-production, keyboards: track 6, 8 and 9; mixing, engineering: track 2; guest vocals: track 9
- Shamoon Ismail - co-production: track 3
- Ustad Tafu - harmonium, tabla: track 6; additional arrangement, percussion: track 8
- Tim Armstrong - guitars: track 10
- Ellinor Olovsdotter - guest vocals, lyrics: track 9
- Hannu "KFied" Makela: co-production, guitar: track 10
- M. Arshad - additional arrangement: tracks 1, 2, 4, 5, 7, 9
- Durran Amin - additional keyboards: tracks 1, 2, 3, 4, 5, 6, 7, 8, 10
- Ali Haider Tipu - additional keyboards: tracks 1, 2, 4, 5, 6, 7, 9
- Saim "Psyme" Salahuddin - guitars: tracks 1, 5, 7, 9
- Zain Ali - guitars: track 5
- Durek Verrett - guest vocals, lyrics: track 9; additional vocals: track 7
- Seth Drake - mastering: all tracks
- Nicki Adamsson - engineering, vocal mixing: track 9
- Komail Aijazuddin - album artwork

== Interpolations ==
- "Transcendence" contains an interpolation of "O My Love I Promise You" by M. Ashraf featuring Nahid Akhtar, from the 1977 film Sham-e-Mohabbat
- "Champions" contains an interpolation of "Cocktail" by M. Arshad, from the 1990 self titled album M. Arshad
- "The Observer" contains interpolations of "I Am Very Sorry" by Kamal Ahmed featuring Noor Jehan, from the 1976 film Warrant, and "Dil Kare Kukrroo Karroo" by M. Arshad (1990)
- "Testosterone Tears" contains an interpolation of "Main Hoon Play Boy" by M. Ashraf featuring A. Nayyar, from the 1978 film Playboy
- "We Need to Talk About Adil" contains an interpolation of "Kad Ley Way" by Ustad Tafu featuring Nahid Akhtar, from the 1976 film Aj Da Badmash
- "The Void" contains an interpolation of "Life Hai Kuch Dinon Ki" by M. Ashraf featuring Nahid Akhtar, from the 1978 film Playboy
- "Discovery" contains an interpolation of "Na Main Chini Na Japani" by Ustad Tafu featuring Nahid Akhtar, from the 1980 film Des Pardes
- "Revelations" contains an interpolation of "Disco Deewani Mera Naam" by M. Ashraf and Nahid Akhtar, from the 1983 film Eik Din Bahu Ka
