= Diary 001 =

2018 EP by Clairo

EP by Clairo
- Released: May 25, 2018
- Genres: Indie pop; lo-fi; R&B; bedroom pop
- Length: 14:43
- Label: Fader Label
- Producers: Clairo; Danny L Harle; Eddie Burns; Isaac Burns; Ashwin Torke; Deaton Anthony

Clairo chronology
Claire Cottrill / Keel Her (2016)	Diary 001 (2018)	Immunity (2019)

Singles from Diary 001
- 1. "Flaming Hot Cheetos" Released: June 14, 2017; 2. "Pretty Girl" Released: August 4, 2017; 3. "4Ever (Note: Stylized in all caps)" Released: April 27, 2018

Diary 001 is the solo debut studio extended play by American singer-songwriter Clairo. It is her twelfth extended play overall, following several demos and collaborative releases under the name Claire Cottrill. The EP was released on May 25, 2018 through Fader Label.

== Background ==
Clairo began her career in 2014 with the demo EP Do U Wanna Fall in Love?, released through Bandcamp under her legal name Claire Cottrill. Over the following years, she released eight more demo EPs and two collaborative EPs.

After signing with Fader Label in 2017, she released the indie pop single "Flaming Hot Cheetos", her first release under the new name Clairo. The single was followed by "Pretty Girl", whose music video which went viral on social media. The video was filmed entirely in Clairo's bedroom in Carlisle, Massachusetts, and its success caused major labels, including Capitol, Columbia and RCA to gain interest in her. "4EVER" was released as the EP's final single in April 2018.

== Promotion ==
In support of the EP, Clairo performed as an opening act for English-Albanian singer Dua Lipa in 2018, during the Self-Titled Tour. She also performed her own tour the same year, dubbed the Lazy Days Tour.

Some Reddit users accused Clairo of using her ties in the music industry to promote the release, resulting in an inorganic success. Many claimants labeled her an "industry plant" and brought up the idea that her father may have boosted the release due to his affiliations in the industry. In response to the claims, Clairo said "The fact that there has to be a man behind my success when I genuinely have worked so hard is frustrating," implying that the claims are sexist. She told the New York Times "No, I just have representation, like every single other artist you listen to."

== Critical reception ==
Professional ratings
Review scores
Source	Rating
Pitchfork	7.0/10

The EP received a positive review of 7.0/10 from Pitchfork, with Sasha Geffen praising Clairo's "careful songwriting" and noting that "[s]he has worked hard to make it sound this easy".

== Track listing ==
All lyrics are written by Claire Cottrill except where noted.

Diary 001 track listing
No.	Title	Lyrics	Music	Production	Length
1.	"Hello?" (featuring Rejjie Snow)	Claire Cottrill; Snow	Cottrill	Cottrill	2:15
2.	"Flaming Hot Cheetos"		Cottrill	Cottrill	2:02
3.	"B.O.M.D." (featuring Danny L Harle)		Isaac Burns; Cottrill; Harle	Cottrill; Harle	2:39
4.	"4Ever"		Deaton Chris Anthony; Eddie Burns; Isaac Burns; Cottrill; Ashwin Torke	Anthony; Burns; Burns; Cottrill; Torke	2:39
5.	"Pretty Girl"		Cottrill	Cottrill	2:59
6.	"How" (demo)		Cottrill	Cottrill	2:07
Total length:					14:43

== Certifications ==
Certifications for Diary 001
Region	Certification	Certified units/sales
United Kingdom (BPI)	Silver	60,000^{‡}
United States (RIAA)	Gold	500,000^{‡}
^{‡} Sales+streaming figures based on certification alone.

== Release history ==
Release history and formats for Diary 001
Country	Date	Format	Ref.
Various	May 25, 2018	Digital download; streaming	
United States	August 10, 2018	LP vinyl	
