= Takatak (disambiguation) =

Takatak is a Pakistani rock music group.

Takatak may also refer to:

- Takatak (film), a 2019 Indian film
  - Takatak 2, a 2022 Indian film, its sequel
- MX TakaTak, an Indian video sharing app
