= Biryani Brothers =

Pakistani pop music band

- Origin: Lahore, Pakistan
- Genres: Pop
- Years active: 2014–present
- Members: Natasha Noorani (vocals); Zahra Paracha (guitar)

Biryani Brothers is a Pakistani pop music duo formed in Lahore in early 2014 by Natasha Noorani (vocals) and Zahra Paracha (guitar). They primarily perform covers of Eastern and Western songs.

== History ==
Both women are graduates of Lahore University of Management Sciences (LUMS). Noorani earned a degree in political science and Paracha in sociology-anthropology. They are active contributors to the music society of LUMS. They are the founders of Lahore Music Meet, a music festival held in Lahore each year.

Biryani Brothers have performed at gigs in restaurants and cafes around Lahore. Their first music video was titled "Ikisvi Sadi" which translates to "21st Century", and was directed by Tabish Habib and released in 2018. It pays homage to vintage Pakistani advertisements and television networks. Their second music "Sab Theek Ho Jaye Ga" was released in April 2019. Biryani Brothers have made a cover song of ‘Thinking Heart’ by Poor Rich Boy, a local music band formed by Zain Ahsan and Umer Khan.

Noorani released the single "TRACE" in 2018 featuring Shorbanoor, a Lahore-based songwriter.
