= Talal Qureshi =

Pakistani makeup artist (born 1988)

Talal Qureshi طلال قریشی
- Born: Talal Qureshi; 2 April 1988 (age 38); Riyadh, Saudi Arabia
- Origin: Pakistan
- Genres: Electronic music, Pop music, Hip hop music, Ambient music
- Occupations: Electronic musician, music producer, Record producer Singer-Songwriter
- Instrument: Multi-instrumentalist
- Years active: 2005–present

Talal Qureshi (born 2 April 1988) is a Pakistani record producer, singer, songwriter, actor, director and makeup artist.

== Early life ==
Qureshi was born and raised in Riyadh, Saudi Arabia, the youngest of six siblings. He came across the video game MTV Music Generator on PlayStation, which pushed him to start writing music at the age of 13. Later, his family moved to Karachi, Pakistan.

== Career ==
=== Career beginnings (2007-2017) ===
He released his first single, "Phase Shift", in 2007. In 2012, he released his debut EP, Equator.

In 2013, he released his second EP, x1988.

In 2014, Qureshi released the single "Too Much To Handle" and his remix of Mooroo's "Tasveer".

In 2015, Qureshi formed SNKM with Adil Omar and the duo released "Nighat & Paras", played at SXSW and various cities in the US and then collaborated and performed with Diplo and Elliphant for their first ever Pakistan show in 2016.

SNKM debuted at Mad Decent Block Party 2016 alongside Diplo, Kesha, Marshmello and others and continued to play shows through until 2018 with Major Lazer, Skrillex and others.

Qureshi also produced a new single with Faris Shafi titled "Jawab De", a socially conscious rap song that focuses on the issues of military overreach, religious extremism, patriarchy and their resulting consequences of violence against disenfranchised civilians, minorities and women in Pakistan. The resulting controversy caused the song to be censored on media, despite receiving positive reviews.

=== Breakthrough (2018-present) ===
In 2018, Qureshi released the single "AAG" with Punjabi folk singer Naseebo Lal. The track was featured in the Ms. Marvel episode "Seeing Red" in 2022.

Qureshi has also appeared on BBC live sessions, featuring Faris Shafi.

In 2019, Qureshi released "Mad Calls" with California based singer Rehma.

In 2020, Qureshi released his single featuring Natasha Noorani. He also released two EPs, Acha Vol.1 and Vol.2.

In 2020, Qureshi released LSD featuring Shamsher Rana.

He released the single "PAISA" featuring R&B singer/songwriter Hasan Raheem. The music video was created by Arham Ikram and RohanYV.

In 2023, he released the album TURBO. For the album he collaborated with Indian musicians, Mitika Kanwar (for songs ‘Aya’, ‘Chayn’ and ‘Dunya’) and rapper Yashraj.

== Discography ==
=== Album ===
- TURBO (2023)

=== EPs ===
- Equator (2012)
- x1988 (2013)
- Castle Of Hybrid Senses (2019)
- ACHA Vol.1 (2020)
- ACHA Vol.2 (2020)

=== Singles ===
- 2023: Asal G with Seedhe Maut, Faris Shafi
- 2023: DIL with Mitika Kanwar
- 2023: JADU with Towers
- 2022: Next 11 - Pakistan Junior League Official Anthem 2022 with Young Stunners & Justin Bibis
- 2022: Vitamin D with Faris Shafi
- 2022: HUM with Faris Shafi
- 2022: Faltu Pyar with Hasan Raheem & Natasha Noorani
- 2022: Peechay Hutt with Hasan Raheem & Justin Bibis
- 2022: SHAAM with Maanu, Towers & Mujju
- 2022: Flash Your Bones, Takatak & Natasha Noorani
- 2021: Cricket Khidaiye with Atif Aslam & Faris Shafi
- 2021: SWEETU with Hasan Raheem & Maanu
- 2021: HICO with Maanu
- 2021: 5 AM with Maanu
- 2021: PAISA feat. Hasan Raheem
- 2020: LSD with Shamsher Rana
- 2020: Constant Summer feat. Natasha Noorani
- 2020: Nobody Predicted the Galaxy Would Be So Lonely
- 2020: Frequency
- 2020: All The Flavors You've Been Missing
- 2019: Mad Calls with REHMA
- 2019: Natural
- 2019: Owww
- 2018: Talal Qureshi feat. Naseebo Lal – Aag
- 2017: After Party (feat. REHMA)
- 2017: Coconut Paradise

=== Producer ===
- 2025: "PSA", "Paracetamol", Yashraj
- 2023: "Matlabi", Natasha Noorani
- 2022: "Peeche Hut", Hasan Raheem, Talal Qureshi, Justin Bibis (Coke Studio Pakistan)
- 2022: "Cricket Khidaiye", Atif Aslam, Talal Qureshi, Faris Shafi
- 2022: "HUM", Faris Shafi
- 2022: "Laiyan", Natasha Noorani
- 2022: "LOONY", Maanu (with Abdullah Siddiqui)
- 2019: "Automatic Yellow", Rutaba Yaqub
