= Natasha Noorani =

Pakistani musician and ethnomusicologist

Natasha Noorani نتاشہ نورانی
- Born: Lahore, Pakistan
- Genres: R&B; progressive rock; neo-soul; Lollywood pop
- Occupations: Musician; singer; songwriter; playback singer; voice-over artist; ethnomusicologist
- Years active: 2014–present
- Formerly of: Biryani Brothers

Natasha Noorani (Urdu: نتاشا نورانی) is a Pakistani musician, singer, songwriter, playback singer, voice-over artist, and ethnomusicologist. She is the co-founder and festival director of Lahore Music Meet (LMM). She is known for her "Lolly-Pop" style, which is a combination of retro subcontinental and electronic pop music. Natasha has also performed at Boiler Room's first-ever Pakistan edition.

== Early life and education ==
Noorani has been passionate about music from a young age, coming from a musically inclined family. She has a BSc in Political Science from Lahore University of Management Sciences (LUMS) and an MMus degree in Ethnomusicology from SOAS University of London. Natasha was the only Pakistani to be awarded the Goethe Talents Scholarship in 2019.

== Career ==
Natasha began formally began her music career in 2014 as a part of the duo indie band, Biryani Brothers. Her debut EP Munaasib, was noted by the indie music scene prior to her receiving the Goethe Talents Scholarship. She was launched into mainstream music in 2019 with her first Velo Sound Station single "Baby Baby", made in collaboration with Bilal Maqsood. Noorani's first song from her debut album RONAQ called "Choro" was one of the most played songs on CityFM89 in 2021. She has been an ambassador for Spotify's EQUAL Pakistan campaign.

Noorani has experimented with various genres including R&B, progressive rock, neo-soul and Lollywood pop. She has been trained in khyal gayaki by the Pakistani qawwal and Sufi singer, Akbar Ali. Her collaborations are with versatile artists such as Hasan Raheem, Abdullah Siddiqui, Takatak, Talal Qureshi, Sikandar Ka Mandar, Shorbanoor, and Strings.

Additionally, she has experience as both a playback singer and voice-over artist. Noorani has also recorded soundtracks for local films such as Baaji (2019) and Chalay Thay Saath (2017).

She has received UNESCO recognition as a Creative Entrepreneur and actively serves as a consultant for diverse cultural projects, including the British Council Pakistan and Music Connect Asia. Noorani has also been a promoter of local talent via curating music for various entities such as NTS. She has also curated the 2020 and 2021 Pakistan Super League (PSL) anthems and Coke Studio Season 14. In Coke Studio Season 10, she held the position of General Manager. This led to her managing Strings, overseeing the release of their album 30. In addition to her various endeavors, she has worked as a Marketing Executive at CityFM89 radio station.

Peshkash, the brainchild of Noorani, is a notable undertaking that seeks to archive and promote 20th century Pakistani music. Insights derived from her archival work have found publication in Dawn and Herald.

Her social work also includes creating a song "Pyaar Banto" for Down Syndrome awareness in collaboration with Ali Hamza, Nafisa Khalid, Bilal Ali, and Haroon Shahid.

== Discography ==
=== Singles and collaborations ===
Year	Track Name	Artist(s)
2017	Maladaptive	Gentle Robot, Natasha Noorani
2017	Prognosis	Ali Suhail, Natasha Noorani
2018	Ikisvi Sadi	Natasha Noorani, Zahra Paracha
2019	Sab Theek Ho Jaye Ga	Natasha Noorani, Zahra Paracha
2020	Constant Summer	Natasha Noorani, Talal Qureshi
2020	Baby Baby	Natasha Noorani
2020	Hum Dono	Natasha Noorani, Strings
2020	Frontline	Abdullah Siddiqui, Natasha Noorani
2020	Trace	Natasha Noorani, Shorbanoor
2021	Saazishen	KiliHippie, Natasha Noorani
2021	Choro	Natasha Noorani, Abdullah Siddiqui
2022	Flash Your Bones	Takatak, Natasha Noorani, Talal Qureshi
2022	Faltu Pyaar	Hasan Raheem, Natasha Noorani
2022	Bojh	Nadir Shahzad, Natasha Noorani
2022	Pyaar Banto	Natasha Noorani, Ali Hamza, Nafisa Khalid, Bilal Ali, Haroon Shahid
2023	Chamkeela	Natasha Noorani
2023	Phoolon Ki Rani	Talal Qureshi, Natasha Noorani, Maanu
2023	Jaan Meri	Talal Qureshi, Natasha Noorani

=== Lollywood ===
Year	Film	Track Name	Artist(s)
2017	Chalay Thay Saath	Bolo	Sikandar Ka Mandar, Natasha Noorani
2019	Baaji	Ye Aaj Mujh Ko Kya Hua	Jamal Rahman, Natasha Noorani, Aima Baig

=== EPs ===
Year	EP	Track name	Artist(s)
2018	Munaasib	To Get Her	Natasha Noorani
2018	Munaasib	Fever Dream	Natasha Noorani
2018	Munaasib	Apocalypse How?	Natasha Noorani
2018	Munaasib	Work	Natasha Noorani
2018	Munaasib	Occupy	Natasha Noorani

=== Studio album ===
Year	Album	Track name	Artist(s)
2023	RONAQ	Haan, I know	Natasha Noorani, Talal Qureshi
2023	RONAQ	Choro	Natasha Noorani, Abdullah Siddiqui
2023	RONAQ	Thandi	Natasha Noorani, Talal Qureshi
2023	RONAQ	Raazi	Natasha Noorani, Talal Qureshi
2023	RONAQ	Call Me	Natasha Noorani, Talal Qureshi, Annural Khalid
2023	RONAQ	Matlabi	Natasha Noorani, Talal Qureshi
2023	RONAQ	Baaz	Natasha Noorani, Abdullah Siddiqui
2023	RONAQ	Laiyan	Natasha Noorani, Talal Qureshi
2023	RONAQ	Frendz	Natasha Noorani, Talal Qureshi
