= The Mushroom Cloud Effect =

Mixtape by Adil Omar
- Released: March 22, 2013
- Recorded: 2010–2012
- Genre: Hip hop, hardcore rap, experimental hip hop
- Label: Digital release
- Producer: Fredwreck, KFied, DJ Lethal, Talal Qureshi, Apathy, DJ Solo, Rubee Jawbotik, Traumah, G Rocka, Charlie Patierno

Adil Omar chronology
The Mushroom Cloud Effect (2013)	Margalla King (2016)

The Mushroom Cloud Effect is a street album by Pakistani hip-hop artist Adil Omar consisting of compiled tracks and previously unheard demos. It was released digitally on March 22, 2013 and features Omar's early underground work (mostly affiliated with Soul Assassins) performing on other producer's tracks as opposed to self produced material.

== Track listing ==
#	Title	Producer(s)
1	"The Mushroom Cloud Effect"	Charlie Patierno
2	"50 Feet Tall" (featuring Hard Target)	Rubee Jawbotik
3	"Paki Rambo"	DJ Solo
4	"Go Outside"	Apathy
5	"Broken Man"	KFied
6	"One by One" (featuring B-Real, Sick Jacken and Demrick)	Traumah, G Rocka
7	"Star Power"	Talal Qureshi
8	"Off The Handle" (featuring Xzibit)	Fredwreck
9	"Sugar Low"	KFied, Talal Qureshi
10	"Carry Me Home"	DJ Lethal, Franko Carino, Bilal Iftikhar
11	"Heart of Darkness"	DJ Lethal
12	"Summertime" (featuring Kool G Rap, Gravity and Greydon Square)	Traumah, G Rocka
13	"Hand Over Your Guns" (featuring Everlast)	KFied, Rubee Jawbotik
