= Living Life Golden =

Studio album by Elliphant
- Released: 25 March 2016
- Recorded: 2014–15
- Length: 42:05
- Labels: TEN; Kemosabe
- Producers: Billboard; Cirkut; Diplo; Dr. Luke; Faux Delorean; Jr Blender; Joel Little; Carl Löf; Pfannenstill; Nick Ruth; Dave Sitek; Skrillex; T-Collar; Tommy Tysper

Elliphant chronology
One More (2014)	Living Life Golden (2016)	Rocking Horse (2021)

Singles from Living Life Golden
- 1. "Love Me Badder" Released: 12 May 2015; 2. "Step Down" Released: 18 December 2015; 3. "Spoon Me" Released: 24 February 2016; 4. "Where Is Home" Released: 6 May 2016

Living Life Golden is the second studio album by Swedish singer Elliphant, released on 25 March 2016 by TEN Music Group and Kemosabe Records. The album was previously scheduled to be released on 25 September 2015.

== Track listing ==
No.	Title	Writer(s)	Producer(s)	Length
1.	"Step Down"	Ellinor Olovsdotter; Joel Little	Little	3:18
2.	"Everybody" (featuring Azealia Banks)	Olovsdotter; Azealia Banks; Theron Thomas; Henry Walter; Lukasz Gottwald	Dr. Luke; Cirkut	4:06
3.	"Love Me Badder"	Olovsdotter; Gottwald; Thomas; Tommy Tysper; Walter	Dr. Luke; Cirkut; Tysper	3:54
4.	"Not Ready"	Olovsdotter; Saul Alexander Castillo Vasquez (A.C); Billboard	Billboard; A.C	3:51
5.	"Love Me Long" (featuring Major Lazer and Gyptian)	Olovsdotter; Windel Beneto Edwards; Andy Price; Erik Hassle; Thomas Pentz; Jr Blender	Diplo; Jr Blender; Pfannenstill	3:24
6.	"Hit and Run"	Olovsdotter; Matthew Burns	Burns	3:40
7.	"Thing Called Life"	Olovsdotter; Tinashe Sibanda (T-Collar); Nick Ruth; Taps Mugadza; Tysper	Ruth; T-Collar; Faux Delorean^{[a]}; Tysper^{[a]}	3:46
8.	"Where Is Home" (featuring Twin Shadow)	Olovsdotter; George Lewis Jr.; Little	Little	3:20
9.	"One More" (featuring MØ)	Olovsdotter; Karen Marie Ørsted; Little	Little	3:27
10.	"Player Run"	Olovsdotter; Carl Löf; Tysper	Löf; Tysper	2:51
11.	"Spoon Me" (featuring Skrillex)	Olovsdotter; Sonny Moore; Tysper	Skrillex; Tysper	3:43
12.	"Living Life Golden"	Olovsdotter; Dave Sitek	Sitek	2:45
Total length:				42:05

Notes

- ^{^a} signifies a co-producer

== Charts ==
Chart (2016)	Peak position
Australian Albums (ARIA)	76
Swedish Albums (Sverigetopplistan)	50
