= Typical Music =

Studio album by Tim Burgess
- Released: 23 September 2022
- Studio: Rockfield Studios
- Length: 1:28:10
- Label: Bella Union

Tim Burgess chronology
I Love the New Sky (2020)	Typical Music (2022)

Singles from Typical Music
- 1. "Here Comes the Weekend" Released: 14 April 2022; 2. "Typical Music" Released: 6 June 2022; 3. "Sure Enough" Released: 23 August 2022

Professional ratings
Aggregate scores
Source	Rating
Metacritic	78/100
Review scores
Source	Rating
AllMusic	4/5 stars
Clash	8/10
The Guardian	4/5 stars
Mojo	4/5 stars
MusicOMH	4.5/5 stars
NME	3/5 stars
The Observer	3/5 stars
PopMatters	7/10

Typical Music is the sixth studio album by English musician and lead vocalist of The Charlatans Tim Burgess. It was released on 23 September 2022 by Bella Union.

The album has produced singles such as "Here Comes the Weekend", "Typical Music" and "Sure Enough"

== Background ==
On 14 April 2022, Tim Burgess released the first single "Here Comes The Weekend", with the music video being directed by Kevin Godley.

Burgess announced the release of the new double album on 6 June 2022, along with the title track "Typical Music". When discussing the album, Burgess said:

"I wanted to give people everything that I’d done. And everything that I brought to the studio and worked on with the guys, I coloured them all in equally. Every idea was treated as if it was the best thing and had to be treated with extreme care. I wanted to give everything of myself"

The third single "Sure Enough" was released on 23 August 2022.

== Critical reception ==
Typical Music was met with "generally favorable" reviews from critics. At Metacritic, which assigns a weighted average rating out of 100 to reviews from mainstream publications, this release received an average score of 78, based on 10 reviews.

Writing for The Guardian, Dave Simpson wrote: "Typical Music features Sparks-ish electronic pop, sumptuous arrangements and, on the title track, modern psychedelia. The lyrics are either endearingly gauche or deeply meaningful."

=== Accolades ===
Publications' year-end list appearances for Typical Music
Critic/Publication	List	Rank	Ref
MusicOMH	MusicOMH's Top 50 Albums of 2022	49	

== Track listing ==
Disc One
No.	Title	Length
1.	"Here Comes the Weekend"	4:35
2.	"Curiosity"	3:10
3.	"Time That We Call Time"	3:45
4.	"Flamingo"	3:20
5.	"Revenge Through Art"	2:13
6.	"Kinectic Connection"	3:40
7.	"Typical Music"	3:03
8.	"Take Me With You"	2:24
9.	"After This"	4:24
10.	"The Centre of Me (Is a Symphony of You)"	4:23
11.	"When I See You"	6:58

Disc Two
No.	Title	Length
1.	"Magic Rising"	4:56
2.	"Tender Hooks"	3:30
3.	"L.O.S.T Lost/Will You Take a Look at My Hand Please"	7:10
4.	"A Bloody Nose"	3:20
5.	"In May"	3:05
6.	"Slacker (Than I've Ever Been)"	4:10
7.	"View From Above"	5:09
8.	"A Quarter to Eight"	3:57
9.	"Sooner Than Yesterday"	2:44
10.	"Sure Enough"	3:26
11.	"What's Meant for You Won't Pass by You"	4:48

== Charts ==
Chart performance for Typical Music
Chart (2022)	Peak position
Scottish Albums (OCC)	18
UK Albums (OCC)	90
UK Independent Albums (OCC)	7
