= One More (song) =

Single by Elliphant featuring MØ

from the EP One More
- Released: 22 September 2014
- Recorded: 2013
- Length: 3:28
- Label: TEN; Kemosabe
- Songwriters: Karen Marie Ørsted; Ellinor Olovsdotter; Joel Little
- Producer: Joel Little

Elliphant singles chronology
| "Could It Be" (2013) | "One More" (2014) | "Never Been in Love" (2015) |

MØ singles chronology
| "Walk This Way" (2014) | "One More" (2014) | "Beg for It" (2014) |

Music video
- "One More" on YouTube

"One More" is a song by Swedish singer Elliphant featuring Danish singer and songwriter MØ. It was released through TEN Music Group and Kemosabe Records on 22 September 2014 as the lead single from her third extended play of the same name (2014). It was later included on her second studio album Living Life Golden (2016).

== Track listing ==
Digital download
| No. | Title | Length |
|---|---|---|
| 1. | "One More" (feat. MØ) | 3:28 |

== Charts ==
Chart performance for "One More"
| Chart (2014) | Peak position |
|---|---|
| Belgium (Ultratip Flanders) | 56 |

== Release history ==
| Region | Date | Format | Label | Ref. |
|---|---|---|---|---|
| Denmark | 22 September 2014 | Digital download | TEN; Kemosabe | |
