= Keel Her =

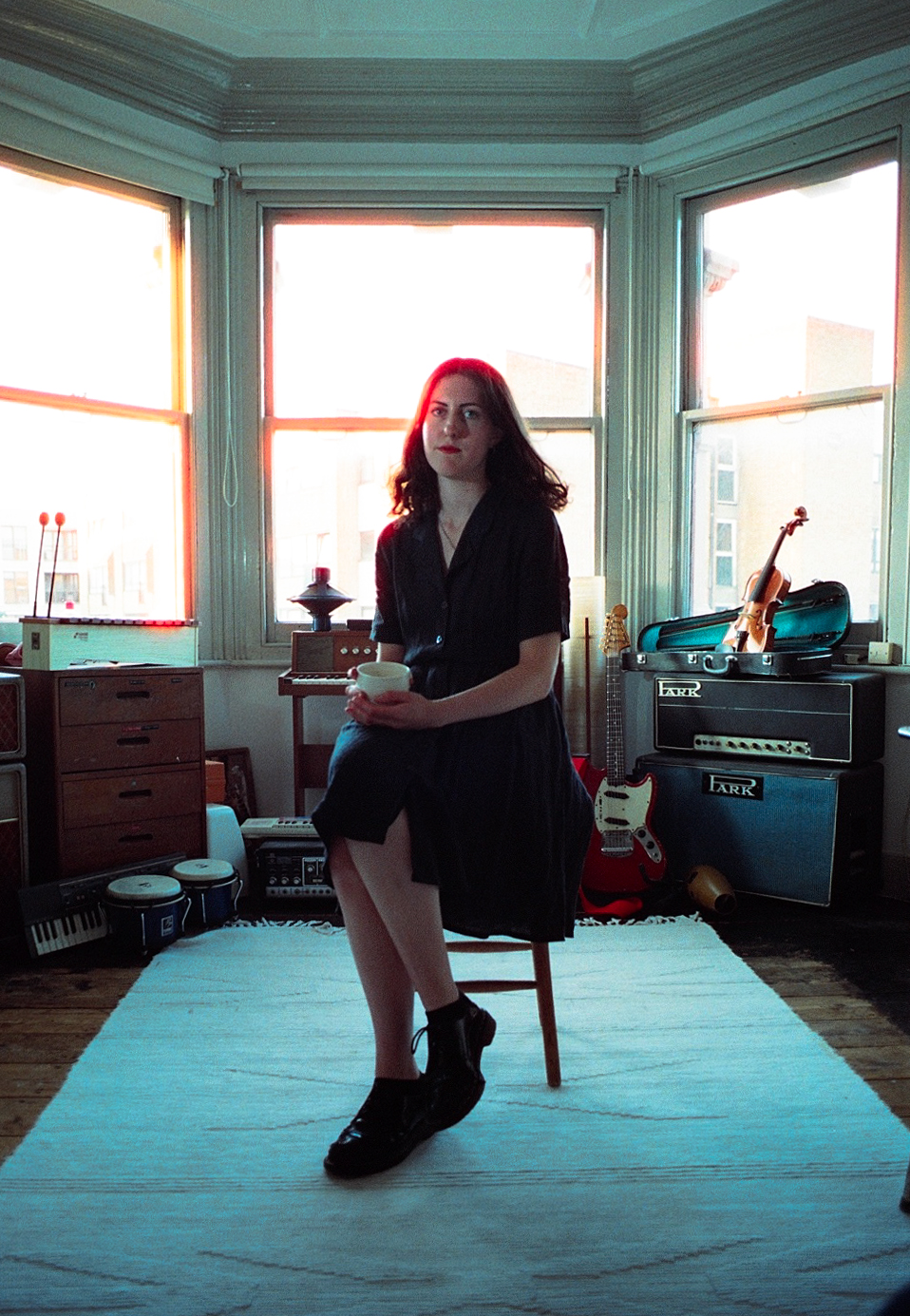

Background information
- Born: 4 June 1993 (age 33)
- Genres: Indie, electronic, avant-garde, synthpop
- Occupations: Songwriter; musician; producer
- Instruments: Vocals, keyboards, guitar, electric bass, violin
- Years active: 2009–present
- Labels: Critical Heights (Fire Records), O Genesis Recordings, Gnar Tapes
- Website: ogenesisrecordings.com/keel-her/

Keel Her is the musical recording project of English musician Rose Keeler-Schaffeler. She is originally from Winchester and currently resides in London. Keeler-Schaffeler began writing and recording "bedroom music" in 2007 for therapeutic reasons. As a child she learnt the violin but also plays guitar, bass and keyboards. She has described her writing process as being like a "stream of consciousness". She has collaborated with musicians including lo-fi musician R. Stevie Moore and Daniel O'Sullivan, and has worked with artists such as Hot Sugar, Linda Smith and Clairo (Claire Cottrill).

== Career ==
In 2012, just before moving to Brighton, Keeler-Schaffeler signed to Critical Heights (sister label of Fire Records), where she released three singles and a self-titled LP. She left the label in 2015, choosing to self-release and work with independent labels. Her second album, With Kindness was released on 7 June 2019 on Tim Burgess's record label O Genesis Recordings.

During the COVID-19 lockdown, Keeler-Schaffeler worked on a project called Lean Logic with Nick Carlisle. They released their first album, The Last Mirage, digitally on 28 May 2021 with O Genesis Recordings.

Keeler-Schaffeler sang on Tim Burgess's solo album I Love the New Sky and featured in the official video of single "The Mall". She was part of his touring band, visiting the US in March 2020, but their tour was curtailed by the COVID-19 pandemic. They toured in the UK during 2021 and 2022. Keeler-Schaffeler sang on Burgess's subsequent album Typical Music, and featured in the official video of "Here Comes the Weekend".

Since 2022, Keeler-Schaffeler has been recording her third solo album with producer Daniel O'Sullivan and engineer Thighpaulsandra. They have also performed as a trio under the name BUNNY.

Keeler-Schaffeler also hosts a monthly music radio show on NTS called Keel Her.

== Discography ==
=== Keel Her ===
- 2012 – Prize Catch 7-inch EP (Critical Heights)
- 2012 – With Me Tonight/Boner Hit 7-inch Single (O Genesis Recordings)
- 2012 – Riot Grrrl 7-inch Single (Critical Heights)
- 2013 – Don't Look at Me 7-inch Single (Critical Heights)
- 2014 – Keel Her CD/LP (Critical Heights)
- 2016 – Keel Her / Claire Cottrill Cassette (Third Floor Tapes)
- 2019 – With Kindness CD/LP (O Genesis Recordings)

=== Lean Logic ===
- 2021 The Last Mirage Digital (O Genesis Recordings)

=== Rose Keeler-Schaffeler ===
- 2026 Universal Language LP/Digital (Magic Hollow)
