= Pretty Girl (Clairo song) =

2017 single by Clairo

Single by Clairo

from the EP Diary 001
- Released: August 4, 2017
- Recorded: 2017
- Genre: Bedroom pop; synth-pop
- Length: 2:58
- Label: Fader
- Songwriter: Claire Cottrill
- Producer: Clairo

Clairo singles chronology
"Flaming Hot Cheetos" (2017)	"Pretty Girl" (2017)	"4Ever" (2018)

Music video
- "Pretty Girl" on YouTube

"Pretty Girl" is a song by American singer-songwriter Clairo from her debut extended play (EP), Diary 001 (2018). It was released as the second single from the EP on August 4, 2017. A bedroom pop and synth-pop song, its lyrics focus on a past relationship in which Clairo felt compelled to alter and silence herself to be considered attractive; its lo-fi GarageBand production, consisting of a drum machine and synths, ultimately led to the song being deemed bedroom pop.

"Pretty Girl" received positive reviews from music critics, with many praising its cheap, homemade sound. It has been certified Platinum by Recorded Music NZ (RMNZ) and the Recording Industry Association of America (RIAA), gold by Pro-Música Brasil (PMB) and Music Canada, and additionally certified silver by the British Phonographic Industry (BPI). The song's music video, which Clairo filmed on her laptop webcam, went viral in August 2017 after being uploaded to YouTube.

== Background and production ==
Clairo originally wrote and recorded "Pretty Girl" for The Le Sigh Vol. III, the third volume of a collection of cassette compilations highlighting female and non-binary indie rock acts by the blog The Le Sigh. She later re-recorded the song for her debut EP, Diary 001, using the digital audio workstation software GarageBand, in a relatively short amount of time.

== Release and commercial performance ==
Diary 001 was released on May 25, 2018, through Fader. "Pretty Girl" is the fifth song on the standard track list. The song was later released as the second single from the EP on August 4, 2017, following "Flaming Hot Cheetos". The song has been certified twice by the Recording Industry Association of America (RIAA) and platinum by Recorded Music NZ. certified silver by the British Phonographic Industry (BPI), and certified gold by both Music Canada and Pro-Música Brasil (PMB) respectively.

== Composition and lyrics ==
"Pretty Girl" is a bedroom pop and synth-pop song; it is two minutes and fifty-eight seconds long. The track was inspired by 1980s pop music and written by Clairo about her feeling pressured to change her identity, silence herself, and conform to societal beauty standards for a past lover. Olivia Horn of The New York Times described it as "simple" and "deceptively peppy". It opens up with a four-count from a metronome, and instrumentally consists a "cheap" drum machine and "rudimentary" synths, over which Clairo sings in a deadpan tone. The track contains lyrics such as "I could be a pretty girl / shut up when you want me to". Clairo herself has stated that the song's lo-fi sound was unintentional and was a result of her resources for making the song being "pretty shitty", and also described "Pretty Girl" as her "first original pop song".

== Critical reception ==
"Pretty Girl" received positive reviews from music critics. Pitchfork's Alex Frank complimented the song as "charmingly homemade". While Katherine St. Asaph, also writing for Pitchfork, commended the song's opening verse as "a precisely observed snapshot of the moment one notices there’s nothing anymore where heartbreak used to be" and "an early indicator that Claire Cottrill's heart lay in songwriting, not content production". In a review of Diary 001, Sasha Geffen, also writing for Pitchfork, claimed that "Pretty Girl" and other songs on the EP "exhibit the kind of subtle charms that only arise after years of careful labor". Ben Beaumont-Thomas of The Guardian, wrote in a review of Clairo's 2019 album Immunity called "Pretty Girl" "the sort of thing that indie artists churn out year on year" and wrote that its "bruised naivety was charming but would have grated over numerous similar tracks". In 2021, Stereogum's Chris DeVille called the song a "bedroom-pop staple". Robert Barry of The Quietus praised "Pretty Girl" as having a "homespun charm" and "sound[ing] winningly, wonderfully, and cheap". Billboard staff placed "Pretty Girl" at number 44 out of 50 in a list of the best LGBTQ songs of the 2010s, with Stephen Daw writing that Clairo "pairs her seemingly flippant style with poignant lyrics" and has "a wry, tongue-in-cheek sense of self" about gender roles.

Following the virality of "Pretty Girl", music fans on Reddit theorized that the virality and authenticity of "Pretty Girl" had been manufactured by her father, Geoff Cottrill, after discovering that he had worked as a marketing executive for Coca-Cola and Converse, where he ran the company's Rubber Tracks recording studio, and further described her as an industry plant. In 2018, Lindsay Zoladz of The Ringer pushed back against the accusations, writing that "to believe that Geoff Cottrill was the mastermind behind 'Pretty Girl'" was "to give the Olds, and maybe even the advertising industry, more credit than they deserve".

== Music video ==
The song's music video was self-directed by Clairo. She filmed it in her childhood bedroom in about 30 minutes using Photo Booth on her MacBook laptop, which she uploaded to YouTube in August 2017. It features her dancing in her bed and lip syncing to the song, including showing a plastic toy of the character Gizmo from the 1984 film Gremlins, while drinking iced coffee from Dunkin' Donuts. Additionally, she wore various white earbuds, sweatshirts, sunglasses, pigtails, and no makeup, displaying her acne. The lyrics also appear in bright pink closed captions at the bottom of the screen. Lindsay Zoladz, writing for The New York Times, likened the video's "vibe" to being "proto-TikTok". Due to it going viral on YouTube, Clairo signed a 12-song deal with Fader Label, through her father's connection with Jon Cohen. By 2021, the video had amassed over 75 million views.

== Certifications ==
Certifications for "Pretty Girl"
Region	Certification	Certified units/sales
Brazil (Pro-Música Brasil)	Gold	30,000^{‡}
Canada (Music Canada)	Gold	40,000^{‡}
New Zealand (RMNZ)	Platinum	30,000^{‡}
United Kingdom (BPI)	Silver	200,000^{‡}
United States (RIAA)	2× Platinum	2,000,000^{‡}
^{‡} Sales+streaming figures based on certification alone.
