= Ustad Tafu =

Pakistani film music composer (1945–2024)

Altaf Hussain Tafu
- الطاف حسین طافو
- Born: Altaf Hussain Tafu; 1945; Lahore, Punjab Province, British India
- Died: 26 October 2024 (aged 79); Lahore, Punjab, Pakistan
- Other names: Ustad Tafu, Tafoo
- Occupations: Musician and film score composer
- Years active: 1970–2024
- Notable credit(s): A notable tabla player of Pakistan; A featured artist at Coke Studio Pakistan
- Relatives: Sajjad Tafu, Tariq Tafu, Tanveer Hussain (all Tafu's sons)
- Awards: Pride of Performance Award by the President of Pakistan in 2023; Nigar Award in 1979

Altaf Hussain Tafu Khan (1945 – 26 October 2024), better known as Ustad Tafu or simply Tafoo, was a Pakistani musician from Lahore, known as a 'master tabla player'. Ustad Tafu was also associated with Coke Studio Pakistan.

Tafu was the father of musicians Tariq Tafu, Tanveer Tafu, and Sajjad Tafu.

== Life and career ==
Ustad Tafu was born in Lahore, now in Pakistan, to a musician's family, "a part of a musical legacy that spans seven generations." Tafu started his career in 1970 when his first film song, Sunn wey balori akhh waaliya as music director, sung by Noor Jehan was featured in the Punjabi movie Anwara (1970). In 1971, one of his hit chartbusters-- Mahi Keh Gaya Milan Ga Main Fer Aa Ke Te Dass Ke Tareekh Na Gaya, was released in the movie Sajawal. Another film song was in the film Sohra Te Jawai (1980), sung by Noor Jehan, lyrics by Khawaja Pervez "Rab jane sahnoon te tu maar suttia". Ustad Tafu composed music for over 100 films and has worked with music artists such as Noor Jehan, Shaukat Ali, Inayat Hussain Bhatti, Naheed Akhtar and Nusrat Fateh Ali Khan.

Ustad Tafu showcased his tabla playing skills at the Coke Studio Pakistan (season 7) (2014) along with musicians Bilal Maqsood and the Pakistani pop rock music group Strings.

In 2017, Ustad Tafu claimed in an interview that he first introduced Naseebo Lal as a playback singer in the Pakistani film industry. Tafu comes from an extended family of film score composers – Master Inayat Hussain being his maternal cousin.

In 2018, Ustad Tafu also appeared on Adil Omar's album Transcendence as an arranger, percussionist and playing harmonium for "We Need to Talk About Adil."

Tafu died after a long illness in Lahore, on 26 October 2024, at the age of 79.

== Some of his films as a musician ==
- Sajawal (1971)
- Ik Madari (1973)
- Wehshi Gujjar (1979)
- Dubai Chalo (1979)
- Sohra Te Jawai (1980)
- Charda Suraj (1982)
- Des Pardes (1983)
- Madam Rani (1995)

== Some of Ustad Tafu's popular songs ==
Song title	Sung by	Lyrics by	Film and year
Suun Wey Balori Akhh Waalia	Noor Jehan	Khawaja Pervez	Anwara (1970)
Munda Shehr Lahore Da, Meray Dil Te Teer Chalaway	Noor Jehan	Khawaja Pervez	Asghara (1971)
Awwal Hamd Sanaey Ilahi Jo Maalik Herr Herr Da	Inayat Hussain Bhatti	19th century Sufi poet Mian Muhammad Bakhsh	Ghunda Act (1979)
Rab Jaaney Sahnun Tey Tu Maar Suttia, Phul Pattian Teray Kohlon Mein Duur Howan; Jehray Din Mein Mar Gai, Meinun Rona Panj Daryawaan	Noor Jehan	Khawaja Pervez	Sohra Te Jawai (1980)
Dooron Dooron Akhhian Maarey Munda Patwari Da	Noor Jehan	Khawaja Pervez	Dubai Chalo (1979)
Dil Bhi Dhak Dhak Paey Dhamaalan, Nachhan Lag Paey Saah, Sohnia Teray Jee Sadaqay, Hore Mein Aakhan Ki Sadaqay	Noor Jehan	Khawaja Pervez	Pehlwan Jee in London (1971)
Mein Allharr Punjab Di, Mahia Ghabroo Pakistan Da	Noor Jehan	Bashir Khokhar	Rab Di Shaan (1970)
Meri Vail Di Kameez Ajj Paat Gayee Aey	Noor Jehan	Khawaja Pervez	Dada (1977)
Ik Larki Tum Jaisi Khawab Mein Aati Rahi	A. Nayyar and Babra Sharif	Fayyaz Hashmi	Khuda Aur Mohabbat (1978)
Ik Baat Kahun Dildara, Tere Ishq Ne Mujh Ko Maara	A. Nayyar	Fayyaz Hashmi	Khuda Aur Mohabbat (1978)
Mein Jis Din Bhula Doon Tera Pyar Dil Se, Woh Din Aakhri Ho Meri Zindagi Ka	Mehnaz Begum	Masroor Anwar	Khushboo (1979)
Bindi Chamkay Paseenay Naal, Tey Phijj Gaey Kundalan Waley Waal	Noor Jehan	Khawaja Pervez	Charhda Suraj (1982)
Sahday Yaar Ne Banh Laey Sehray	Inayat Hussain Bhatti and Shaukat Ali	Khawaja Pervez	Charhda Suraj (1982)
Mein Cheez Barri Hoon Mast Mast	Noor Jehan	Khawaja Pervez	Madam Rani (1995)
Ki Dam Da Bharosa Yaar, Dam Aaway Na Aaway	Noor Jehan (in the last song of her singing career)	Saeed Gillani	Sakhi Badshah (1996)

== Awards and recognition ==
- Nigar Award for Best Music in film Dubai Chalo (1979)
- Pride of Performance Award by the President of Pakistan in 2023.
