= Aag (band) =

Pakistani rock band

Aag آگ
- Origin: Lahore
- Genres: Alternative, pop rock, synth band
- Instruments: Guitar (Haroon Sheikh); Drums (Usman Sheikh)
- Years active: 2005–present
- Members: Haroon Sheikh; Usman Sheikh
- Website: aagofficial.com

Aag is a rock band from Pakistan. Consisting of brothers Haroon Sheikh and Usman Sheikh, Aag has featured in musical shows in Pakistan including Velo Sound Station, Levi's Live, and Pepsi Battle of the Bands. Formed in 2005, Aag has released several original songs including "Aag", "Kaafla", "Phir Se" and the melancholic "Veeraan".

== Productions ==
Aag has also been a part of the production in the music show Nescafe Basement. Haroon and Usman also produced a number of songs in Velo Sound Station including Sajjad Ali's Dhuan.

=== TV shows ===
Velo Sound Station
Sona Chandi	Asim Azhar
Chahay Jis Shehr	Asim Azhar & Sara Haider
Tu Aaja	Abdullah Qureshi
Pyaar Ka Rog	Strings
Dhuaan	Sajjad Ali
Sun Zara	Haroon Sheikh & Usman Sheikh (Aag)

=== Films ===
Film Songs and Music Score
Song Name	Artist	Film Name	Studio Name
Masoom	Aag	13	Ebulliton Art Recordings
Khamoshiyan	Saleema Jawwad, Haroon Sheikh, Usman Sheikh	Chikkar	Ebulliton Art Recordings

Chikkar Music
Song name	Artist	Produced By
Khamoshiyan	Saleema Jawwad	Haroon Sheikh, Usman Sheikh & Zaheeruddin
Evolution	Haroon Sheikh & Usman Sheikh	Haroon Sheikh, Usman Sheikh & Zaheeruddin
Game Over	Haroon Sheikh & Usman Sheikh	Haroon Sheikh, Usman Sheikh & Zaheeruddin
Dreamscape Revisited	Haroon Sheikh & Usman Sheikh	Haroon Sheikh, Usman Sheikh & Zaheeruddin
Hangama	Arieb Azhar	Haroon Sheikh, Usman Sheikh & Zaheeruddin
Questions	Haroon Sheikh & Usman Sheikh	Haroon Sheikh, Usman Sheikh & Zaheeruddin
Dreamscape	Haroon Sheikh & Usman Sheikh	Haroon Sheikh, Usman Sheikh & Zaheeruddin

Singles & Other Notable Productions
Song name	Artist Name
Nahi Milta	Bayaan
Patang	Umer Farooq
Keh Na	Umer Farooq
Duur	Umer Farooq
Saaye Feat. Maanus Music	Turhan James
Naya Naya	Bilal Maqsood
Zalima	Bilal Maqsood
Dheem Tana	Bilal Maqsood
Thak Sa Gaya Hoon	Bilal Maqsood

== Members ==
- Haroon Sheikh - Guitar + vocals
- Usman Sheikh - Drums + backing vocals + Guitar

=== Haroon Sheikh ===
Haroon Sheikh is the frontman of the band Aag. He plays guitars and sings. Haroon also composes and produces the songs for Aag.

=== Usman Sheikh ===
Usman Sheikh, the younger brother, is the drummer in the band Aag and often lends his voice as a backing vocalist. Usman Sheikh has also been an active part in Nescafe Basement with Zulfiqar Jabbar Khan a.k.a. Xulfi. Besides Nescafe Basement, Usman Sheikh along with his brother and band member, Haroon Sheikh has produced a couple of songs for Velo Sound Station Season 1. He often plays guitar for the band in live performances. Usman Sheikh also featured as the puppet character "Jagga" on Bilal Maqsood's children's puppet show Pakkay Dost.

== Discography ==
=== Aik - Debut Album ===
- Aag
- Kafla
- Phir Se
- Veeran
- Janay Tu
- Khalish
- Nightfall
- Place We Used to Know
- Raat phaili hai (Live at BRC)
- Jahil
- Aik

=== Velo Sound Station ===
- Sun Zara

=== Renditions ===
- National Anthem (Acapella Version)
- National Songs Medley (Acapella Version)
- Tum Mil Gaye (Originally Performed by Vital Signs)
- Bewafa (Originally Performed by Imran Khan)
- Mitti (Originally Performed by Junoon)

=== Pepsi Battle of the Bands ===
- Jahil

=== Nescafe Basement ===
- Phir Se
- Do Pal

=== Levi's Live ===
- Phir Se
