= Velo Sound Station =

Pakistani television music show

- Directed by: Bilal Maqsood & Yasir Jaswal (ep 1-2), Bilal Lashari (ep 3)
- Country of origin: Pakistan
- No. of seasons: 3
- No. of episodes: 10 (5 each season)

Production
- Executive producer: Bilal Maqsood
- Production locations: Shamsi Film Studio, Karachi
- Camera setup: Multi-camera

Original release
- Network: Webcast
- Release: 20 November 2020 – present

Velo Sound Station is a Pakistani television programme and music show which features live studio-recorded music performances by veteran and emerging artists. The show is directed by Bilal Maqsood and Yasir Jaswal, former is also the executive producer of the show. The first episode of Velo Sound Station aired on 20 November 2020.

== Artists ==
=== Featured Artist season 1 ===
- Aag (band)
- Abdullah Qureshi
- Aima Baig
- Atif Aslam
- Meesha Shafi
- Natasha Noorani
- Nighat Chaudhry
- Sajjad Ali
- Sara Haider
- Shamoon Ismail
- Umair Jaswal
- Uzair Jaswal
- Strings
- Takatak

=== Featured Artist season 2 ===
- Ahsan Pervaiz
- Aima Baig
- Asim Azhar
- Atif Aslam
- Bilal Saeed
- HYDR
- Mahira Khan
- Meesha Shafi
- Natasha Noorani
- Shamoon Ismail
- Umair Jaswal
- Maanu
- Rozeo
- Sara Haider
- Talhah Yunus
- Young Stunners
- Zoha Zuberi
- Ziggy

=== Featured Artist season 3 ===
- Atif Aslam
- Natasha Noorani
- Young Stunners
- Abdul Hannan
- Risham Faiz Bhutta
- Shae Gill
- Fawad Khan
- Annural Khalid
- Hasan Raheem
- Faris Shafi
- Adnan Dhool
- Zain Zohaib

== Season 1 ==
- Bilal Maqsood - Strings Pop band

== Season 2 ==
- Yasir Jaswal - Jalaibee (2015) – Director

== Season 3 ==
- Bilal Lashahri - The Legend of Maula Jatt (2022) – Director

== Episodes season 1 ==
#	Release Date (Note: This column only contains digitally broadcast dates of song/episode.)	Song(s)	Artist(s)	Ref.
#	Release Date	Title	Artist(s)	Ref.
Episode 1
1	20 November 2020	Gagar	Umair Jaswal	
2	20 November 2020	Baby Baby	Natasha Noorani	
3	20 November 2020	Kadi Te Has Bol	Atif Aslam	
Episode 2
4	27 November 2020	Te Quiero Mucho	Aima Baig	
5	27 November 2020	Confetti	Shamoon Ismail	
6	27 November 2020	Pyaar Ka Rog	Strings	
Episode 3
7	4 December 2020	Mere Dil Ne	Uzair Jaswal & Sara Haider	
8	4 December 2020	Tu Aaja	Abdullah Qureshi	
9	4 December 2020	Boom Boom	Meesha Shafi	
Episode 4
10	11 December 2020	Dhuaan	Sajjad Ali	
11	11 December 2020	Sun Zara	Aag	
12	11 December 2020	Bijli	Aima Baig	
Episode 5
13	18 December 2020	Phantom	Takatak, Nighat Chaodhry & Team	
14	18 December 2020	Amrit	Meesha Shafi	

== Episodes season 2 ==
#	Release Date (Note: This column only contains digitally broadcast dates of song/episode.)	Song(s)	Artist(s)	Ref.
#	Release Date	Title	Artist(s)	Ref.
Episode 1
1	19 Jan 2023	Sona Chandi	Asim Azhar	
2	22 Feb 2023	Chahay Jis Shehr	Asim Azhar & Sara Haider	
3	14 May 2023	Nakhray	Umair Jaswal, Mahira Khan & Ahsan Pervaiz	
Episode 2
4	22 May 2023	Chamkeela	Natasha Noorani	
5	26 May 2023	Mangan Aiyaan	Atif Aslam	
6	27 May 2023	Deja Vu	Bilal Saeed, Talhah Yunus & Ziggy	
Episode 3
7	31 May 2023	Spicy	Maanu & Rozeo	
8	3 June 2023	Teray Naal	HYDR	
9	7 June 2023	Pardesi	Shamoon Ismail	
Episode 4
10	10 June 2023	Duur	Young Stunners	
11	14 June 2023	Saranjaam	Meesha Shafi	
12	17 June 2023	Marjaniey	Asim Azhar	
Episode 5
13	21 June 2023	Jalna	Atif Aslam & Rozeo	
14	24 June 2023	Satrangi	Aima Baig	
15	5 July 2023	Ja Oye	Zoha Zuberi & Rozeo	

== Episodes season 3 ==
- Shayar - Faris Shafi & Zain Zohaib
- Dil Ruba - Hasan Raheem & Annural Khalid
- Gila - Abdul Hannan & Shae Gill
- Sanu Ek Pal - Atif Aslam & Nusrat Fateh Ali Khan
- Clones - Young Stunners
- Chann Pichay - Natasha Noorani & Adnan Dhool
- Turbo - Atif Aslam & RFB
- Parwana - Fawad Khan

== See also ==
- Music of Pakistan
- Coke Studio
- Nescafé Basement
- Uth Records
- Bisconni Music
