= Tramp Stamps (band) =

American pop-punk band

- Origin: Nashville, Tennessee, U.S.
- Genres: Pop-punk
- Years active: 2020–2021
- Labels: Make Tampons Free, AWAL
- Past members: Marisa Maino; Caroline Baker; Paige Blue

Tramp Stamps were an American pop-punk band from Nashville, Tennessee. The trio consisted of lead singer Marisa Maino, guitarist Caroline Baker, and drummer Paige Blue. After initially gaining popularity on the platform TikTok, the group had received backlash for controversial lyrical content, usage of punk culture aesthetics without understanding their meanings, and their alleged ties to the commercial music industry.

The band typically played pop punk music, often merging elements of pop music and skate punk. Tramp Stamps' music had been characterized as "feminist punk" by Vice News and "queer punk" by Rolling Stone. Since 2020, the band had released music through their own label, Make Tampons Free.

== History ==
All three members have worked in the music industry prior to the band's formation. Blue worked as a songwriter and had produced music that appeared on shows on MTV, DirecTV, Starz and advertisements for Apple and Sephora. Baker and Maino signed deals with Dr. Luke's publishing company Prescription Songs. Maino is a writer and solo artist, and Baker is a recording artist under the stage name "Carobae".

According to Maino, who describes the band as her, Baker, and Blue "just fucking around", she had previously written songs with Blue and was a fan of Baker's writing as they all had worked for AWAL; they decided to write a song as a trio after a night of drinking, which became "I'd Rather Die". Maino suggested they form a band independently to record their work, to which Blue and Baker responded positively. Tramp Stamps marketed their work through covers on TikTok, and first started getting attention after releasing their debut single "Sex with Me". The band received significant criticism and negative attention on social media after releasing "I'd Rather Die".

Due to Maino, Blue, and Baker's careers as professional songwriters and their supposed "co-opting" of queer and punk aesthetics, Tramp Stamps has been accused of being "industry plants", but Maino has denied these claims, stating, "There [are] some times where I wish that was true, so then I could be like, "this is somebody else's fault", instead of some bullshit that I did".

== Band members ==
- Caroline Baker – guitar, background vocals
- Paige Blue – drums, background vocals
- Marisa Maino – lead vocals

== Discography ==
=== Extended plays ===
- We Got Drunk and Made an EP (2021)

=== Singles ===
- "Sex with Me" (2021)
- "1-800-miss-ur-guts" (2021)
- "I'd Rather Die" (2021)
- "The Legend of Jennifer" (2021)
- "Not So Silent Night" (2021)
