= Hook (rapper) =

American rapper (born 1999)

- Born: January 23, 1999 (age 27); San Diego, California, U.S.
- Origin: Riverside, California, U.S.
- Genres: West Coast hip hop; alternative hip hop
- Occupation: Rapper
- Instrument: Vocals
- Years active: 2019–present

Tatiana Mann (born January 23, 1999), known professionally as Hook, is an American rapper. She started her solo rap career at age 18. She released her debut studio album, Bully, in 2019, which was executive produced by record producer Nedarb, and released a collaborative album with him, Crashed My Car, in 2020.

== Life and career ==
Tatiana Mann was born on January 23, 1999 in San Diego and raised in Riverside, California. Her biological father was a rapper. As a child, she was in two R&B girl groups with her stepsisters that were managed by her stepfather, in which she was a singer and rapper. There, she first came up with her stage name, Hook, due to her writing the hooks for most of the groups' songs. While in the groups, she toured various Los Angeles high schools and transitioned to homeschooling in order to accommodate her touring schedule. Also with her stepfather, she recorded her first song, "Pop My Gum". Mann attended the Riverside City College with plans to study forensic science, but dropped out, considering it to be less important than making music. She started her solo rap career at age 18.

Hook made her musical debut with her debut mixtape, Hook, at the beginning of 2019. Hook's debut studio album Bully was released on June 24, 2019, and executive produced by record producer Nedarb, who previously worked extensively with rapper Lil Peep. Her second mixtape, I Love You, Hook, was released on September 27, 2019, preceded by its single "Stand It". She released the single "Bad Bitty" with a music video in November 2019. Her collaborative third album alongside Nedarb, Crashed My Car, was released on January 23, 2020; her album I Love You 2, Hook and her mixtape Pretty Bitty: The Mixtape, were both also released in 2020.

Hook's album From, Hook was released in January 2022 and her album Castle was released in March 2024.

== Musical style ==
Hook's music is West Coast and alternative hip hop. Jack Angell of The Fader described her flow as "staccato" and "unorthodox" and her lyrics as "unapologetic", also writing that her 2019 album, Bully, was "a SoundCloud-influenced take on classic West Coast hyphy and G-funk styles". For Pitchfork, Nadine Smith also wrote that her delivery was "staccato" and that her "confident and calculated" flow was often backed by "overdubs and ad-libs" that sounded "exasperated, overrun with anxiety and gasping for breath". Alphonse Pierre, also of Pitchfork, wrote that her songs on Bully and 2020's Crashed My Car were West Coast "house party anthems", while her later music was defined by "mayhem" and being "deranged", also writing that her best songs "crash different moods together like bumper cars".

Pierre and NPR's Stephen Thompson both called her rapping style "combative". Uproxx's Aaron Williams also wrote in 2020 that she has "an unconventional flow and a quirky ear for beats". Jordan Darville, for The Fader, wrote that her 2024 album Castle showcased her "experimental tendencies".

Hook has stated that her primary musical inspiration is Back from the Dead, a 2012 mixtape by Chief Keef, which she listened to while high on psychedelics and was inspired by its experimental nature. She has also said that she is inspired by artists she was introduced to by her parents growing up: R&B artists such as Mary J. Blige and SWV from her mother, chopped and screwed music from her biological father, and hip hop artists such as Rick Ross and Nipsey Hussle from her stepfather. Hook also produces her own music.

== Personal life ==
As of 2019, Hook is based out of Leimert Park in South Los Angeles. She has stated that she has post-traumatic stress disorder (PTSD) from crashing her car nine times.
