= Industry plant =

Pejorative for musical artists

Industry plant is a pejorative used to describe musicians who are believed to have become popular through nepotism, inheritance, wealth, favoritism, or their connections in the music industry rather than on their own merits or organic growth. Artists described as industry plants often present themselves as independent and self-made, but are alleged to have their public images manufactured for them by record labels.

The term originated in the early 2010s on hip hop-focused message boards to describe various rappers before being used against indie rock and pop musicians, such as Clairo and Billie Eilish, in the late 2010s. It has been called a conspiracy theory by critics and criticized in the media by artists for being disproportionately used against female artists and for placing scrutiny on individual musicians rather than the music industry as a whole.

== Usage ==
The term "industry plant" commonly refers to musicians who quickly find success, regardless of skill or merit, and describe themselves as self-made and independent despite being heavily supported by a record label or having other resources and connections to the music industry that they intentionally hide, while also being more focused on business than on artistic expression. It is typically used as a pejorative by music fans, largely of Generation Z, against artists who they believe to be undeserving of their fame or success.

Artists who are called industry plants are sometimes alleged to have had their personas manufactured by marketing executives before being marketed to the public. It has been compared to the idea of "selling out".

== History ==
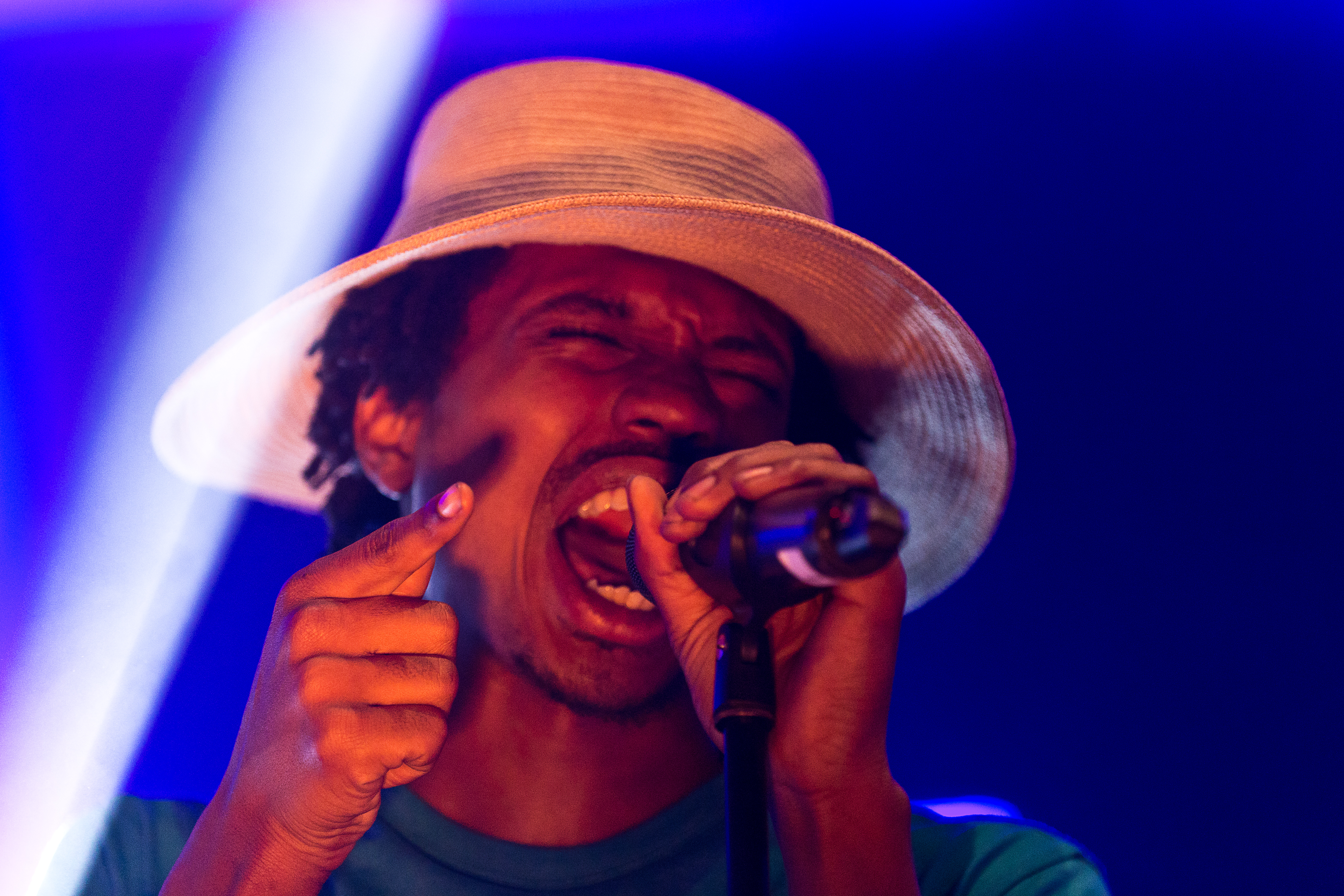
American rapper Raury (pictured) was widely accused of being an industry plant online in 2015. In response, he wore a shirt reading "industry plant" on the cover of XXL's Freshman Class issue in 2015.

The term "industry plant" is believed to have originated on hip hop message boards in the early 2010s, gaining popularity after being used in a thread on the discussion forum KanyeToThe in 2012, in which rappers such as Lil Wayne, 50 Cent, and Waka Flocka Flame were alleged by users to be industry plants. American singer Lana Del Rey has retrospectively been described as an early example of industry plant accusations. Upon the release of her debut studio album Born to Die (2012), her wealthy parents and her previous musical career as Lizzy Grant led to questions about her authenticity as an artist.

After American rapper Raury released his mixtape, Indigo Child, in 2014, was quickly signed to Columbia Records, and received coverage from Billboard for the music video for his song "God's Whisper", he was frequently called an industry plant online in 2015. He appeared on the cover of XXL for their annual Freshman Class list of up-and-coming artists in 2015, where he wore a shirt reading "industry plant" in response to the accusations. Christina Lee of Vice wrote in 2015 that "recent talk of Raury being an industry plant" was "silly" but "makes some sense", while Chris Thomas of Out called Raury "a popular target of industry plant conspiracy theorists" in 2017. Chance the Rapper faced similar accusations of being an industry plant on music forums by 2015 due to his sudden success after independently releasing several mixtapes.

The term "industry plant" later became popular among indie rock fans. The increase in industry plant rumors in the late 2010s has been attributed by critics to the rise of music streaming. Clairo, who quickly rose to fame after her song "Pretty Girl" went viral online in 2017, was described by Leor Galil of the Chicago Reader as "a magnet for 'industry plant' insults" since 2017, when Reddit threads about her father working as the chief marketing officer of Converse and co-founding its Rubber Tracks recording studio before she became popular led to accusations of her being an industry plant. Other users alleged that her "homespun" image was also created by her father and his associates, and the usage of the term to describe her led to the term gaining more widespread usage.

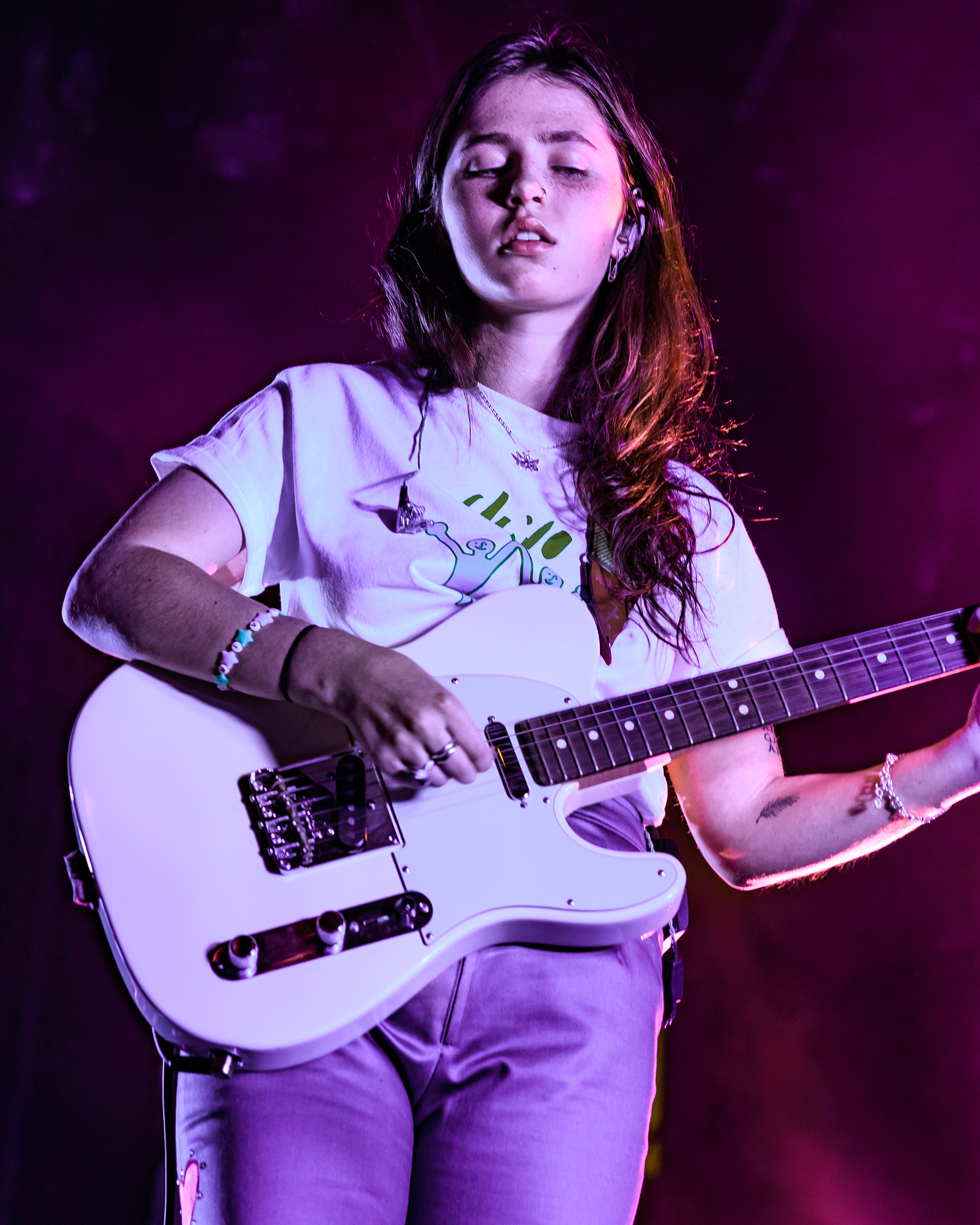
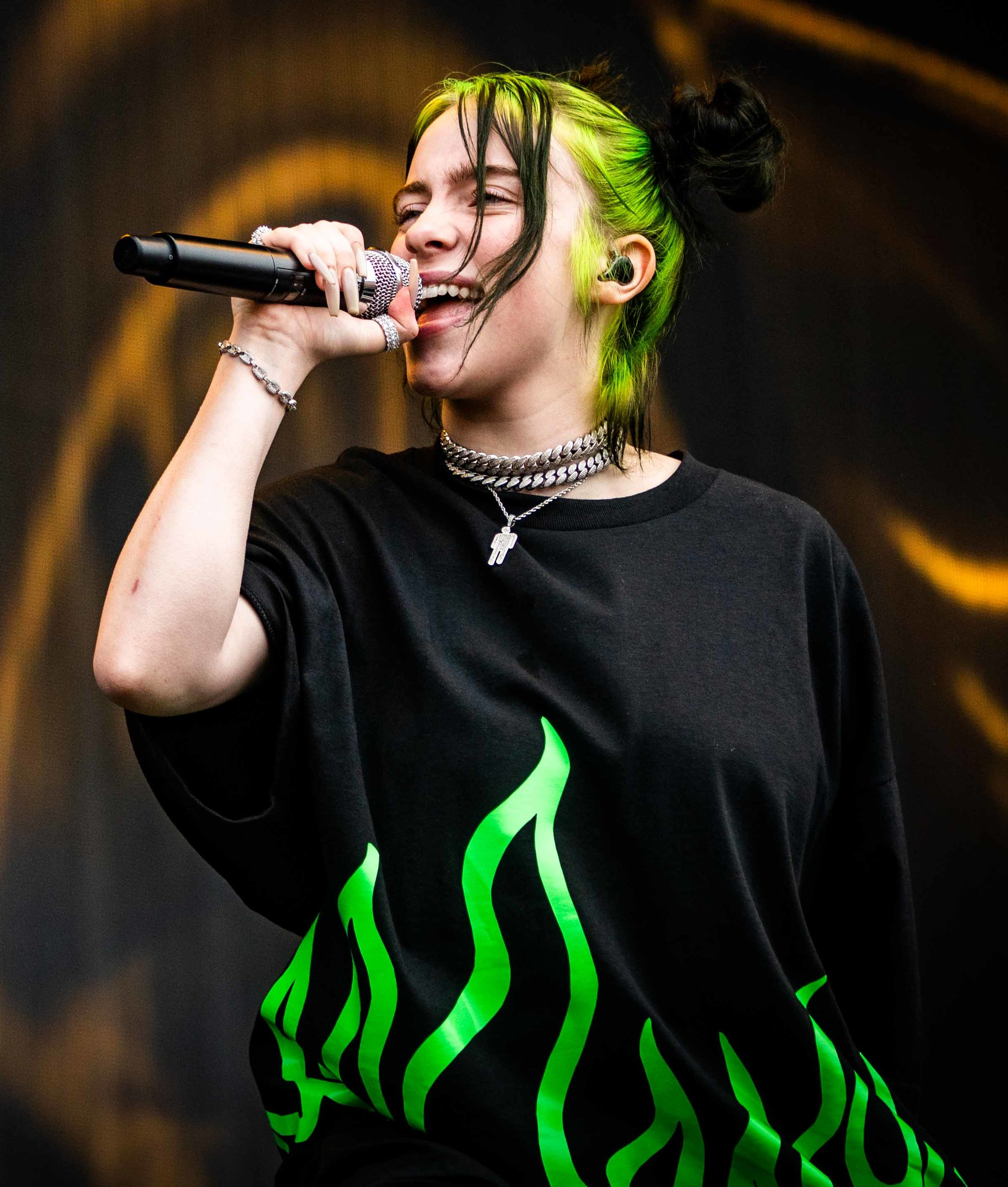
The use of the term "industry plant" online to describe American singer Clairo (left) in 2017 brought it to more widespread use. American singer Billie Eilish (right) also became a frequent topic of industry plant discussions online by 2018.

After gaining fame from her song "Bury a Friend" in 2018, American singer Billie Eilish was frequently called an industry plant online on YouTube and Reddit, where users similarly made threads about her personality being manufactured. Puerto Rican rapper Iann Dior named his debut studio album, Industry Plant (2020), after his being called an industry plant due to his quick rise to fame. Also in 2020, American singer-songwriter Phoebe Bridgers responded to accusations that she was an industry plant, including a music critic who tweeted that they were "on team 'Phoebe Bridgers is an industry plant'", by stating that the Strokes and "every white boy who is mediocre" were industry plants as well and calling it "such an insane fucking double standard".

The American pop punk band Tramp Stamps were widely criticized by social media users as industry plants in April 2021, particularly on TikTok, due to their previous solo careers as pop singers and how their image had changed and become "calculated" and "polished" upon starting the band. Reddit users also found that the band's guitarist, Caroline Baker, was signed to record producer Dr. Luke's publishing house Prescription Songs, which furthered the accusations. In response, Rebecca Jennings of Vox wrote that "being an 'industry plant' is about the worst thing you can be accused of on TikTok".

In June 2021, American singer H.E.R. responded to claims that she was an industry plant on Instagram. Following the international success of American singer Olivia Rodrigo's debut single "Drivers License" in 2021, music journalists and critics debated on whether or not she was an industry plant. Podcaster DJ Akademiks has frequently discussed the concept of industry plants, including his calling American rapper Megan Thee Stallion one in June 2021 and alleging that her success in the music industry was due to her being shot by rapper Tory Lanez the year before.

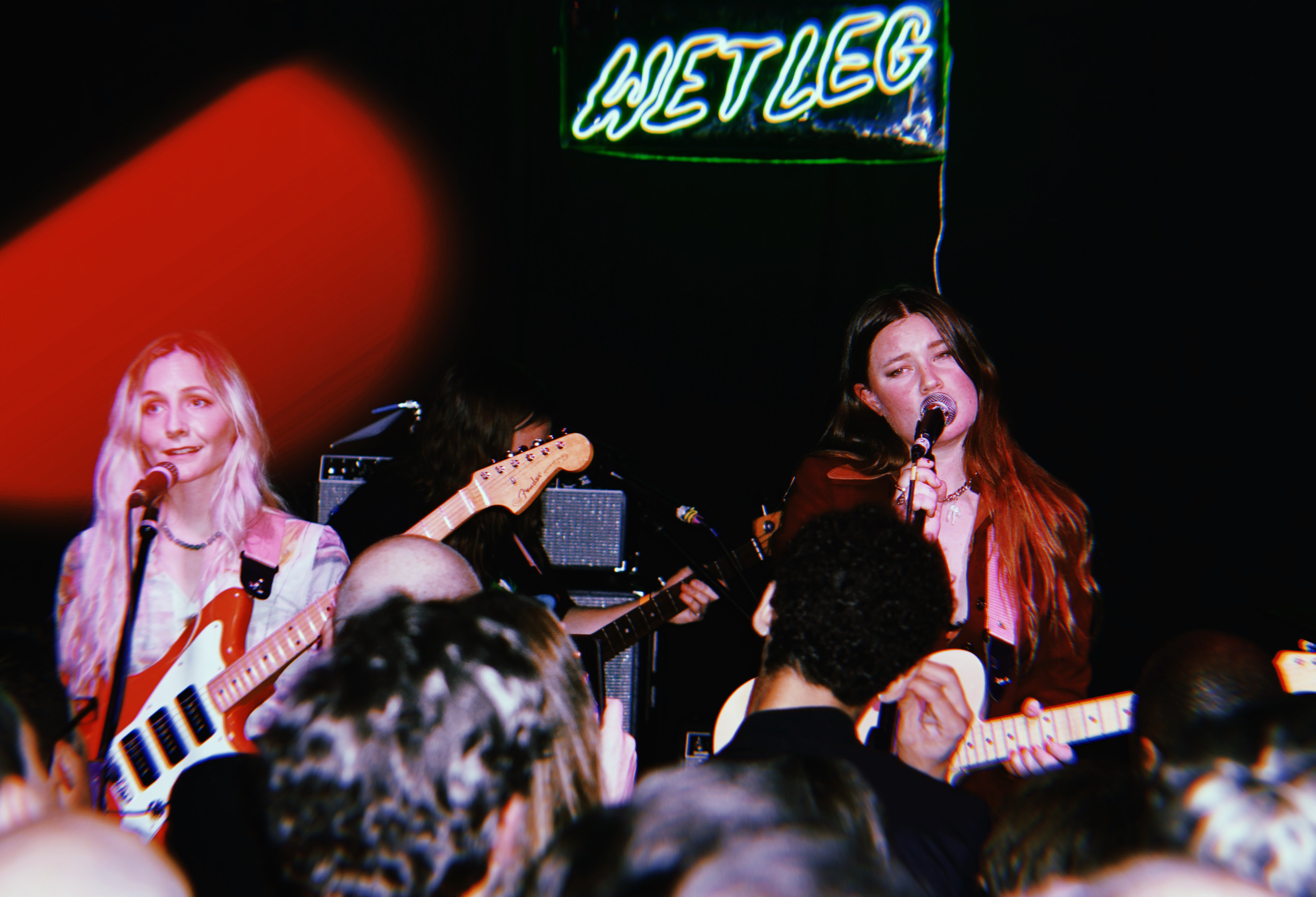

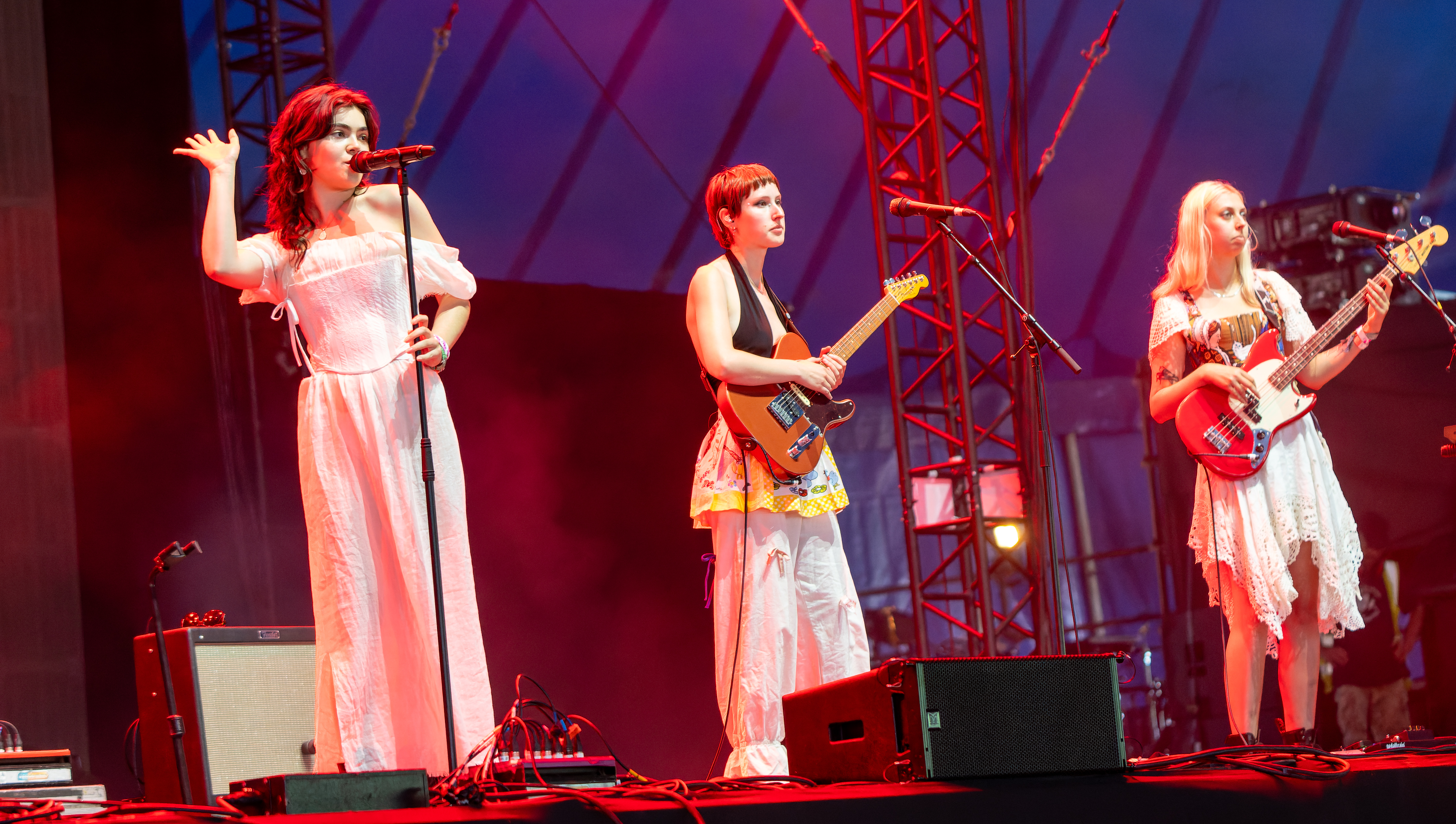
British indie rock acts like Wet Leg (top) and The Last Dinner Party (bottom) faced accusations on social media of being industry plants in the 2020s.

The British indie rock duo Wet Leg became frequent targets of industry plant accusations after their rise to prominence in 2021, which they described as "just misogyny". American singer Gayle's song "ABCDEFU" became internationally successful by early 2022 after initially finding success on TikTok, where she premiered the song in response to a commenter asking her to "write a breakup song using the alphabet". Commenters on the platform alleged that she was an industry plant upon discovering that the comment prompting the song was left by an Atlantic Records marketing manager.

After the success of their debut single, "Nothing Matters", in April 2023, the British indie rock band the Last Dinner Party were widely accused by social media users, including on Twitter, of being industry plants due to their being signed to Island Records and opening for the Rolling Stones, among other things. The group responded to the accusations on Twitter, calling them "just a nasty lie". In June 2023, the indie rock band Picture Parlour released their debut single "Norwegian Wood" and were featured on the cover of NME, leading to users on Twitter widely accusing them of being industry plants. The band's singer, Katherine Parlour, said in response to the accusations that they "seem[ed] like lazy journalism" and that there was "a predominant history of male-fronted bands ... who have happened to gain a large buzz pretty quickly" and not "one that has been questioned".

After his song "Rich Men North of Richmond" went viral and became popular among American conservatives in August 2023, American singer Oliver Anthony was suspected of being an industry plant by American progressives. Also in August 2023, the hardcore punk band Scowl were alleged by fans to be industry plants, which prompted frontwoman Kat Moss to release a statement on Twitter denying and decrying the claims. American rapper Ice Spice was accused of being an industry plant after she shot to stardom following the release of her song "Munch (Feelin' U)", which went viral on TikTok, in 2022. She stated in response to the accusations that she would "let people believe whatever they want to believe" in an interview with Variety in September 2023. On TikTok, users speculated that 4Batz, an American rapper who found success through his first three songs released independently throughout 2023—including "Act II: Date @ 8", the remix of which featured Drake—was an industry plant because of the rapidness of his rise to fame and his "Spotify-core" musical style. He called the allegations "kind of cool" and likened himself to "the boogeyman" because of them.

In 2024, Kyndall Cunningham of Vox attributed the increased online accusations of artists as industry plants to a rise in social media users' "compulsive skepticism" and their "questioning the legitimacy of everything" following the COVID-19 pandemic. A social media post calling American singer Chappell Roan an industry plant went viral in June 2024. She pushed back against claims that she was an industry plant because of her runaway success and the quick rise in interest in her 2023 debut studio album, The Rise and Fall of a Midwest Princess, in 2024, stating that she had been working within the music industry for ten years prior; the idea of her being an industry plant was also mocked online by fans and critics.

The term has also been used online and by critics to describe artists such as Sabrina Carpenter. Dominic Fike, Jean Dawson, CJ, Bebe Rexha, Boy Pablo, RMR, Bella Poarch, the Kid Laroi, Skip Marley, Your Old Droog, Post Malone, Adéla, 4Batz, and Lizzo.

== Criticism ==
Claims of artists being industry plants have been described as conspiracy theories by critics. In 2023, Complex's Trace William Cowen called industry plant accusations "among the dumbest quasi-theories some listeners like to throw around whenever a new artist breaks through". Hazel Cills stated for NPR that industry plants "don't really exist" and that the term "keeps getting thrown around by younger audiences" because of changes in the music industry and "a kind of skepticism when a young person sees an artist and they're not already inundated with their body of work".

The term "industry plant" has also been criticized as meaningless or vague. Josh Terry of Vice wrote that the term had "no adequate definition" and that there was "no consensus at all on what an 'industry plant' actually is". For Clash, Robin Murray wrote that the term was "hopelessly vague, and more a criticism of ... a general, undefinable sense of inauthenticity, than any actual intersection with the music". For Jezebel, Cills wrote that "the term often means nearly whatever the critic in question wants it to mean".

Critics have described the pejorative as being used more commonly against young women than other artists. Josh Terry of Vice wrote that it was "disproportionately directed at non-white, non-male-identifying artists". Kyann-Sian Williams of NME also stated that it was "often assigned to non-white, non-male success stories", while Far Out's Elle Palmer wrote that it "seems to be disproportionately thrown at successful young women starting out in the industry, and often with very little research to back up the damaging label" and was "an easy way to dismiss the talent of young women". Under the Radar's Andy Von Pip also wrote that the term was "a crass and often deeply misogynistic attempt to undermine [the] credibility and creativity" of female artists.

Nick Ruskell of The Daily Telegraph wrote that the music industry was "far more to blame" for artists with less connections not finding success "than individual artists trying to play the game". Cills wrote that the term "emphasiz[ed] a narrative that suggests popular artists are either authentic or totally fake, working without any outside help or label puppets, when in reality the lines are depressingly blurrier". For Vox, Rebecca Jennings wrote that the criticism of Tramp Stamps in 2021 as industry plants became "a complete dogpile on three individual women rather than corporatized capitalization on progressive politics". Terry wrote that it "blam[ed] artists for the machinations of a system beyond their control".

== See also ==
- Nepo baby
- Astroturfing
- "Brian Wilson is a genius"
