= Takatak =

Pakistani metal band

- Origin: Lahore, Pakistan
- Genres: Progressive metal, djent
- Years active: 2009–2012, 2018–present
- Members: Zain Peerzada; Luke Azariah; Yusuf Ramay; Daud Ramay; Altamash Sever; Ali Suhail; Isa Najam
- Past members: Misbahuddin

Takatak is a Pakistani progressive metal/djent band from Lahore, Punjab, formed in 2009. Takatak is one of the few metal bands currently active in Pakistan. The band released its first album, Acrophase, in October 2020, more than 10 years after the band was formed.

== Background ==
Formed in 2009, Takatak initially had three members, Zain Peerzada, Yusuf Ramay and Misbahuddin (also known as Misbah). The group's current line-up consists of Zain Peerzada and Luke Azariah on guitars, Yusuf Ramay and Daud Ramay on drums, Altamash Sever and Ali Suhail on vocals and Isa Najam on bass.

Takatak initially remained active for three years before going into a hiatus in 2012. They made a comeback in 2018, when they headlined at the Lahore Music Meet with two new songs, Voyager and Phantom. This was a turning point for the band.

The band also released their debut EP, 'Out of Something', in 2018, which consisted of four songs. The same year, Takatak started working on their first studio album titled Acrophase. The first single from the album, 'Fault Lines', was released in early 2020. More singles came out before the complete album, consisting of eight songs in total was released in October 2020. Acrophase was mixed by Keshav Dhar of Skyharbor and mastered by Ermin Hamidovich. Metal Injection readers named it the best debut album of 2020.

In December 2020, Takatak debuted on Velo Sound Station with classical dancer Nighat Chaudhary who performed alongside the band on their single Phantom.

== Acrophase (2020) ==
On October 17th, 2020, Takatak released their first full length album called 'Acrophase'. The album consisted of 8 tracks (in order):

1. Far Away
2. Volition
3. Fault lines
4. Voyager
5. The Whale
6. Acrophase
7. Phantom
8. Flash Your Bones

The song 'Fault Lines' however reached around 363,024 plays on Spotify and over 100,000 views on Youtube (as of 21/9/2026), marking it as Takatak's most popular song from the album.
