= I Love the New Sky =

Studio album by Tim Burgess
- Released: 22 May 2020
- Length: 52:58
- Label: Bella Union

Tim Burgess chronology
As I Was Now (2018)	I Love the New Sky (2020)	Typical Music (2022)

Professional ratings
Aggregate scores
Source	Rating
Metacritic	79/100
Review scores
Source	Rating
AllMusic	3.5/5 stars
Clash	8/10
DIY	3.5/5 stars
Exclaim!	8/10
The Independent	4/5 stars
The Line of Best Fit	8.5/10
Louder Than War	9/10
MusicOMH	4/5 stars
NME	4/5 stars
The Observer	4/5 stars

I Love the New Sky is the fifth studio album by English musician Tim Burgess. It was released on 22 May 2020 under Bella Union.

== Commercial performance ==
The album ranked at No.31 on the UK Albums Chart

== Critical reception ==
I Love the New Sky was met with "generally favourable" reviews from critics. At Metacritic, which assigns a weighted average rating out of 100 to reviews from mainstream publications, this release received an average score of 79, based on 11 reviews. Aggregator Album of the Year gave the album 78 out of 100 based on 13 reviews.

== Track listing ==
All tracks are written by Tim Burgess

I Love the New Sky track listing
No.	Title	Length
1.	"Empathy For The Devil"	4:20
2.	"Sweetheart Mercury"	3:54
3.	"Comme D'Habitude"	4:21
4.	"Sweet Old Sorry Me"	3:45
5.	"The Warhol Me"	5:35
6.	"Lucky Creatures"	4:25
7.	"The Mall"	4:39
8.	"Timothy"	4:13
9.	"Only Took A Year"	4:06
10.	"I Got This"	4:13
11.	"Undertow"	4:31
12.	"Laurie"	4:56
Total length:		52:57

== Charts ==
Chart performance for I Love the New Sky
Chart (2020)	Peak position
Scottish Albums (OCC)	5
UK Albums (OCC)	31
UK Independent Albums (OCC)	3
