= Adil Omar =

Pakistani musician

Adil Omar عادل عمر
- Born: 17 May 1991 (age 34); London, England
- Origin: Islamabad, Pakistan
- Genres: Hip hop; psychedelic; industrial; pop; g-funk; electronica; alternative hip hop; hardcore hip hop; psychedelic rock; world music; synthwave
- Occupations: Rapper; singer; songwriter; record producer
- Years active: 2004–present
- Website: adilomar.com

Adil Omar (born 17 May 1991) is a Pakistani rapper, singer, songwriter, record producer and filmmaker from Islamabad. In addition to being a solo artist, he is also involved in songwriting and production for other artists.

== Biography and early life ==
Omar was born in London, England, but grew up in Islamabad. He lost his father at the age of 10 due to alcoholism and saved his mother's life at 11. In 1998, Omar's father was falsely imprisoned which was revealed in a series of prison letters posted to Omar's social media. He had a stutter which he learned to manage through rapping. He was in and out of multiple schools and eventually dropped out at 17 to pursue a career in music.

== Music career ==
=== Career beginnings ===
Omar was raised on Pink Floyd and other classic rock from birth and got introduced to hip-hop at age 5 with Tupac Shakur. He was then inspired by Dr. Dre to become a hip hop artist at the age of 8 after watching "Keep Their Heads Ringin'" then started writing lyrics and rapping at the age of 9 after listening to Wu-Tang Clan's The W album. He began recording and producing music by 13. In 2008, Omar caught the attention of B-Real of Cypress Hill who invited him to visit Los Angeles, helping launch his music career.

Between 2010 and 2012, Omar put together The Mushroom Cloud Effect, a street album consisting of compiled tracks and unheard demos of Omar's early rapping and non-production work with Soul Assassins affiliated producers such as Fredwreck, DJ Solo and DJ Lethal handling the music. The most notable song was "Paki Rambo". This was during press coverage on BBC, CNN, The Associated Press and many other news outlets which brought Omar considerable attention. This was followed by a government-imposed YouTube ban which momentarily affected the distribution and exposure of all independent musicians in the country.

=== 2015–2017: Margalla King and SNKM ===
In early 2015, Omar formed the songwriting and production duo SNKM which came out with Omar's directorial debut for "Nighat & Paras" and was followed by their first showcase at SXSW.

In early 2016, SNKM collaborated and performed with Diplo and Elliphant for their first Pakistan show. This was followed by the duo's second appearance at SXSW and Omar's solo EP Margalla King. The EP also featured a collaboration with Bun B.

Omar and SNKM joined the roster for multiple Mad Decent Block Party 2016 shows alongside Diplo, Kesha, Marshmello, Rae Sremmurd and others. The duo continued performing and touring with Diplo, Major Lazer, Skrillex, Valentino Khan and other artists throughout 2017 up until early 2018 when Omar returned to his solo efforts.

=== 2017–2019: Transcendence ===
Omar announced in late 2017 that his self-produced debut studio album Transcendence for a 2018 release. Transcendence was released as a 10-song visual album on 8 July 2018. The lead single was "We Need to Talk About Adil" and guests on the album included Elliphant, Tim Armstrong of Rancid, Shaman Durek and others. The album also included recreations of 1970s and 1980s era Lollywood soundtracks, but rather than relying on sampling, Omar reached out to some of the original creators such as Ustad Tafu and M. Arshad and hosted live sessions in his home studio in Bisonopolis, Islamabad. The instrumental version of the album was released on 8 October 2018.

=== 2019–present: Mastery ===
A track called "Mastery" was released on 7 February 2019. A second single titled "Mission" was released on 28 April 2019 which has been described as a "futuristic song that can’t be put in any one genre". On 30 November 2019, Omar headlined Pepsi's first-ever hip-hop show in Pakistan for Pepsi Black to positive reviews from attendees and reporters for a "surprising, unconventional, and animated" performance.

On 12 January 2020, Omar released "The Great Unraveling" which featured Dave Sitek of TV on the Radio on guitars and a music video set in Jungle World, Rawalpindi to mostly positive reviews. Omar released "Alien" on 22 March 2020 which has been described as "(not hiding) from the inner rage that we all can experience from time to time; the alienation or standing at the precipice. Much more importantly, Adil Omar has started showcasing the man he has become and his progression as a singer-songwriter, rapper, lyricist and producer; it’s been a long journey from ‘Paki Rambo’. Adil is building his own narrative, which is not always about him but the world around him and his interpretation of it" while "the adventurous production is what takes the cake."

== Musical style and influences ==
Omar has musical and stylistic influences stemming from a wide range of genres such as hip-hop, pop, psychedelic industrial rock, world music, electronica, dance and classical.

== Personal life ==
Omar was born with multiple forms of synesthesia, the most powerful being sound-color, a neurological condition in which the person affected sees colors when tones are sounded. In a 2018 interview, he is quoted to have said "Everything I make and produce is based on how it looks to me. I look at my songs as audio paintings. My production is as visual as it is sonic. I can't comprehend sound as a solely auditory experience. It's an alien concept to me. I guess it's cool seeing every sound I hear but it makes driving distracting. I know how to drive but I generally don't drive because of this."

In 2012, Omar was nearly electrocuted to death in the shower, an incident he talks about on his debut album Transcendence.

== Discography ==
=== Albums ===
- 2018: Transcendence
- 2024: Adil

=== Mixtapes/EPs ===
- 2013: The Mushroom Cloud Effect
- 2015: Saturday Night Killing Machine (with SNKM)
- 2016: Margalla King
