= Elliphant =

Swedish singer (born 1985)

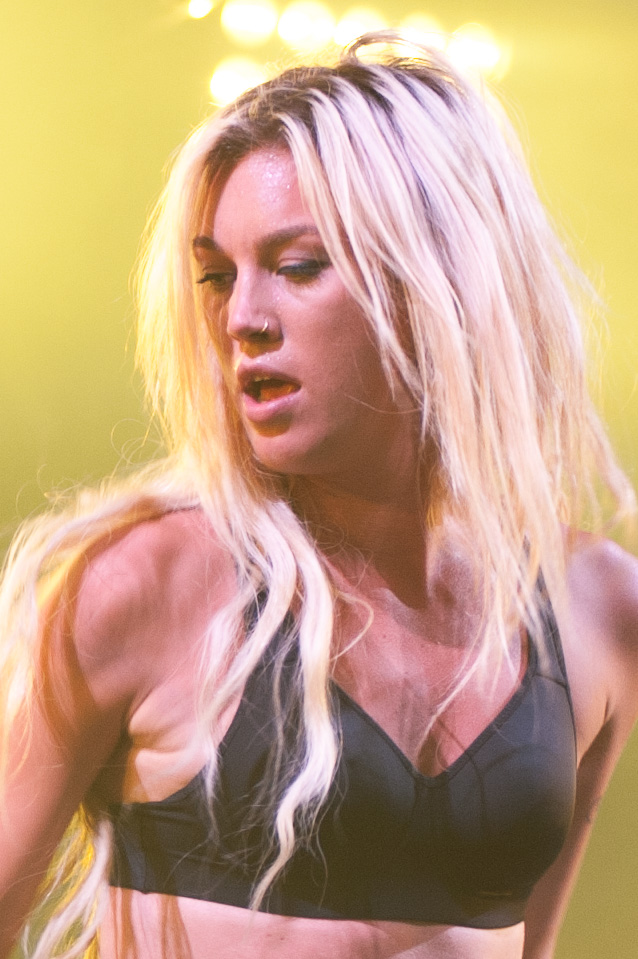
- Elliphant in 2015

Background information
- Born: Ellinor Miranda Salome Olovsdotter; 8 October 1985 (age 41); Stockholm, Sweden
- Genres: Electronic; synth-pop; alternative hip hop; dancehall; trap
- Occupations: Singer; songwriter; rapper
- Years active: 2012–present
- Labels: Bigger Splash; Universal; TEN; Kemosabe; Mad Decent
- Website: elliphant.com

Ellinor Miranda Salome Olovsdotter (born 8 October 1985), known professionally as Elliphant, is a Swedish singer, rapper and songwriter. Her sound was initially created together with the Swedish production duo Jungle, which consists of Tim Denéve and Ted Krotkiewski. The music they created together caught the attention of TEN Music Group, to which Elliphant signed in 2011. Elliphant also supported Major Lazer, the side project of American producer and DJ Diplo, on their 2015 European tour.

== Life and career ==
=== Early life and career beginnings ===
Elliphant was born Ellinor Miranda Salome Olovsdotter in Stockholm to an Icelandic family. In 2011, Elliphant was at a party in Paris when she met producer Tim Denéve, who needed someone that could sing and help him with his demos. Six months later, she signed to TEN Music Group.

=== 2012–2013: Elliphant and A Good Idea ===
Elliphant released her debut single "Tekkno Scene" in 2012. The track, which features rapper Adam Kanyama, was positively received and was featured in the video game FIFA 13. The song earned comparisons to M.I.A. and Diplo. In October 2012, Elliphant released her eponymous debut extended play on A Bigger Splash Records, including the singles "Tekkno Scene" and "Down on Life".

Following the release of her first EP, Elliphant stated in an interview with Idolator in July 2013 that she had signed to Dr. Luke's label Kemosabe Records and that her Swedish debut studio album would be titled A Good Idea. The album was released in her native Sweden on 9 October 2013, and features a number of artists and producers, including Swedish duo Niki and the Dove, who are featured on the track "More Fire".

=== 2014–present: Look Like You Love It, One More and Living Life Golden ===
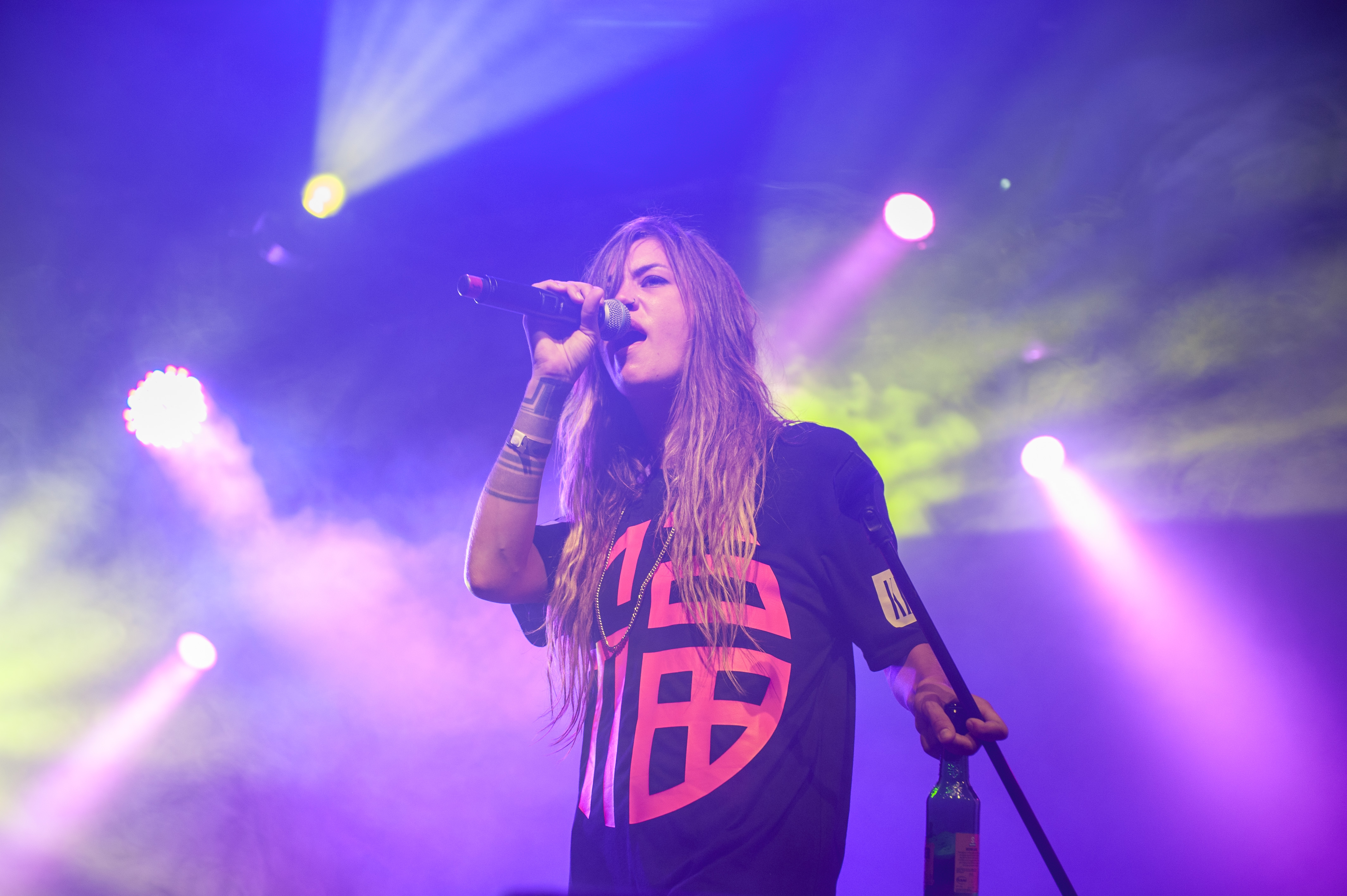
Elliphant at Way Out West 2014

Elliphant released her second EP, titled Look Like You Love It, in April 2014 via Kemosabe Records and Mad Decent, featuring production from Dr. Luke, Diplo, Skrillex and Dave Sitek. It was followed by yet another EP, One More, in October, whose title track features Danish singer MØ. Elliphant was one of the opening acts on Charli XCX's Girl Power North America Tour in September and October 2014.

In early July 2015, it was announced that Elliphant's second studio album and North American debut album, Living Life Golden, would be released on 25 September by Kemosabe Records. However, it was reported in late August 2015 that the album's release had been pushed back to an unspecified date. In December 2015, it was announced that the album would be released on 25 March 2016. At the ARIA Music Awards of 2017 the Song of the Year category was won by "Stranger" featuring Elliphant. As one of the track's songwriters, Elliphant also won Dance Work of the Year and Most Played Australian Work at the APRA Music Awards of 2018.

In 2018, the song "Everybody" was featured at the end of the film The Spy Who Dumped Me. Later in 2018, a new Elliphant song "To the End" was featured in the film Spider-Man: Into the Spider-Verse, serving as the introduction music for Spider-Woman. The song was released in January 2019.

She released her third studio album Rocking Horse in April 2021, preceded by the singles "Uterus", "Had Enough", "Time Machine", "White Tiger", "Could This Be Love", "Drunk & Angry" and "Notorious".

== Discography ==
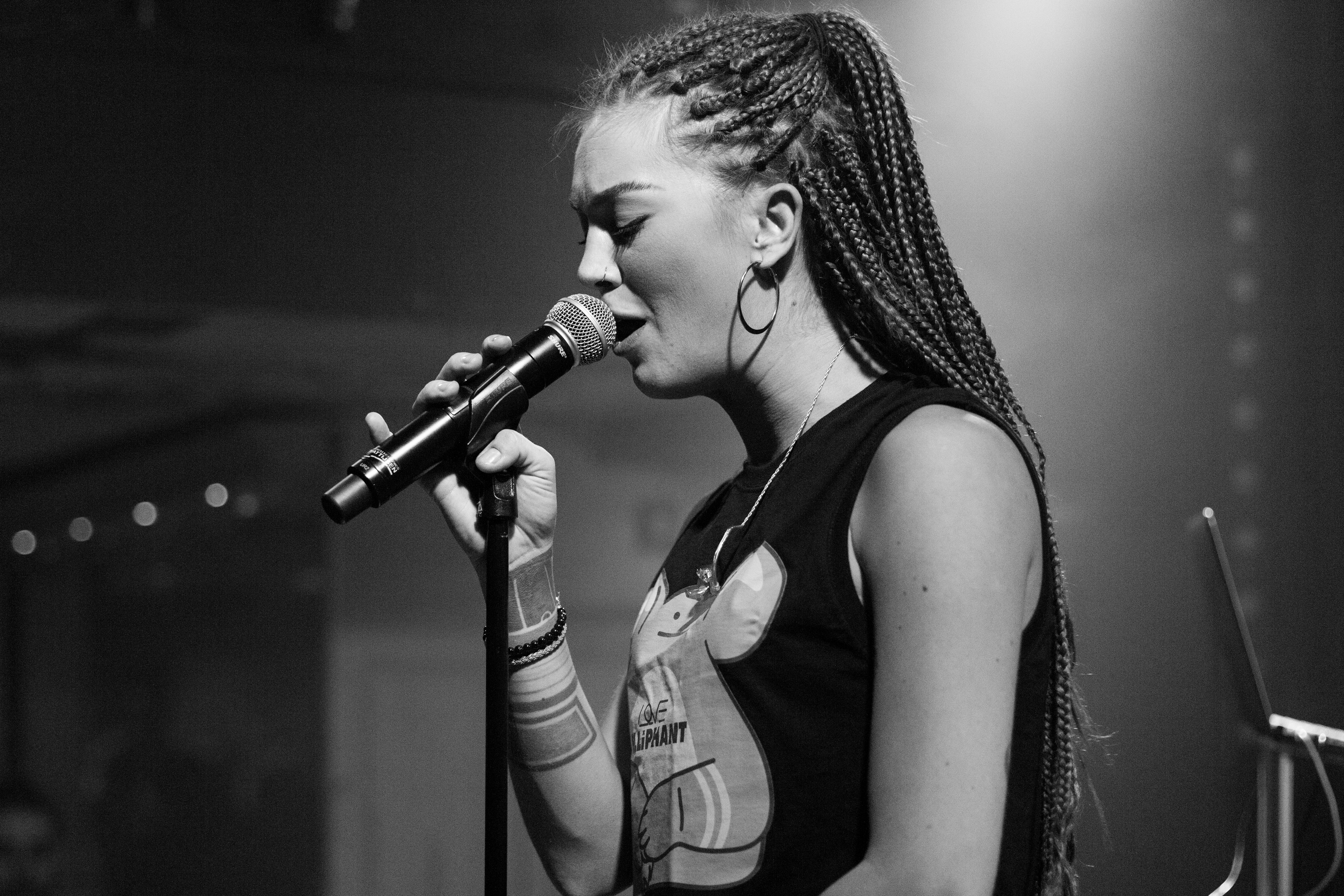
Elliphant at Bitterzoet, Amsterdam in 2016

=== Studio albums ===
| Title | Details | Peak chart positions | |
| Title | Details | SWE | AUS |
|---|---|---|---|
| A Good Idea | Released: 9 October 2013; Label: TEN, Universal; Formats: CD, LP, digital download | — | — |
| Living Life Golden | Released: 25 March 2016; Label: TEN, Kemosabe; Formats: CD, digital download | 50 | 76 |
| Rocking Horse | Released: 23 April 2021; Label: Create Music Group; Formats: Digital download, streaming | — | — |
| Troll | Released: 26 January 2024; Label: Milkshake (Sony Music Entertainment); Formats: Digital download, streaming | — | — |

=== Extended plays ===
| Title | Details |
|---|---|
| Elliphant | Released: 5 October 2012; Label: A Bigger Splash; Formats: 12" vinyl, digital download |
| Look Like You Love It | Released: 15 April 2014; Label: TEN, Kemosabe, Mad Decent; Formats: CD, digital download |
| One More | Released: 14 October 2014; Label: TEN, Kemosabe; Formats: CD, LP, digital download |
| Napster Live Session | Released: 21 August 2015; Label: TEN, Kemosabe; Format: Digital download |

=== Singles ===
==== As lead artist ====
| Title | Year | Album |
|---|---|---|
| "Tekkno Scene" (featuring Adam Kanyama) | 2012 | Elliphant |
| "Live Till I Die" | 2013 | A Good Idea |
| "Music Is Life" (featuring Ras Fraser Jr.) | 2013 | A Good Idea |
| "Down on Life" | 2013 | A Good Idea |
| "Could It Be" | 2013 | A Good Idea |
| "One More" (featuring MØ) | 2014 | One More |
| "Never Been in Love" | 2015 | One More |
| "All or Nothing" (Riton iPad Remix) (featuring The Gaslamp Killer) | 2015 | Non-album single |
| "Love Me Badder" | 2015 | Living Life Golden |
| "Best People in the World" | 2015 | Non-album singles |
| "Club Now Skunk" (featuring Big Freedia) | 2015 | Non-album singles |
| "North Star (Bloody Christmas)" | 2015 | Non-album singles |
| "Step Down" | 2016 | Living Life Golden |
| "Spoon Me" | 2016 | Living Life Golden |
| "Where Is Home" | 2016 | Living Life Golden |
| "Uterus" | 2020 | Rocking Horse |
| "Had Enough" | 2020 | Rocking Horse |
| "Lick Me" (with Vera Hotsauce) | 2020 | Non-album single |
| "Could This Be Love" | 2021 | Rocking Horse |
| "Drunk & Angry" | 2021 | Rocking Horse |

==== As featured artist ====
| Title | Year | Certifications | Album |
|---|---|---|---|
| "In My Head" (Tilly featuring Elliphant) | 2013 | | Non-album singles |
| "Siri" (Yogi featuring Elliphant and Pusha T) | 2015 | | Non-album singles |
| "Stardust" (WDL featuring Elliphant) | 2015 | | No Wings Airline |
| "Blame" (Zeds Dead and Diplo featuring Elliphant) | 2016 | | Northern Lights |
| "Lazers from My Heart" (Birdy Nam Nam featuring Elliphant) | 2016 | | Dance or Die |
| "Stranger" (Peking Duk featuring Elliphant) | 2016 | ARIA: 5× Platinum | Non-album single |
| "Stockholm White" (UZ & Two Fresh featuring Elliphant) | 2017 | | Layers |
| "Good Day" (Yellow Claw featuring DJ Snake and Elliphant) | 2017 | | Los Amsterdam |
| "Visa" (Bantu featuring Elliphant and Soaky Siren) | 2017 | | Non-album single |
| "Jungle" (Loreen featuring Elliphant) | 2017 | | Nude |
| "HZE" (Mouthe featuring Elliphant and WDL) | 2018 | | Non-album singles |
| "Bitches" (Tove Lo featuring Charli XCX, Icona Pop, Elliphant and Alma) | 2018 | | Non-album singles |
| "Revelations" (Adil Omar featuring Elliphant, SNKM and Shaman Durek) | 2018 | | Transcendence |
| "Clicks" (Deniz Koyu featuring Elliphant) | 2022 | | Non-album single |
| "Pachamama" (Luude featuring Elliphant) | 2024 | | Non-album single |

==== Promotional singles ====
| Title | Year | Album |
|---|---|---|
| "Too Original" (Major Lazer featuring Elliphant and Jovi Rockwell) | 2015 | Peace Is the Mission |
| "Time Machine" | 2020 | Rocking Horse |
| "White Tiger" | 2020 | Rocking Horse |
| "Notorious" | 2021 | Rocking Horse |

=== Guest appearances ===
| Title | Year | Other artist(s) | Album |
|---|---|---|---|
| "Rat in the Snow" | 2013 | Adam Tensta | The Undeniable Tape |
| "No Money No Love" | 2014 | David Guetta, Showtek, Ms. Dynamite | Listen |
| "TTU (Too Turnt Up)" (Valentino Khan Remix) | 2015 | Flosstradamus, Waka Flocka Flame | Plurnt: The Remixes |

=== Music videos ===
| Title | Year | Director(s) |
|---|---|---|
| "Ciant Hear It" | 2012 | Unknown |
| "Down on Life" | 2012 | Tim Erem |
| "Live Till I Die" | 2013 | MOFO |
| "Music Is Life" (featuring Ras Fraser Jr.) | 2013 | Sebastian Reed |
| "Could It Be" | 2013 | Air & Space |
| "Where Is My Mama At" | 2013 | Nikeisha Andersson and Loella Billner |
| "Revolusion" | 2014 | StyleWar |
| "Only Getting Younger" (featuring Skrillex) | 2014 | Jordan Bahat |
| "One More" (featuring MØ) | 2014 | Tim Erem |
| "Purple Light" (featuring Doja Cat) | 2015 | Ellis Bahl |
| "Love Me Badder" | 2015 | Skinny |
| "Club Now Skunk" (featuring Big Freedia) | 2015 | Johan Holm |
| "North Star (Bloody Christmas)" | 2015 | Alexander Federic and Onegirlband |
| "Step Down" | 2016 | Liza Minou Morberg |
| "Spoon Me" (featuring Skrillex) | 2016 | Aisha Linnea and Shahbaz Shigri |
| "Where Is Home" (featuring Twin Shadow) | 2016 | Aisha Linnea |
| "Bitches" (Tove Lo featuring Charli XCX, Icona Pop, Elliphant and Alma) | 2018 | Lucia Aniello |
| "Revelations" (Adil Omar featuring Elliphant, SNKM and Shaman Durek) | 2018 | Adil Omar |
