= SNKM =

Pakistani musicians

- Origin: Islamabad, Pakistan
- Genres: Hip hop, pop, industrial, psychedelic, alternative
- Years active: 2015 - 2019
- Members: Adil Omar; Talal Qureshi

SNKM (an abbreviation for Saturday Night Killing Machine and Sonic Nocturnal Kinetic Movement) was a duo of Pakistani musicians Adil Omar and Talal Qureshi, with both artists sharing production, songwriting and vocal duties.

SNKM launched in 2015 as Saturday Night Killing Machine and made their official US debut at SXSW the same year. In 2016, they joined the lineup for Diplo's Mad Decent Block Party. SNKM has also shared stages with artists such as Major Lazer, Skrillex, Elliphant, Rae Sremmurd, Kesha, Marshmello, Valentino Khan, Big Freedia and many others.

== Discography ==
=== EPs ===
- 2015: Saturday Night Killing Machine

=== Singles ===
- 2015: Nighat & Paras
- 2017: Motors
- 2017: Atomic Kitten
- 2017: What Have We Done
- 2018: Revelations (Adil Omar featuring Elliphant, SNKM & Shaman Durek)
