= Lahore Music Meet =

Lahore Music Meet (LMM) is an annual two-day event in Lahore, Pakistan, dedicated to celebration and critique of the Music of Pakistan. LMM is a gathering of music enthusiasts, artists, people from the music industry and academics involved in music. The conference was founded by Natasha Noorani, Zahra Paracha, Noor Habib, Ayesha Haroon and Hasan Abbas.

== Lahore Music Meet 2015 ==
LMM 2015, started on Saturday 4 April at the Al Hamra Arts Council in Lahore. The two-day event included a panel discussions and storytelling sessions on various types and aspects of music with prominent names in the music business, and workshops for aspiring musicians to interact with music educators.

Panel discussion topics included classical music in the modern age, music videos, metal music, narratives of resistance in music, and women in music, and workshops included sitar and tabla, music education, and storytelling sessions with Faris Shafi, Ali Gul Pir, Hamid Ali Khan, Suraiya Multanikar, Rohail Hayat and Shahida Mini.

LMM 2015 featured performances by Pakistani singers and artists such as Asrar, Jimmy Khan, Sachal Orchestra and Ustad Naseeruddin Saami.

== Lahore Music Meet 2016 ==
LMM 2016 was held on 2-3 April 2016. Mainstage performances at the event included Attaullah Khan Esakhelvi, Mai Dhai, Sounds Of Kolachi and Red Blood Cat.

The event featured panel discussions, workshops and storytelling sessions conducted by Tina Sani, Meekal Hassan of Meekal Hasan Band, Ali Noor and Ali Hamza of Noori, Sikandar Mufti, Ahsan Bari, Mushtaq Soofi, Adnan Malik, Zoe Viccaji, Zohaib Kazi and Haroon.

The first day saw performances by Mooroo, Shamoon Ismail, Umer Naru and Bayaan, and concluded with performances by Mai Dhai and the Red Blood Cat.

The second day featured, among others, a panel discussion on traditional Folk Music in Pakistan, and appearances from Ali Zafar, film maker Aisha Linnea Akthar, Aarad Junejo, Saqib Malik, Shahbaz Shigri, and Naseer Afridi, ending with a performance by folk singer Attaullah Khan Esakhelvi.
